= List of the prehistoric life of Utah =

This list of the prehistoric life of Utah contains the various prehistoric life-forms whose fossilized remains have been reported from within the US state of Utah.

== Precambrian ==
The Paleobiology Database records no known occurrences of Precambrian fossils in Utah.

== Paleozoic ==
=== Selected Paleozoic taxa of Utah ===
- †Acodus
- †Agnostus
- †Amphiscapha
- †Amplexus
- †Annularia
  - †Annularia stellata
- †Anomalocaris
- †Anomphalus
- †Archimedes
  - †Archimedes macfarlani
- †Arcuolimbus
- †Arenicolites
- †Artisia
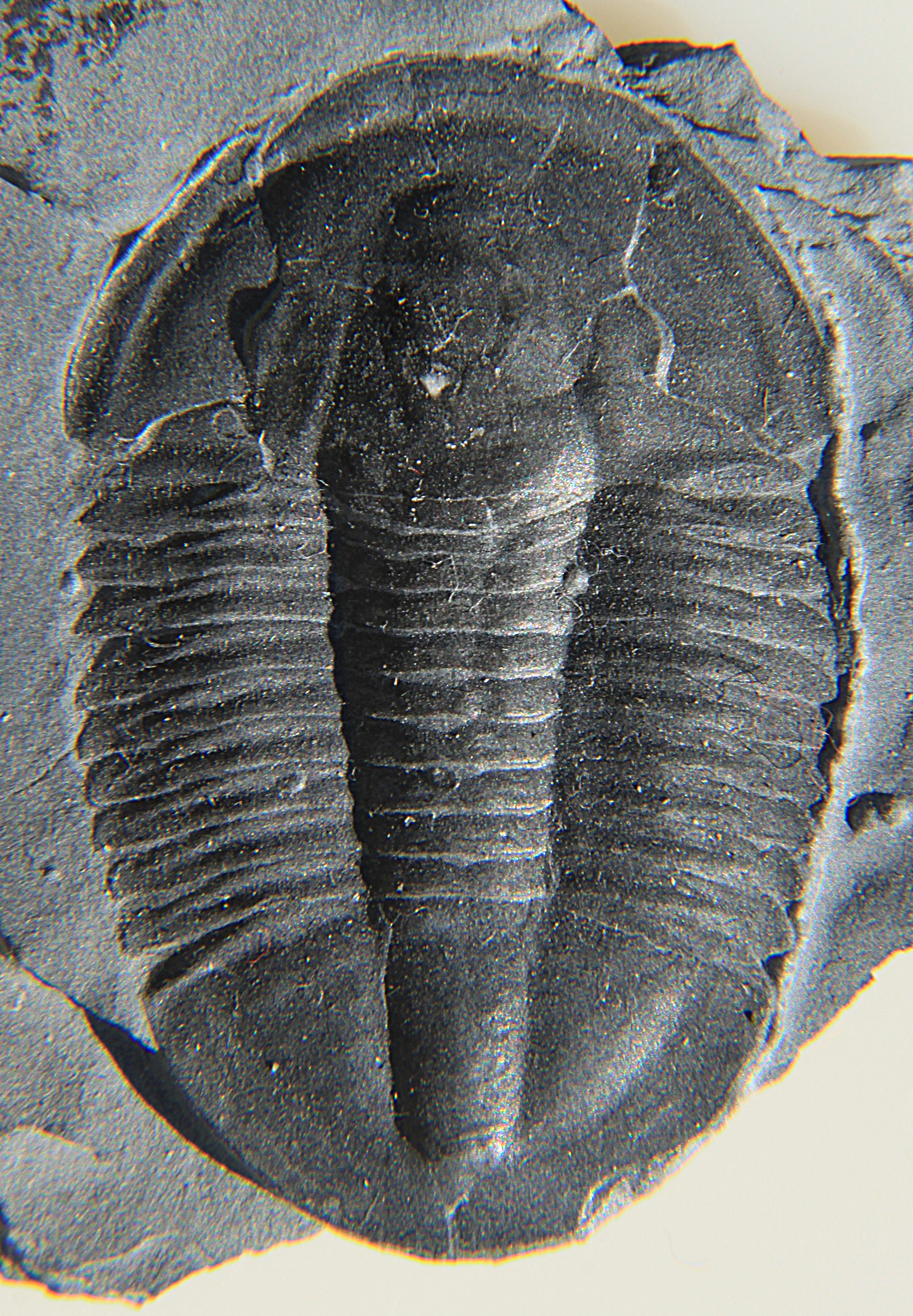
- Fossil of the Cambrian trilobite Asaphiscus
  †Asaphiscus
  - †Asaphiscus wheeleri
- †Athyris
  - †Athyris lamellosa
- †Atrypa
  - †Atrypa parva – or unidentified comparable form
- †Atrypid
- †Aulopora – tentative report
- †Aviculopecten
  - †Aviculopecten girtyi
  - †Aviculopecten kaibabensis – or unidentified comparable form
- †Aysheaia
- †Bathyuriscus
- †Beckwithia
- †Benthamaspis
- †Beyrichoceras
- †Biscoia
- †Bolbocephalus
- †Bonneterrina
- †Bourbonnella
- †Bowmania
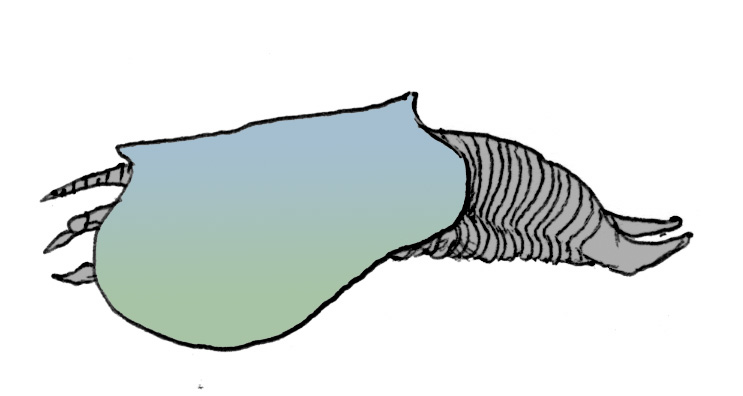
- Life restoration of the mysterious Cambrian animal Branchiocaris
  †Branchiocaris
- †Brassicicephalus
- †Calamites
  - †Calamites cistii – or unidentified comparable form
  - †Calamites suckowii
- †Callipteris – tentative report
- †Callocladia
- †Camarotoechia
- †Campbelloceras – tentative report
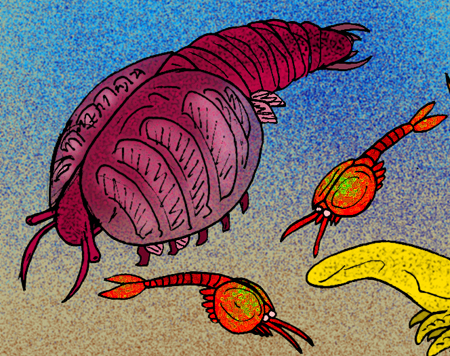
- Life restoration of the Cambrian arthropod Canadaspis (left)
  †Canadaspis
  - †Canadaspis perfecta – or unidentified comparable form
- †Canadia
- †Caninia
- †Cardiopteris
- †Carolinites
- †Cavusgnathus
- †Cedaria
- †Chancelloria
- †Chancia
- †Choia
- †Chondrites
- †Chonetes
- †Cladochonus
- †Cleiothyridina
- †Clonograptus
- †Coenites
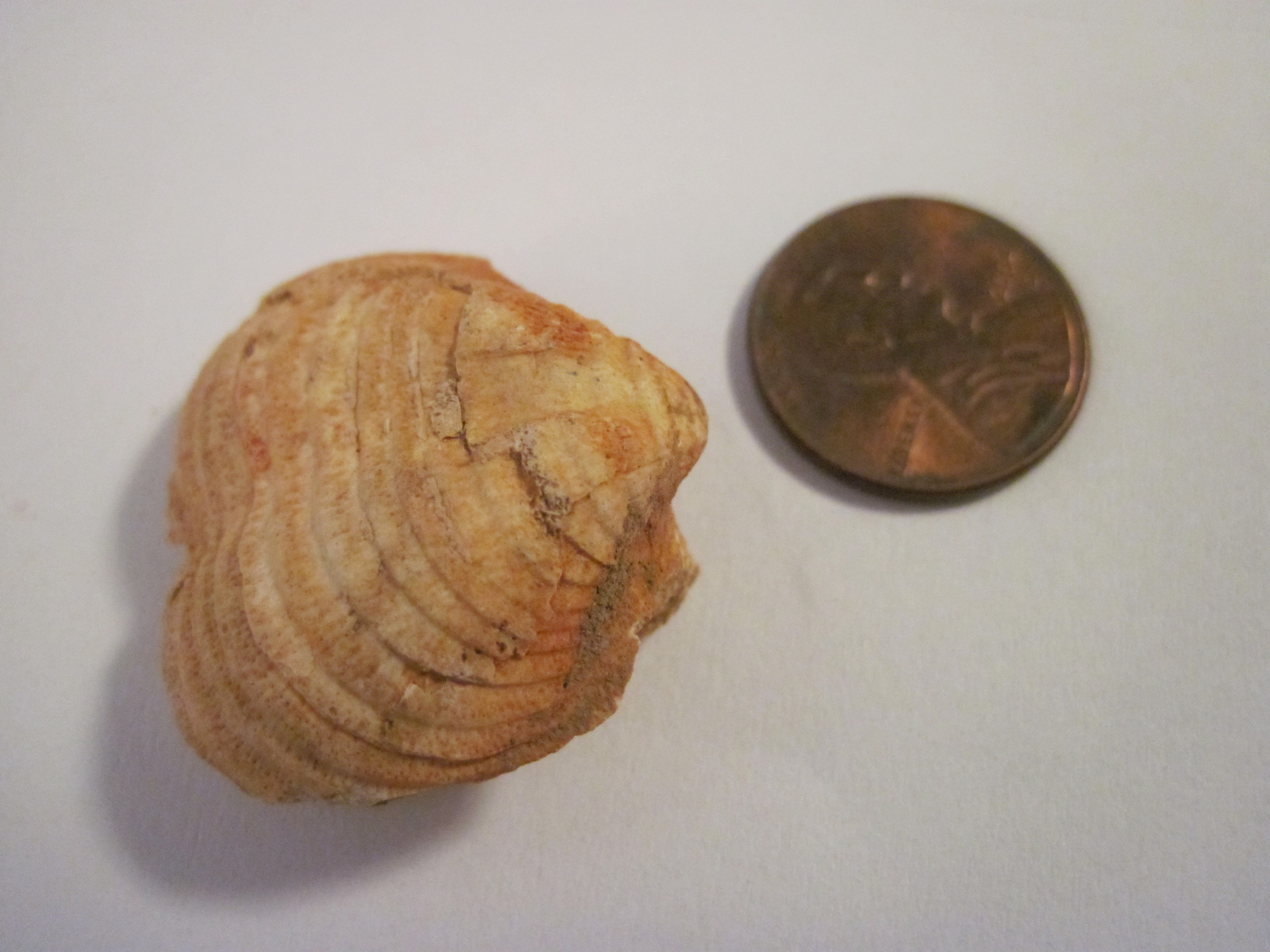
- Fossilized shell of the Late Devonian-Permian brachiopod Composita
  †Composita
  - †Composita mira
  - †Composita ovata
  - †Composita parasulcata
  - †Composita plana
  - †Composita subtilita
  - †Composita trinuclea
- †Coosella
- †Coosina
- †Cordaicarpus
- †Cordaites
  - †Cordaites principalis
- Crania
- †Cravenoceras
- †Crepicephalus
- †Cruziana
- †Ctenospondylus
- †Cybelopsis
- †Cyclopteris
- †Cystodictya
- †Deiracephalus
- Dentalium
- †Diadectes
- †Diagoniella
- †Dictyonema
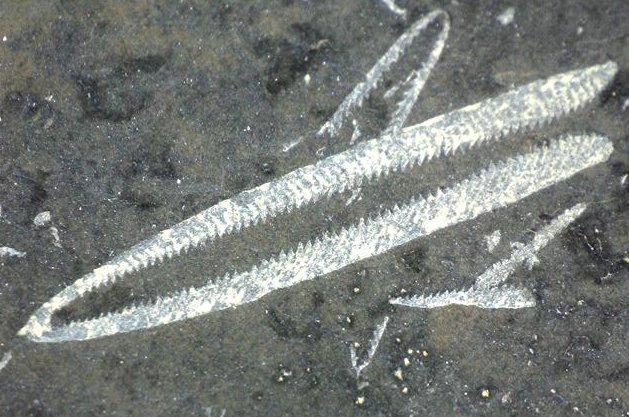
- Fossil of the Middle Ordovician graptolite Didymograptus
  †Didymograptus
  - †Didymograptus nitidus – or unidentified comparable form
- †Dimeropygiella
- †Diplorrhina
- †Donaldina
- †Dresbachia
- †Echinaria
- †Ectosteorhachis – or unidentified related form
- †Ehmaniella
- †Eldonia
- †Eleutherocentrus
- †Elrathia
- †Elrathina
- †Emeraldella
- †Endoceras
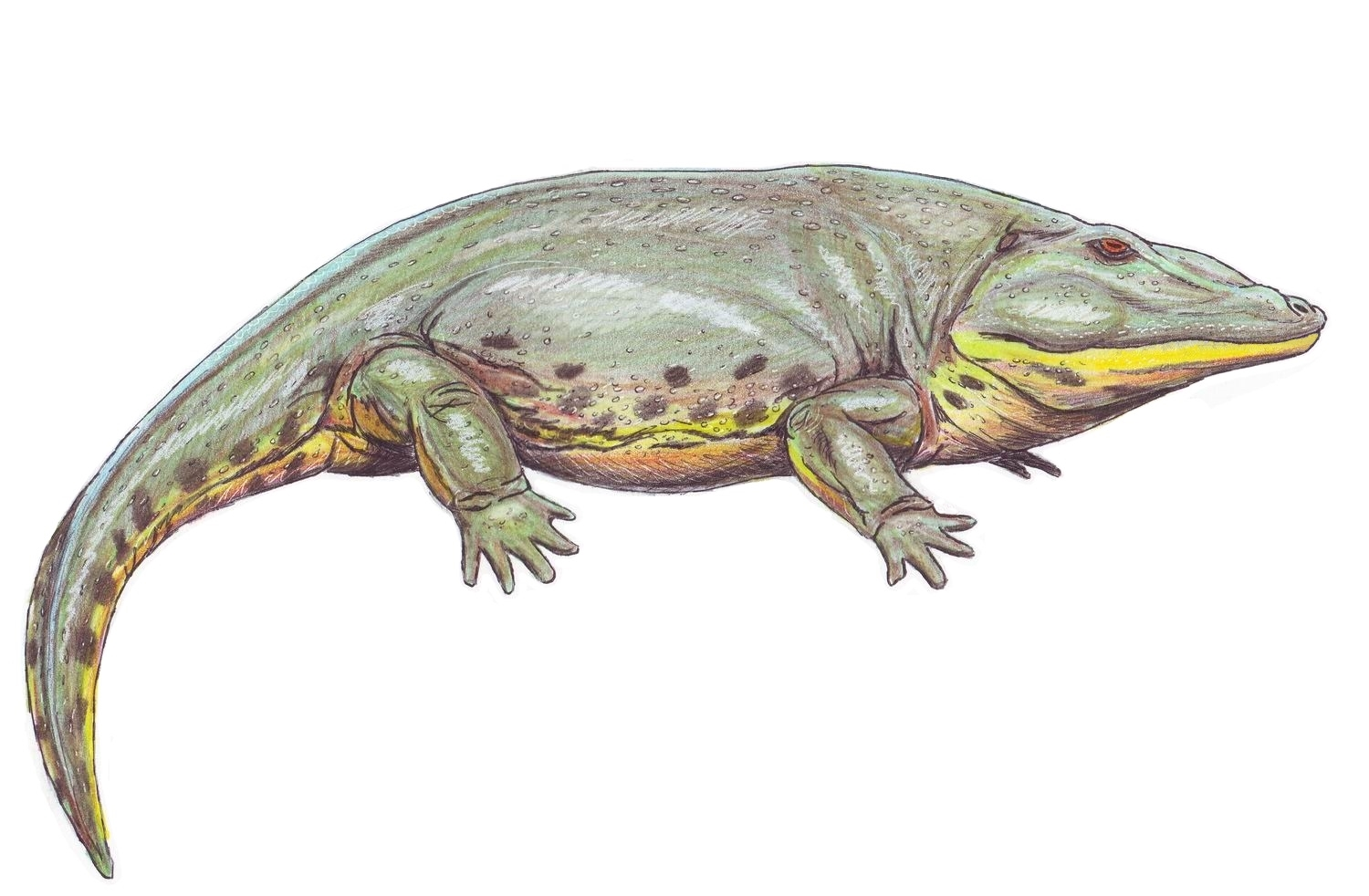
- Life restoration of the Carboniferous-Permian amphibian Eryops
  †Eryops
- †Euptychaspis
- †Fenestella
- †Forteyops
- †Genevievella
- †Girvanella
- †Gnathodus
- †Gogia
- †Goniatites
- †Gunterichthys – type locality for genus
- †Hamptonia
- †Haplophrentis
- †Hazelia
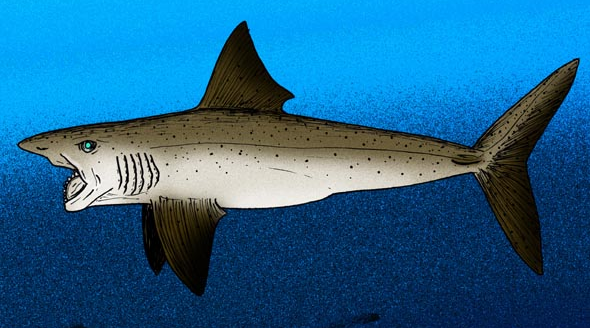
- Life restoration of the Permian Chimaera relative Helicoprion
  †Helicoprion
- †Hematites
- †Hemirhodon
- †Hindia
- †Hintzeia
- †Homagnostus
- †Huronia
- †Hyolithellus
- †Hyolithes
- †Idiognathodus
- †Illaenus
- †Irvingella
- †Jeffersonia
- †Kanoshia
- †Kawina
- †Kingstonia
- †Kirkella
- †Komia
- †Kootenia
- †Lachnostoma
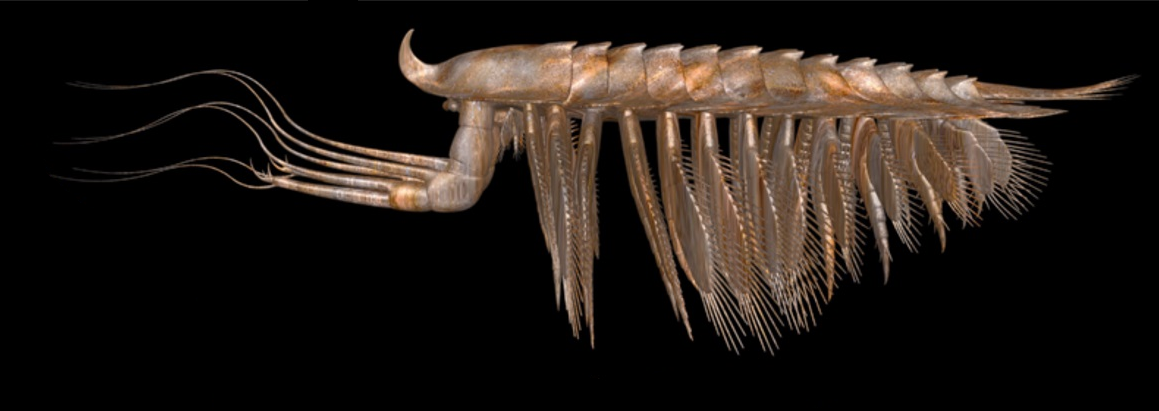
- Life restoration in multiple views of the Cambrian arthropod Leanchoilia
  †Leanchoilia
- †Lejopyge
- †Lepidodendron
  - †Lepidodendron aculeatum
  - †Lepidodendron obovatum
- †Lepidophyllum
- †Lepidostrobus
- †Leptomitus
- Lima
- Limatula
- Lingula
- †Lingulella
- †Llanoaspis
- †Lochriea
- †Lonchocephalus
- †Lyracystis
- †Margaretia
  - †Margaretia dorus
- †Marpolia
- †Matthevia
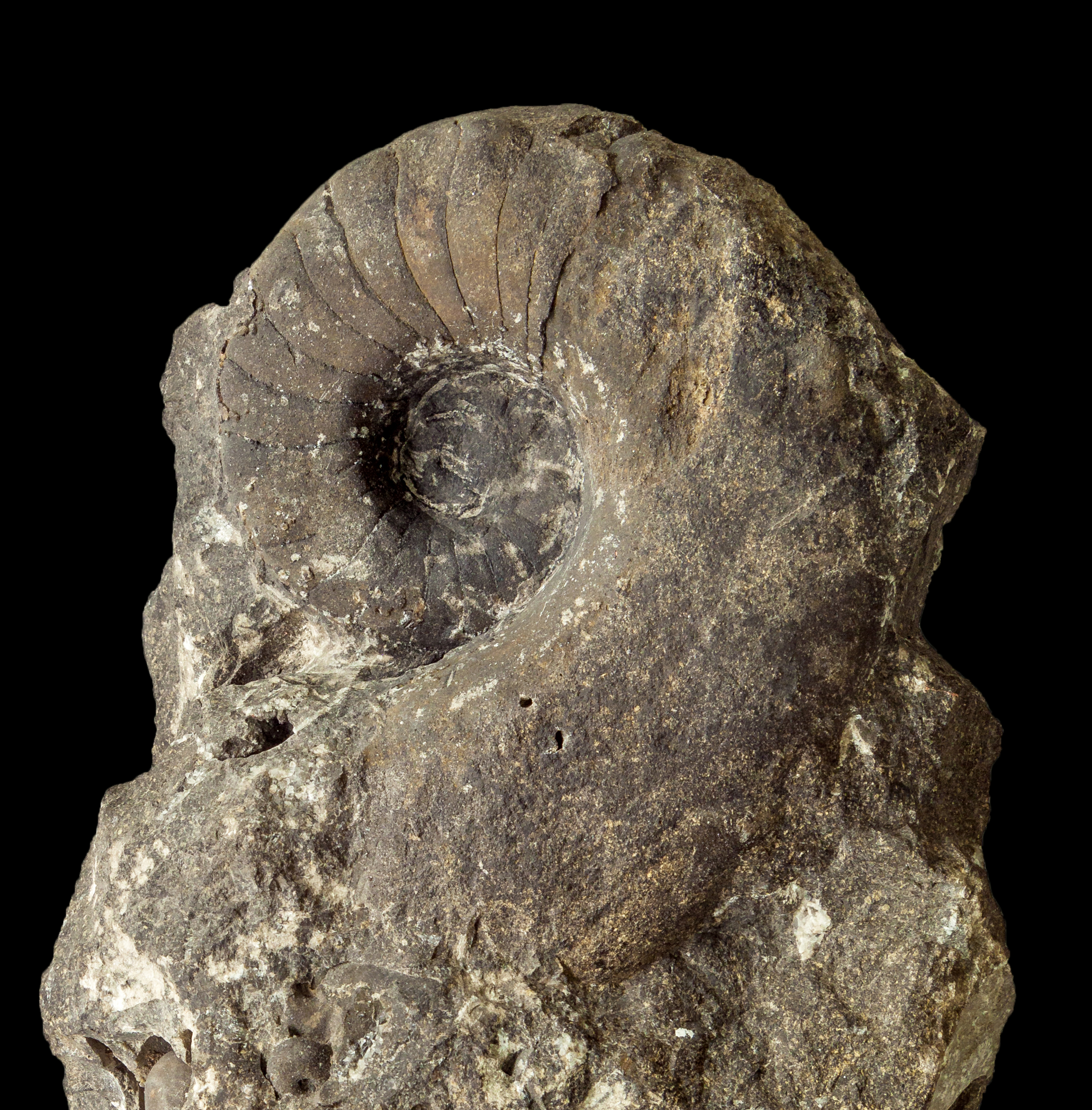
- Fossilized shell of the Carboniferous-Permian nautiloid cephalopod Metacoceras
  †Metacoceras
- †Meteoraspis
- †Micromitra
- Modiolus – report made of unidentified related form or using admittedly obsolete nomenclature
- †Mollisonia
- †Morania
- †Naraoia
- †Naticopsis
- †Neospirifer
  - †Neospirifer cameratus
  - †Neospirifer kansasensis
  - †Neospirifer triplicatus
- †Neuropteris
  - †Neuropteris gigantea
  - †Neuropteris heterophylla
- †Niobe – tentative report
- †Nisusia
- †Norwoodia
- †Obolus
- †Ogygopsis
- †Olenellus
- †Olenoides
  - †Olenoides nevadensis
  - †Olenoides serratus
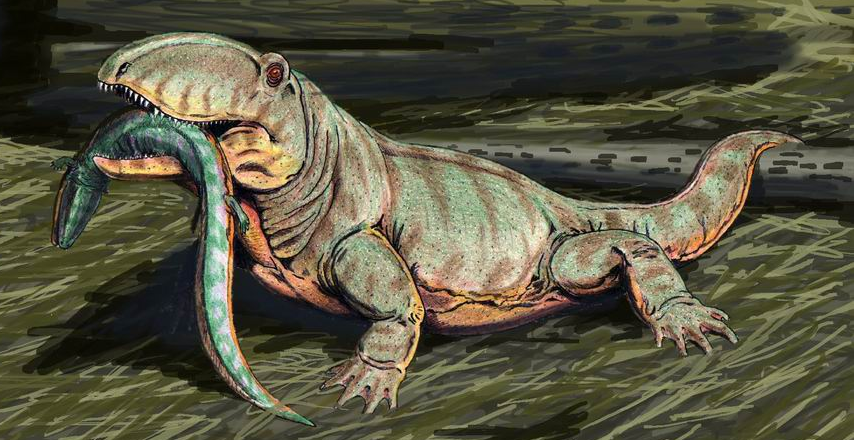
- Life restoration of the Carboniferous-Permian synapsid (mammal precursor) Ophiacodon
  †Ophiacodon
  - †Ophiacodon navajovicus
- †Orthis
- †Oryctocephalus
- †Ottoia
  - †Ottoia prolifica
- †Ozarkodina
- †Pagetia
- †Paladin
- Palaeoaplysina
- †Palaeoscolex
- †Pelagiella
- †Pentamerus
- †Peronopsis
  - †Peronopsis interstricta
- †Perspicaris
- †Phillipsia
- †Phyllograptus
- Pinna – report made of unidentified related form or using admittedly obsolete nomenclature
- †Platycrinites
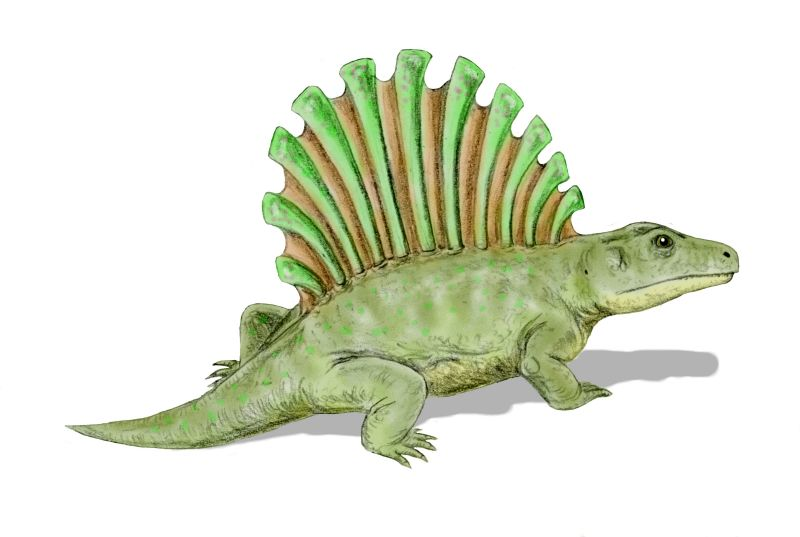
- Life restoration of the Carboniferous-Permian sail-backed amphibian Platyhystrix
  †Platyhystrix – or unidentified comparable form
  - †Platyhystrix rugosus
- †Prodentalium
- †Prohedinia
- †Protopliomerella
- †Protospongia
- †Ptychagnostus
  - †Ptychagnostus atavus
- †Pugnax
- †Punka
- †Quadratia
- †Rayonnoceras
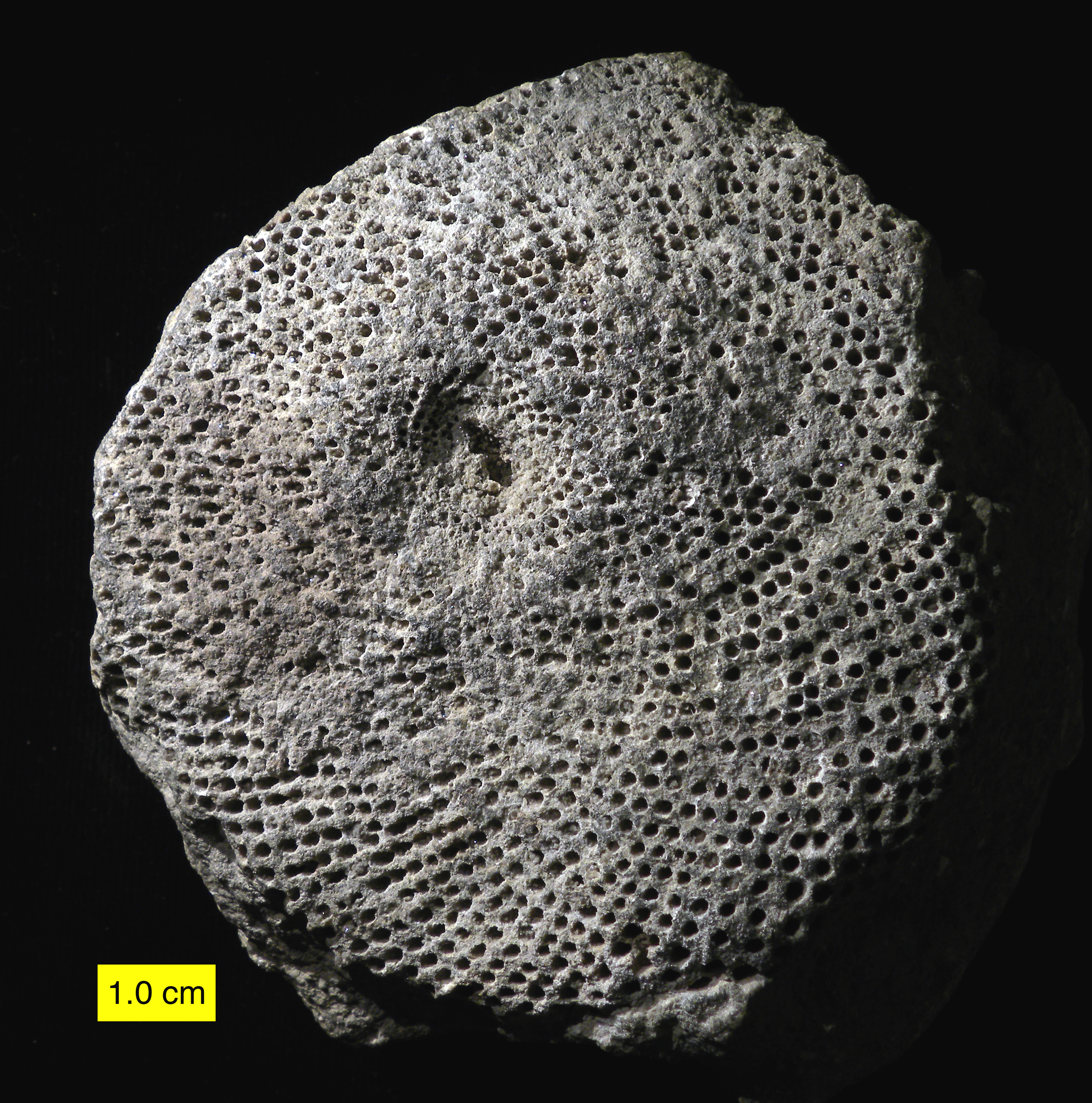
- Fossil of the Early Ordovician-Permian benthic alga Receptaculites
  †Receptaculites
- †Ribeiria
- †Rusophycus
- †Saukiella
- †Scenella
- †Schmalenseeia
- †Schwagerina
- †Scolicia
- †Selkirkia
  - †Selkirkia columbia – or unidentified comparable form
- †Sidneyia
- †Sigillaria
  - †Sigillaria brardii
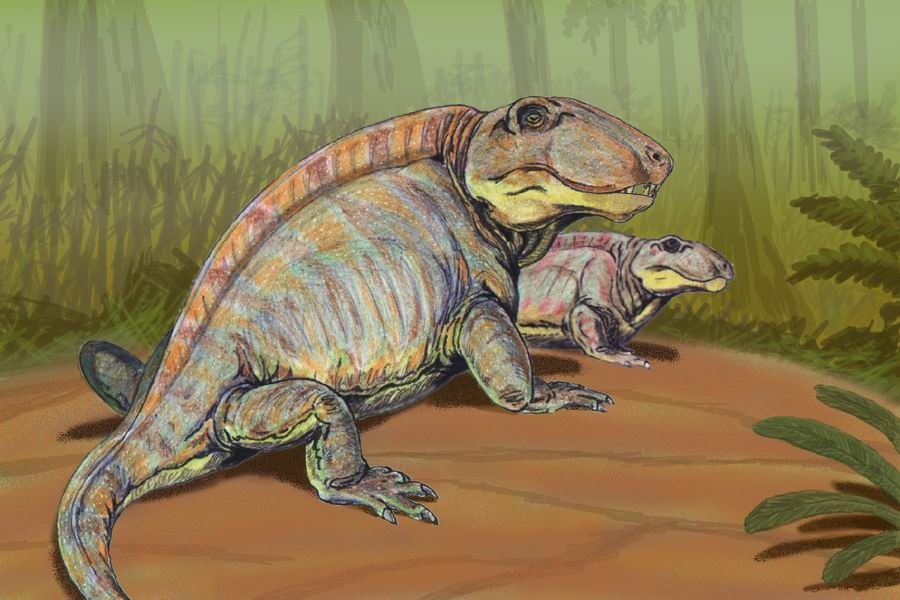
- Life restoration of the Carboniferous-Permian synapsid (mammal precursor) Sphenacodon
  Sphenacodon
- †Sphenophyllum
  - †Sphenophyllum angustifolium
  - †Sphenophyllum verticillatum
- †Sphenopteris
- †Spinofacia – type locality for genus
- †Spirifer
  - †Spirifer centronatus
  - †Spirifer opimus
- †Spiriferina
- Spirorbis
- †Stenorhachis – tentative report
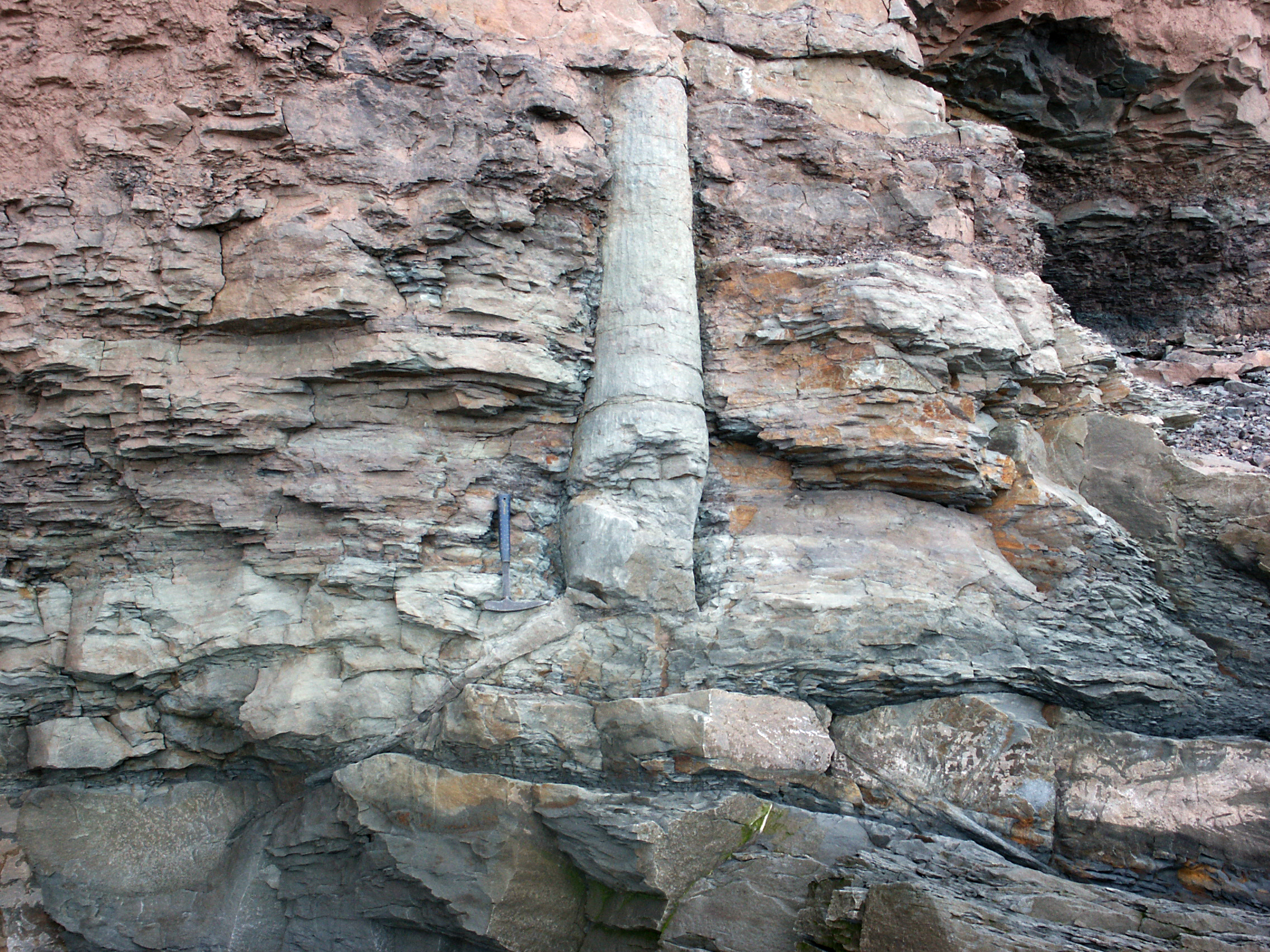
- Fossil preserved in situ of a Carboniferous tree-like club moss relative with attached Stigmaria rhizome system
  †Stigmaria
- †Syringopora
- †Teichichnus – tentative report
- †Terranovella
- †Tetragraptus
- †Thalassinoides – tentative report
- †Tricrepicephalus
- †Trigonocercella
- †Trinodus
- †Triplagnostus
- †Trocholites
- †Tseajaia
  - †Tseajaia campi – type locality for species
- †Tuzoia
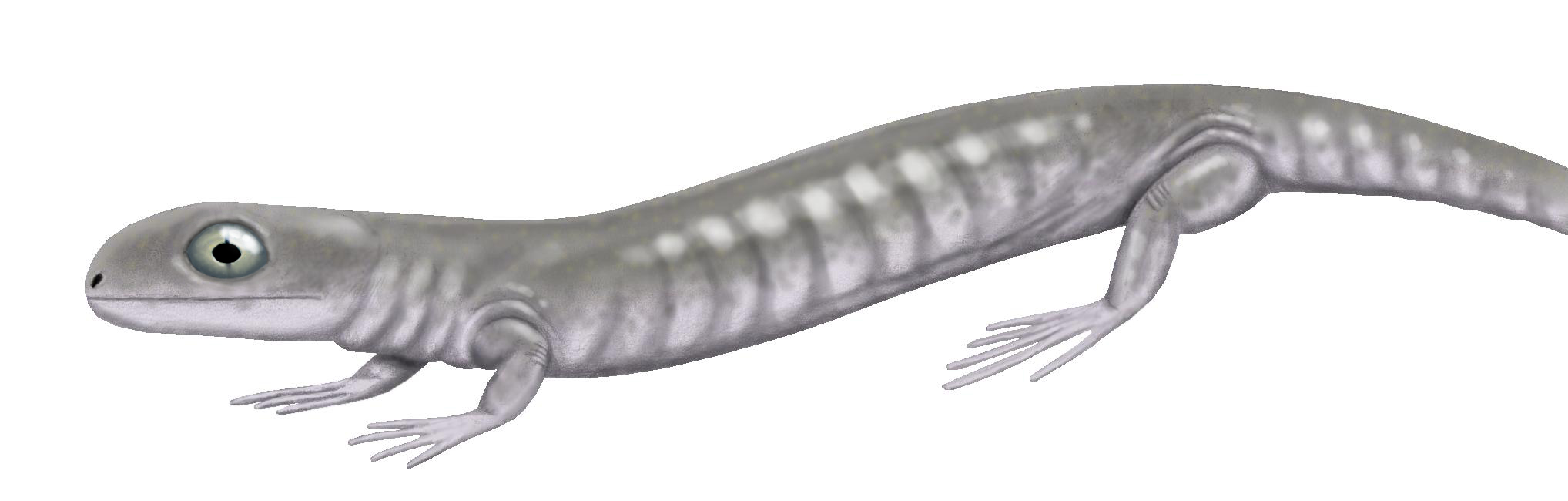
- Life restoration of the Carboniferous amphibian Utaherpeton
  †Utaherpeton – type locality for genus
- †Vauxia
- †Walcottoceras – tentative report
- †Waptia
  - †Waptia fieldensis – or unidentified comparable form
- †Weeksina
- †Wilkingia
- †Wiwaxia
  - †Wiwaxia corrugata
- †Worthenia
- †Xenacanthus – or unidentified related form
- †Yuknessia
- †Zacanthoides
- †Zittelloceras

== Mesozoic ==
=== Selected Mesozoic taxa of Utah ===
- †Abydosaurus – type locality for genus
  - †Abydosaurus mcintoshi – type locality for species
- †Acristavus
  - †Acristavus gagslarsoni
- †Adelolophus – type locality for genus
  - †Adelolophus hutchisoni – type locality for species
- †Adocus
- †Alamosaurus
  - †Alamosaurus sanjuanensis
- †Albanerpeton
  - †Albanerpeton cifellii – type locality for species
  - †Albanerpeton galaktion
  - †Albanerpeton gracilis
  - †Albanerpeton nexuosus
- †Allocrioceras
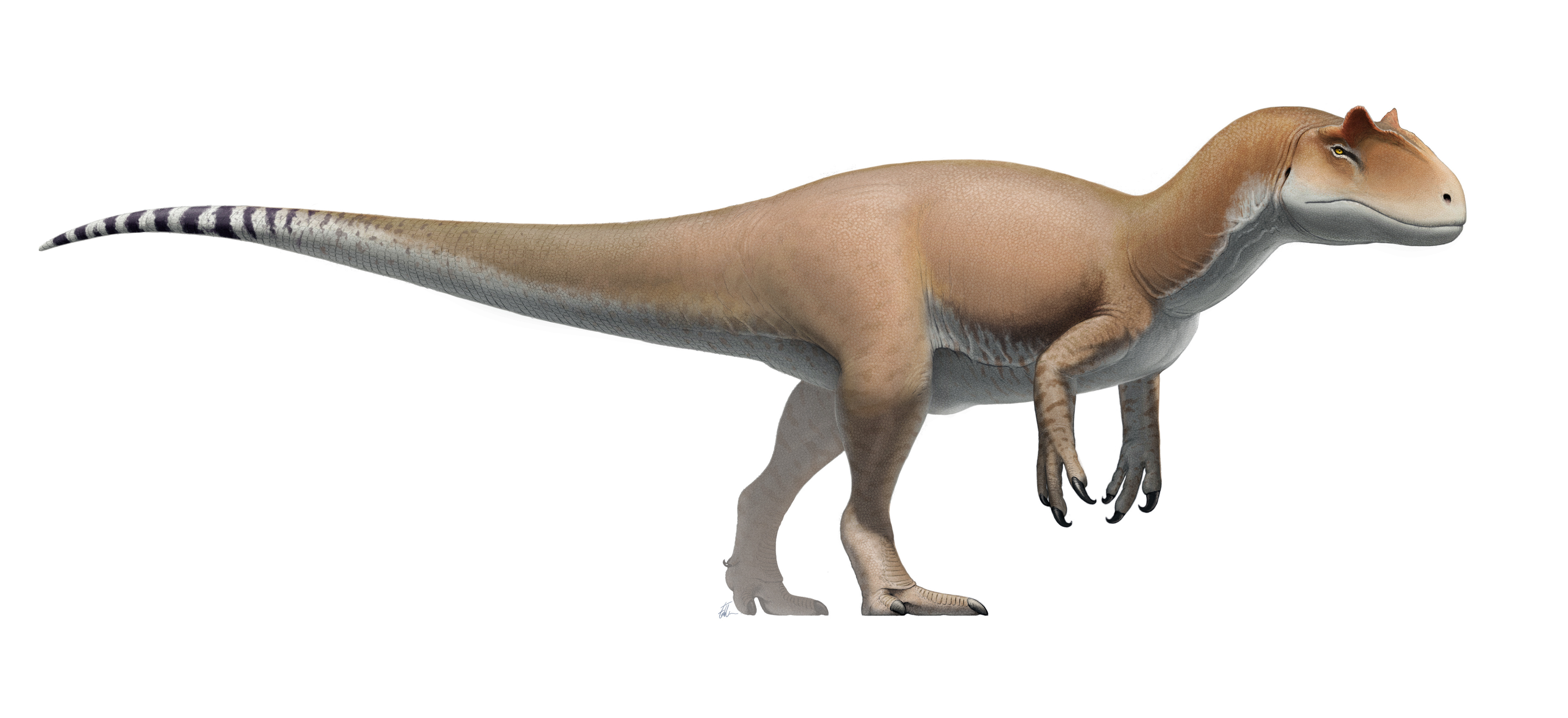
- Life restoration of the Late Jurassic theropod dinosaur Allosaurus
  †Allosaurus
  - †Allosaurus fragilis
- †Alphadon
  - †Alphadon attaragos
  - †Alphadon eatoni – type locality for species
  - †Alphadon halleyi
  - †Alphadon marshi – or unidentified comparable form
  - †Alphadon sahnii
- †Amblotherium
- †Ameribaatar – type locality for genus
  - †Ameribaatar zofiae – type locality for species
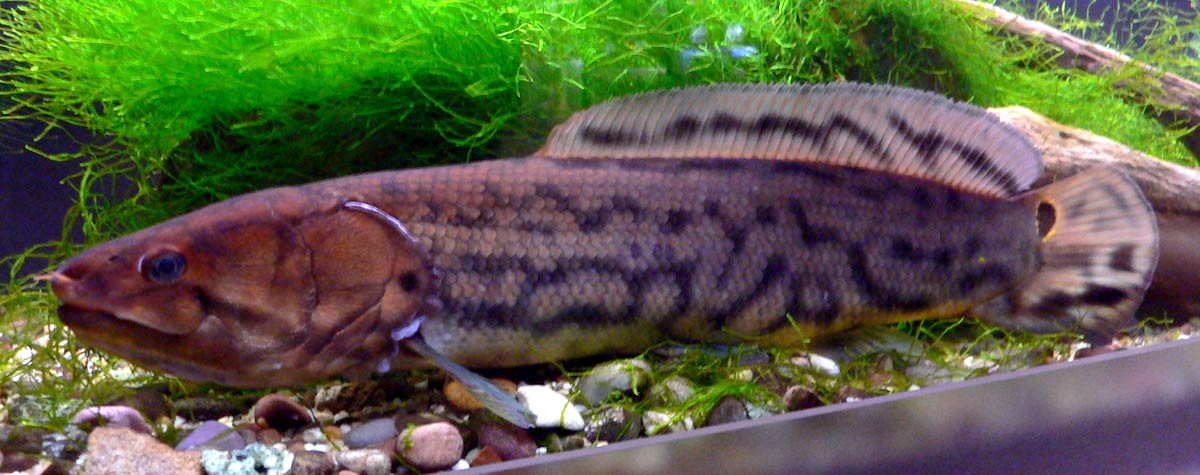
- A living Amia, or bowfin
  Amia
- †Anaflemingites
- †Anasibirites
  - †Anasibirites angulosus
  - †Anasibirites bastini
  - †Anasibirites hircinus
  - †Anasibirites kingianus
  - †Anasibirites mojsisovicsi
  - †Anasibirites multiformis
  - †Anasibirites tenuistriatus
- †Anchisauripus
- †Anemia
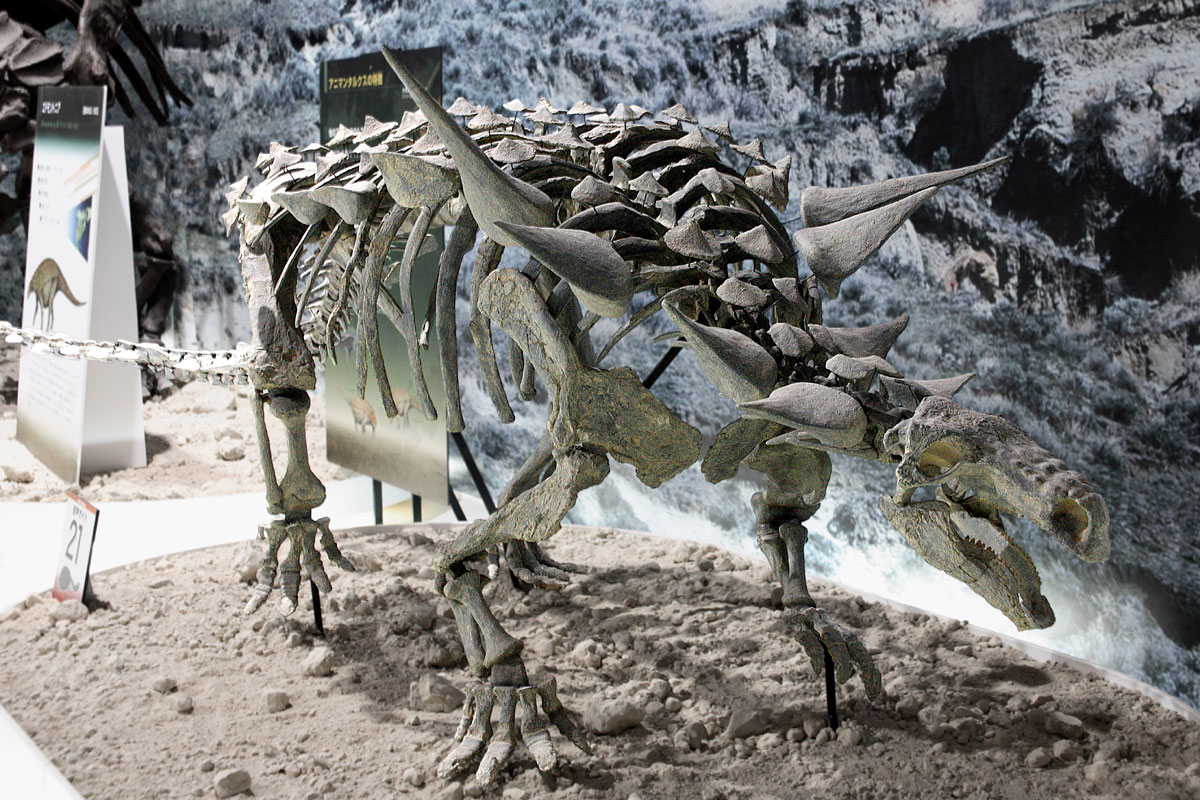
- Mounted fossilized skeleton of the Cretaceous armored dinosaur Animantarx
  †Animantarx – type locality for genus
  - †Animantarx ramaljonesi – type locality for species
- Anomia
- †Anomoepus
- †Apatopus
- †Apatosaurus
  - †Apatosaurus louisae – type locality for species
- †Araeodon
- †Araucarioxylon
- †Arctoceras
- †Arctoprionites
- †Arvinachelys – type locality for genus
- †Aspenites
- Astarte
- Asteriacites
- †Astroconodon
  - †Astroconodon delicatus – type locality for species
- †Atreipus
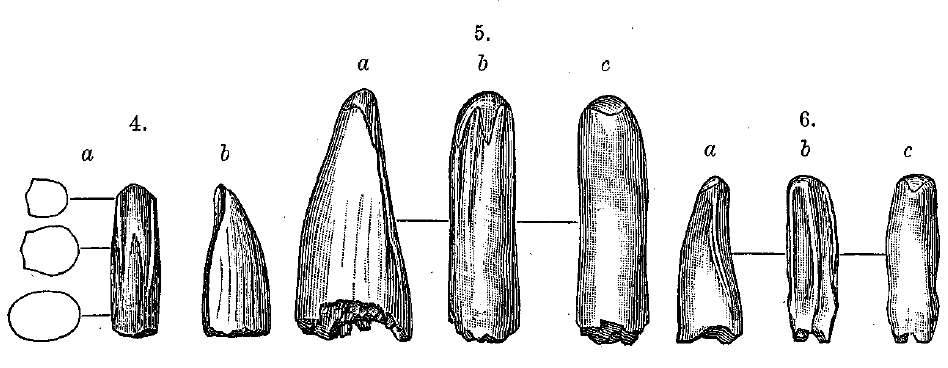
- Illustration of fossilized teeth from the Late Cretaceous tyrannosaur Aublysodon
  †Aublysodon – tentative report
- †Baena
- †Barosaurus
  - †Barosaurus lentus
- †Basilemys
- †Bernissartia
- †Brachauchenius
  - †Brachauchenius lucasi
- †Brachiosaurus
- †Brachyphyllum
- †Brontomerus – type locality for genus
  - †Brontomerus mcintoshi – type locality for species
- †Brontopodus
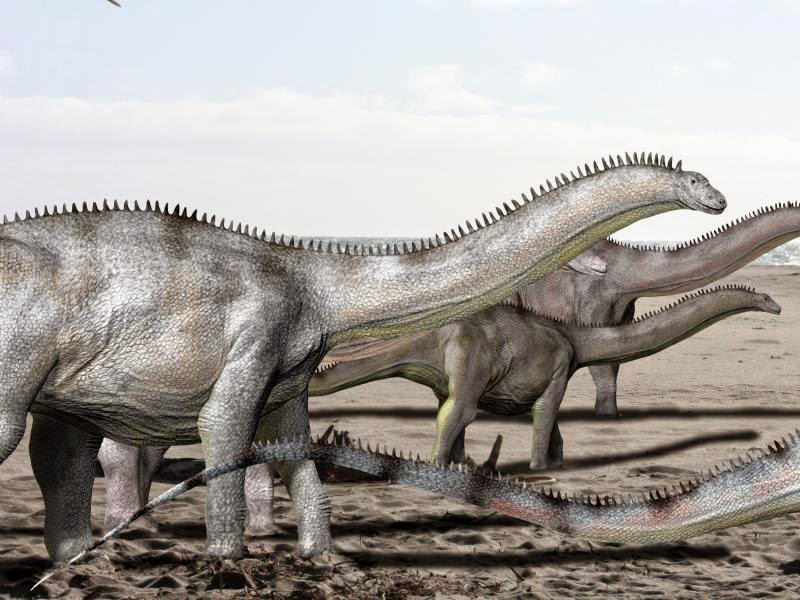
- Life restoration of a herd of the Late Jurassic sauropod dinosaur Brontosaurus
  †Brontosaurus
  - †Brontosaurus parvus
- †Bryceomys
  - †Bryceomys fumosus – type locality for species
  - †Bryceomys hadrosus
  - †Bryceomys intermedius – type locality for species
- †Calycoceras
- †Camarasaurus – type locality for genus
  - †Camarasaurus lentus – type locality for species
- Campeloma
- †Camptosaurus
  - †Camptosaurus dispar
- †Carmelopodus – type locality for genus
- †Cassiope
- †Cedaromys
  - †Cedaromys bestia – type locality for species
  - †Cedaromys parvus – type locality for species
- †Cedarosaurus – type locality for genus
  - †Cedarosaurus weiskopfae – type locality for species
- †Cedarpelta – type locality for genus
  - †Cedarpelta bilbeyhallorum – type locality for species
- †Cedrorestes – type locality for genus
  - †Cedrorestes crichtoni – type locality for species
- †Ceratodus
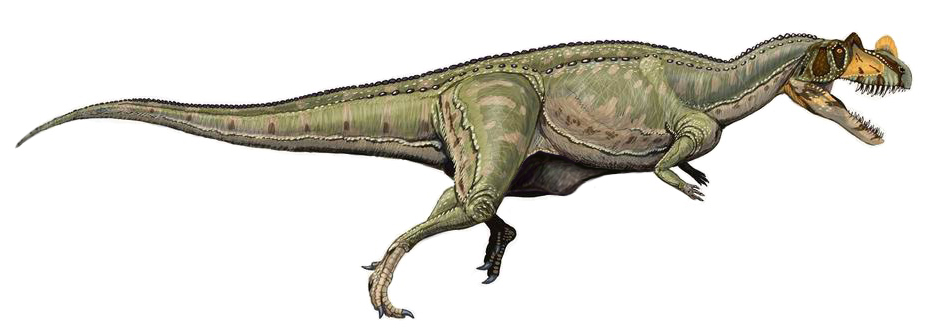
- Restoration of the Late Jurassic ceratosaur Ceratosaurus
  †Ceratosaurus
  - †Ceratosaurus nasicornis
- Cerithiopsis
- †Chamops
- †Chinlea – type locality for genus
- †Chirotherium
  - †Chirotherium rex – or unidentified comparable form
- Chlamys
- †Chondrites
- †Cimexomys
  - †Cimexomys antiquus – or unidentified comparable form
- †Cimolodon
  - †Cimolodon electus
  - †Cimolodon nitidus – or unidentified comparable form
  - †Cimolodon similis
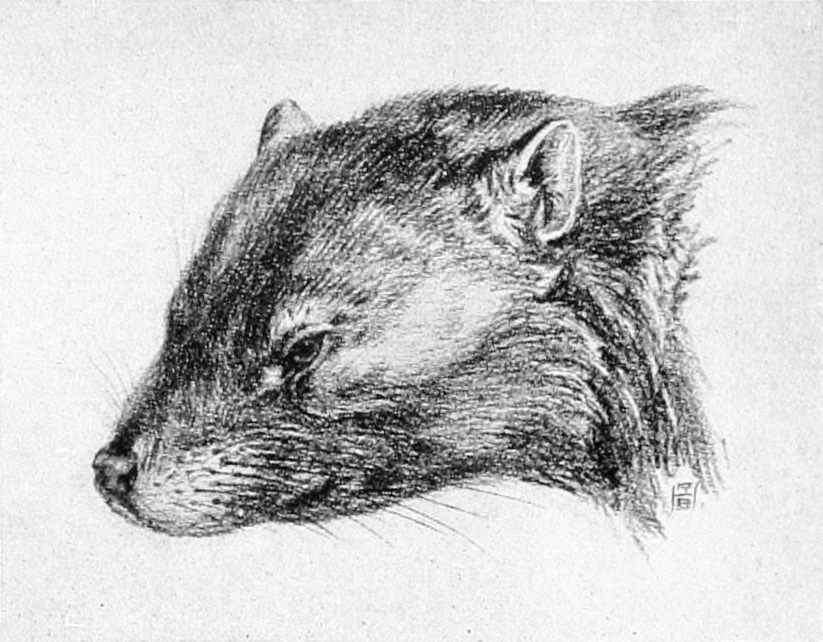
- Life restoration of the face of the Late Cretaceous multituberculate mammal Cimolomys
  †Cimolomys
  - †Cimolomys clarki
  - †Cimolomys milliensis – type locality for species
- Cladophlebis
  - †Cladophlebis constricta
  - †Cladophlebis parva
- †Claraia
- †Coelophysis – tentative report
- †Coelurus
  - †Coelurus fragilis
- †Compsemys
- †Coniophis
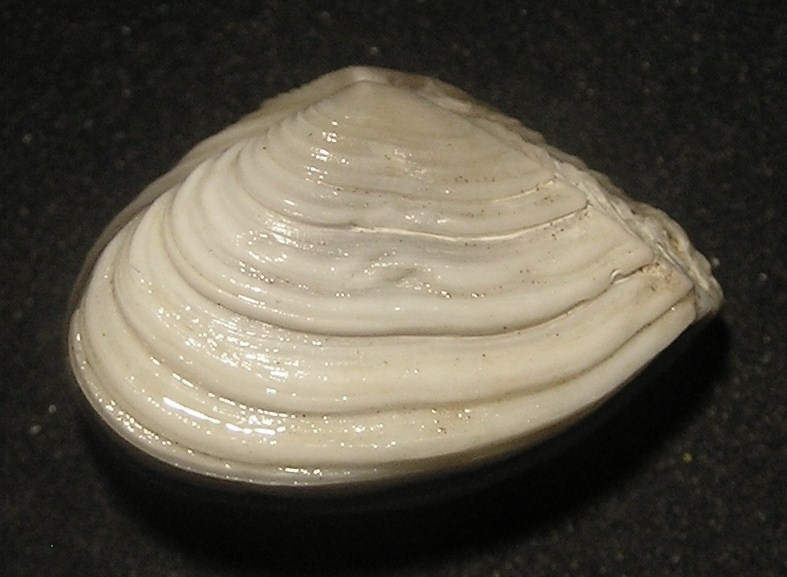
- Shell of a Corbula basket clam
  Corbula
- †Cretorectolobus
- †Ctenacodon
- †Cteniogenys
- Cucullaea
- †Cycadeoidea
- Cylichna
- †Dakotamys
  - †Dakotamys malcolmi – type locality for species
- †Dakotasuchus
  - †Dakotasuchus kingi
- †Deinonychus
- †Denazinemys
  - †Denazinemys nodosa
- Dentalium
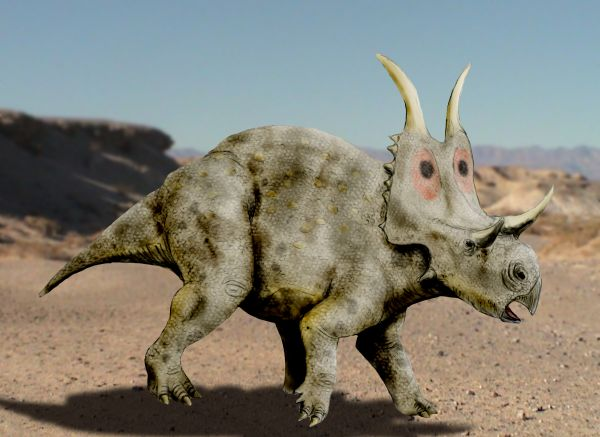
- Restoration of the Late Cretaceous horned dinosaur Diabloceratops
  †Diabloceratops – type locality for genus
  - †Diabloceratops eatoni – type locality for species
- †Dinehichnus – type locality for genus
- †Dinochelys – type locality for genus
- †Diplodocus
  - †Diplodocus hallorum
  - †Diplodocus longus
- Discinisca – report made of unidentified related form or using admittedly obsolete nomenclature
- †Docodon
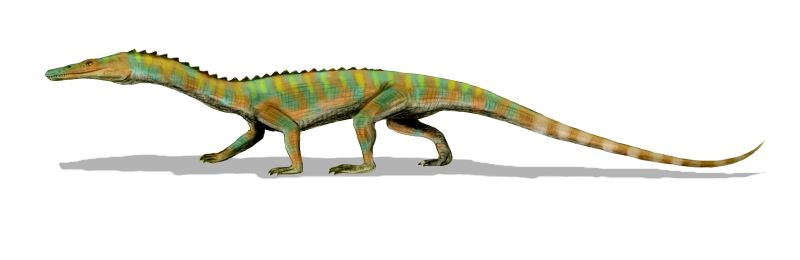
- Restoration of the Late Triassic reptile Doswellia
  †Doswellia
- †Dryolestes
- †Dryosaurus
  - †Dryosaurus altus
- †Dystrophaeus – type locality for genus
  - †Dystrophaeus viaemalae – type locality for species
- Elliptio
- †Enchodus
- †Enneabatrachus
- †Entradasuchus – type locality for genus
  - †Entradasuchus spinosus – type locality for species
- †Eocephalites
- †Eodelphis
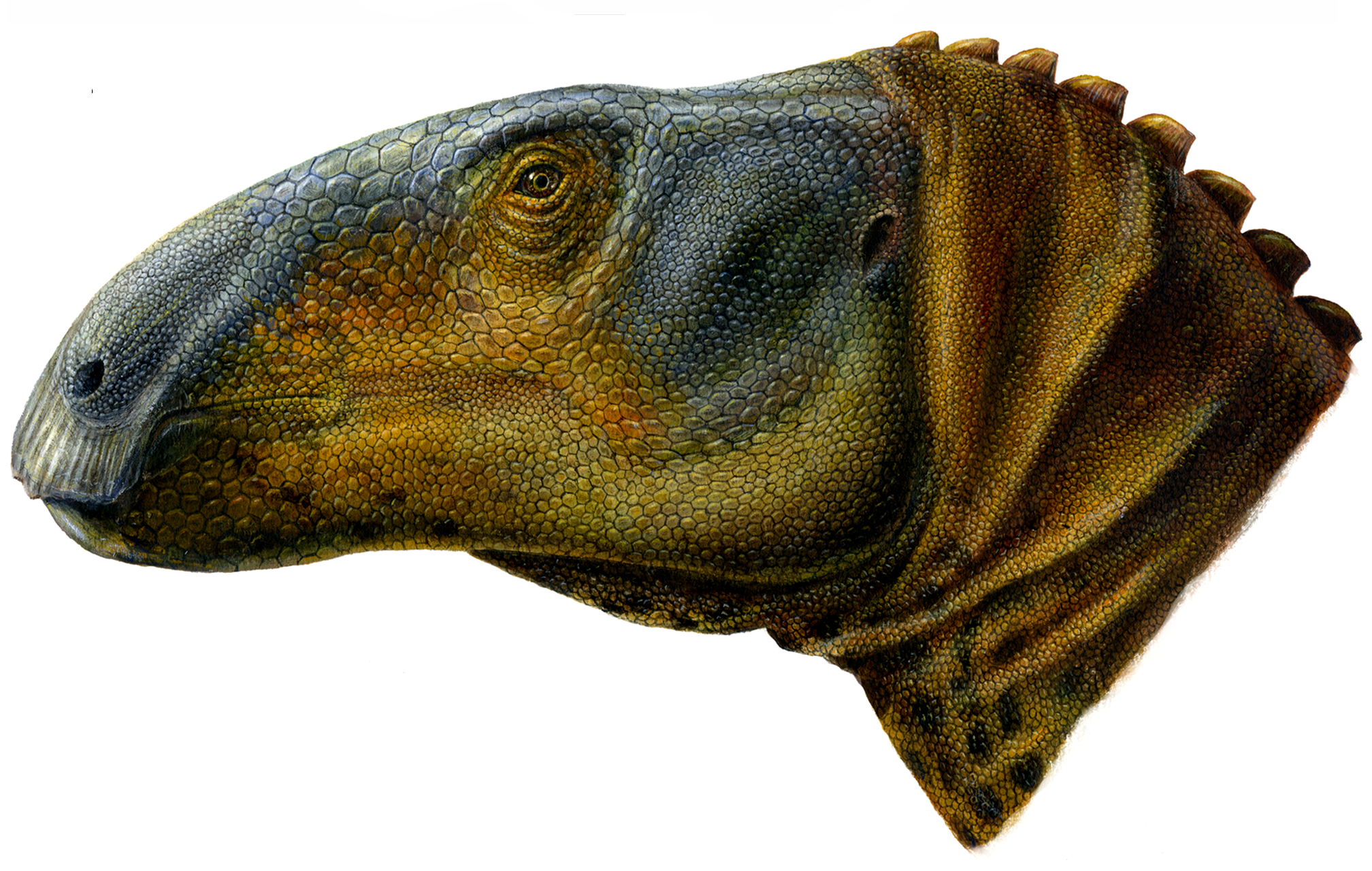
- Illustration of a reconstructed skull and restorative portrait of the Late Cretaceous primitive duck-billed dinosaur Eolambia
  †Eolambia – type locality for genus
  - †Eolambia caroljonesa – type locality for species
- †Eopolycotylus – type locality for genus
  - †Eopolycotylus rankini – type locality for species
- †Equisetum
- †Eryma
- †Eucalyptus
- †Eunaticina
- †Euomphaloceras
- †Euspira
- †Euthlastus
- †Eutretauranosuchus
- †Exogyra
  - †Exogyra acroumbonata
  - †Exogyra levis
- †Fabrosaurus – tentative report
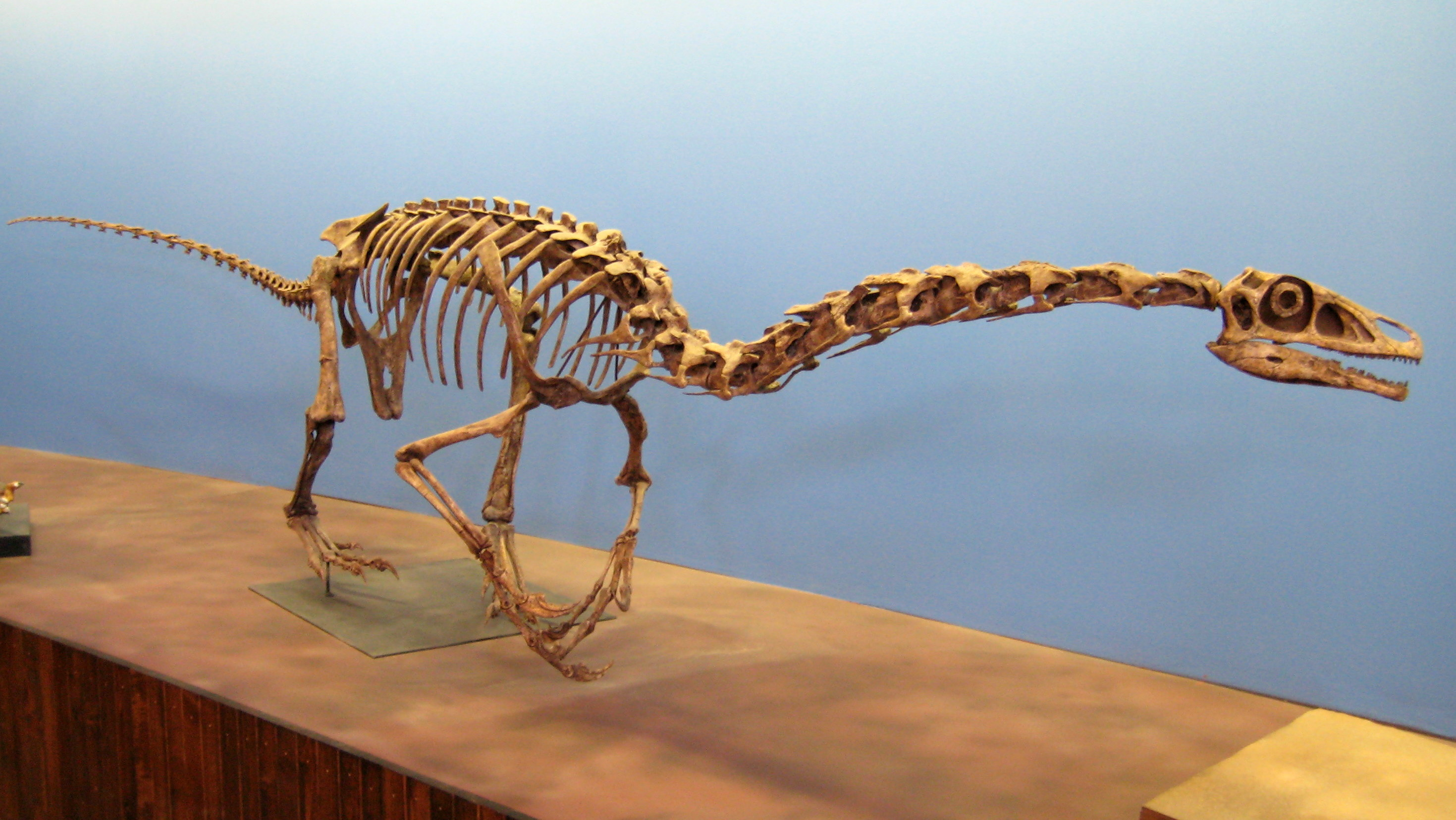
- Fossilized skeleton of the Early Cretaceous therizinossaur Falcarius
  †Falcarius – type locality for genus
  - †Falcarius utahensis – type locality for species
- Ficus
- †Flemingites
- †Gastonia – type locality for genus
  - †Gastonia burgei – type locality for species
- †Geminiraptor
  - †Geminiraptor suarezarum
- †Germanonautilus – tentative report
- †Gervillaria
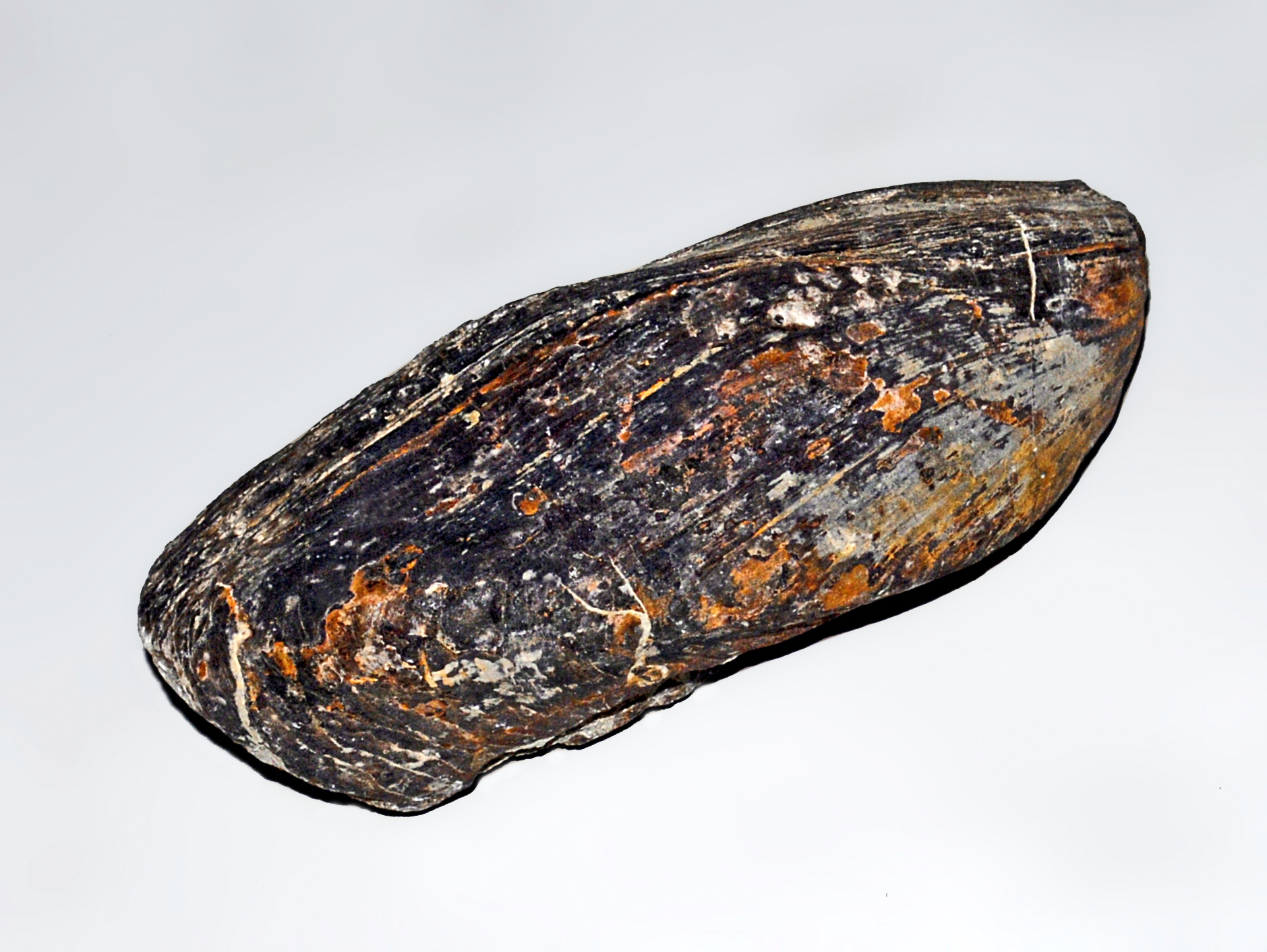
- Fossilized shell of the Carboniferous-Eocene bivalve Gervillia
  †Gervillia
- Gleichenia
- †Glirodon – type locality for genus
  - †Glirodon grandis – type locality for species
- Globularia – tentative report
- †Glyptops
- †Gondolella
  - †Gondolella planata
- †Goniobasis – tentative report
- †Goniopholis
- †Grallator
- †Gryphaea
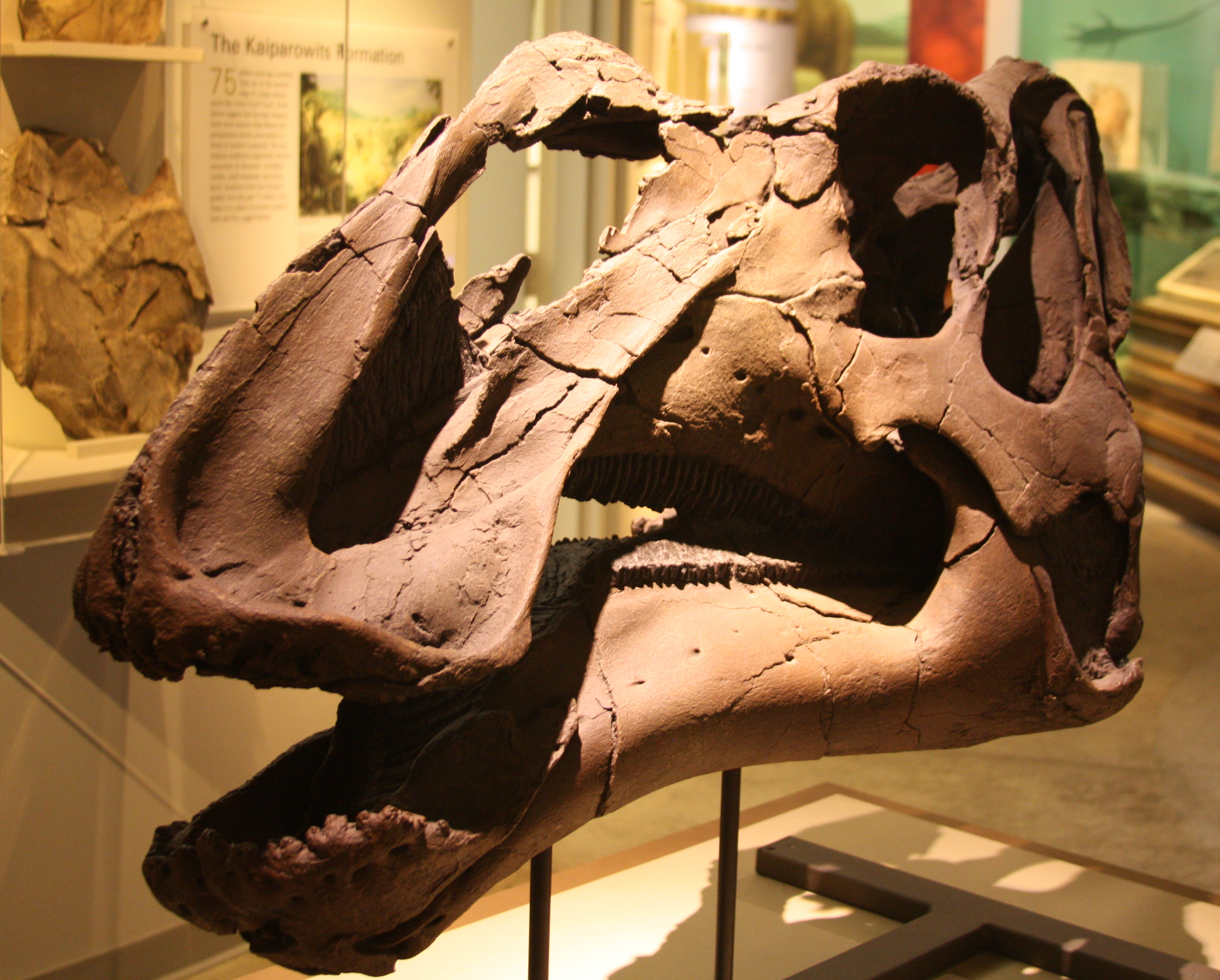
- Mounted fossilized skeleton of the Late Cretaceous duck-billed dinosaur Gryposaurus
  †Gryposaurus
  - †Gryposaurus monumentensis – type locality for species
- †Hagryphus – type locality for genus
  - †Hagryphus giganteus – type locality for species
- †Hamulus – tentative report
- †Hausmania
- †Hedenstroemia
- †Hemicalypterus – type locality for genus
- †Hippodraco – type locality for genus
  - †Hippodraco scutodens – type locality for species
- †Hispanosauropus
- †Homalopoma
- †Hoplitosaurus – or unidentified comparable form
- †Hoplosuchus – type locality for genus
  - †Hoplosuchus kayi – type locality for species
- †Hybodus
- †Iguanacolossus – type locality for genus
  - †Iguanacolossus fortis – type locality for species
- †Iguanodon
  - †Iguanodon ottingeri – type locality for species
- Ilex
  - †Ilex serrata
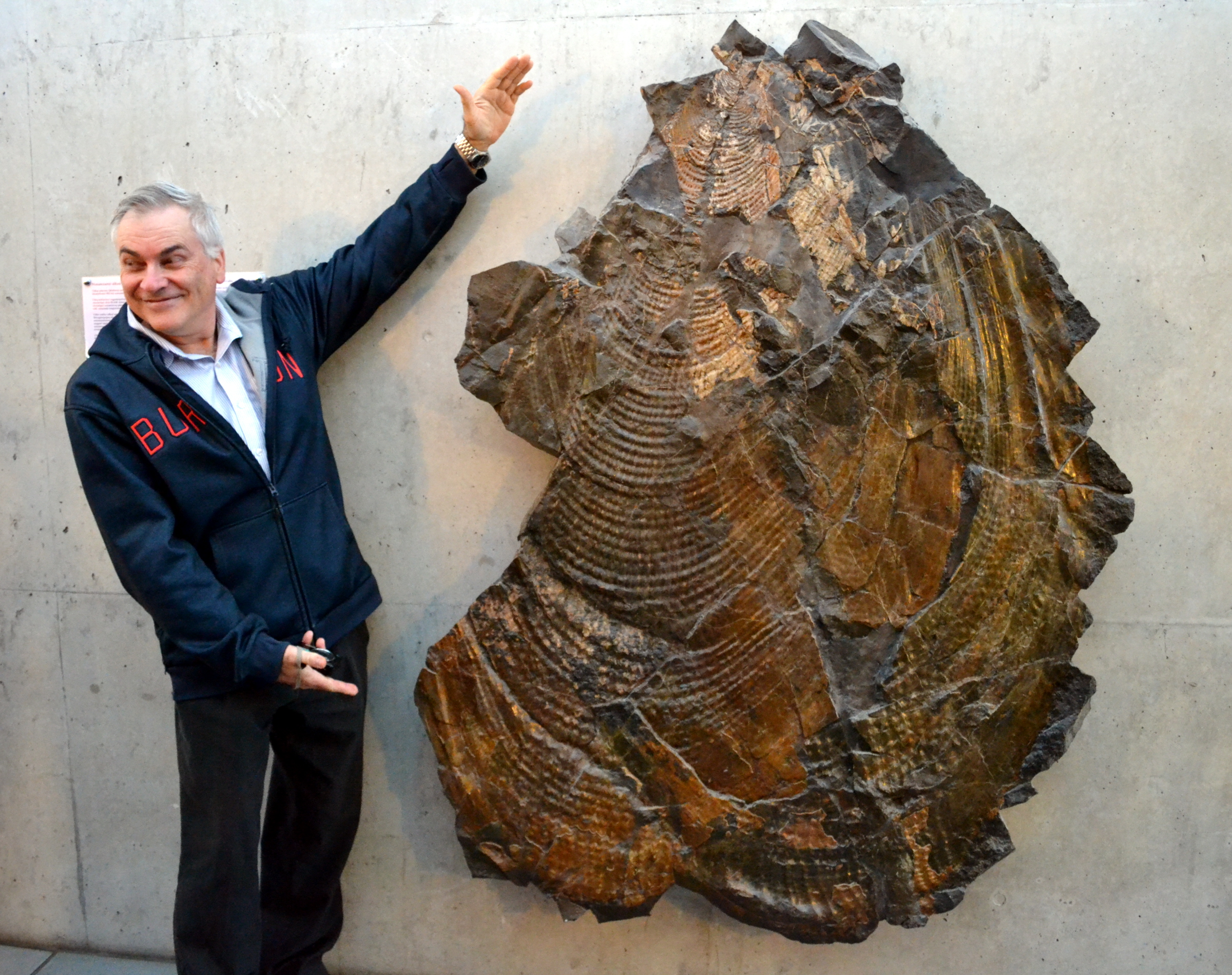
- Fossilized shell of the Early Jurassic-Late Cretaceous marine bivalve Inoceramus with a human indicating its size
  †Inoceramus
  - †Inoceramus albertensis – or unidentified comparable form
  - †Inoceramus flavus
  - †Inoceramus gilberti
  - †Inoceramus koeneni
  - †Inoceramus pictus
  - †Inoceramus tenuistriatus – tentative report
  - †Inoceramus undabundus
- †Inyoites
  - †Inyoites beaverensis – type locality for species
  - †Inyoites oweni
- †Iridotriton – type locality for genus
- †Ischyrhiza – or unidentified comparable form
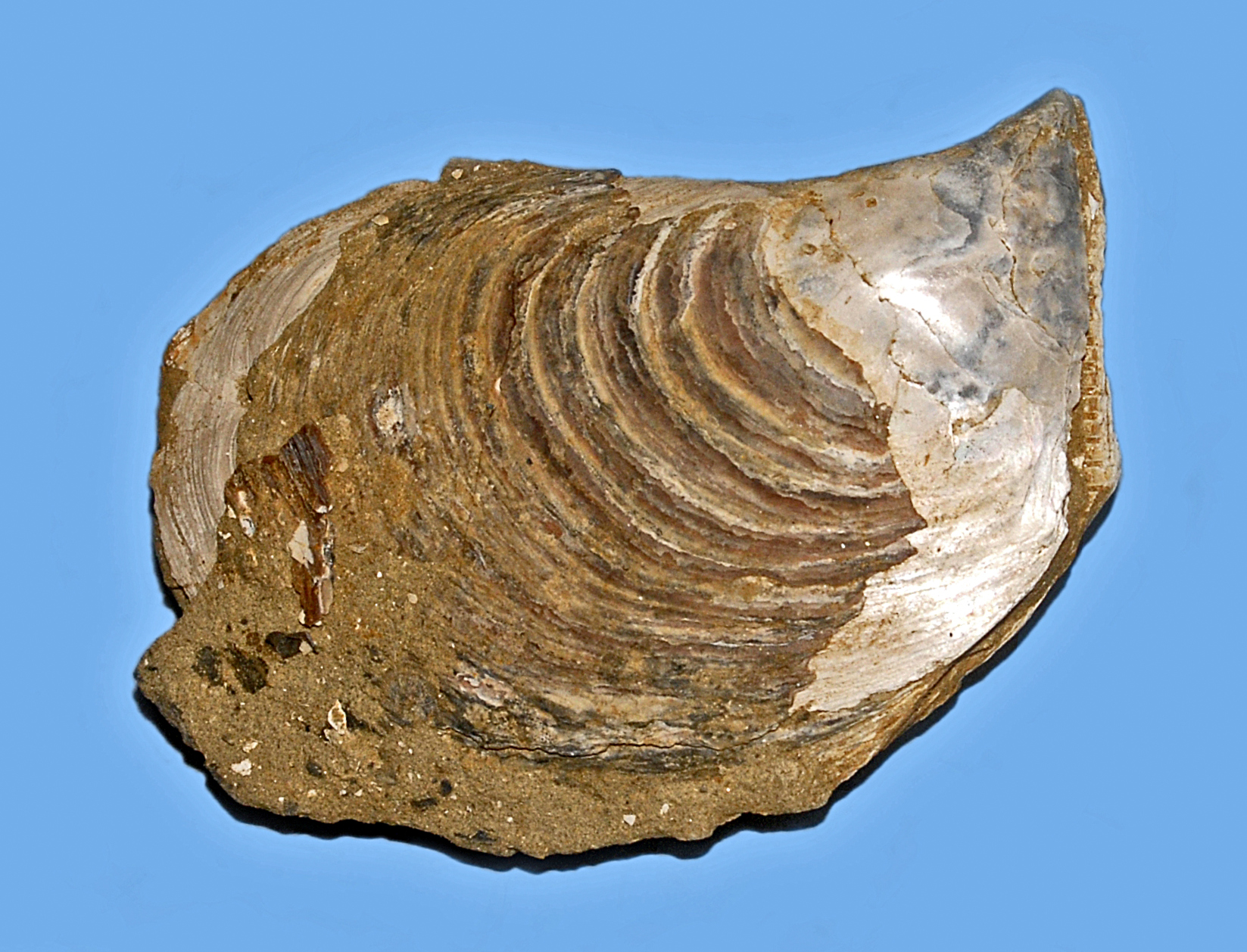
- Fossilized shell of the Permian-modern marine bivalve Isognomon
  Isognomon
- †Janumys – type locality for genus
  - †Janumys erebos – type locality for species
  - †Janumys erebros
- †Jugulator
  - †Jugulator amplissimus
- †Kallirhynchia
- †Kamerunoceras
- †Kayentapus
- †Koparion – type locality for genus
  - †Koparion douglassi – type locality for species
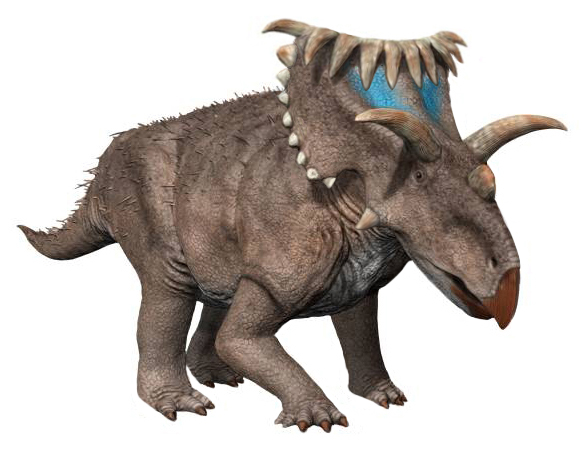
- Life restoration of the Late Cretaceous horned dinosaur Kosmoceratops
  †Kosmoceratops – type locality for genus
  - †Kosmoceratops richardsoni – type locality for species
- †Kouphichnium
- †Leidyosuchus
- †Lepidotes
- Lepisosteus
- †Leptalestes
- Lima
- †Lissodus
- †Lonchidion
- Lopha
- Lucina
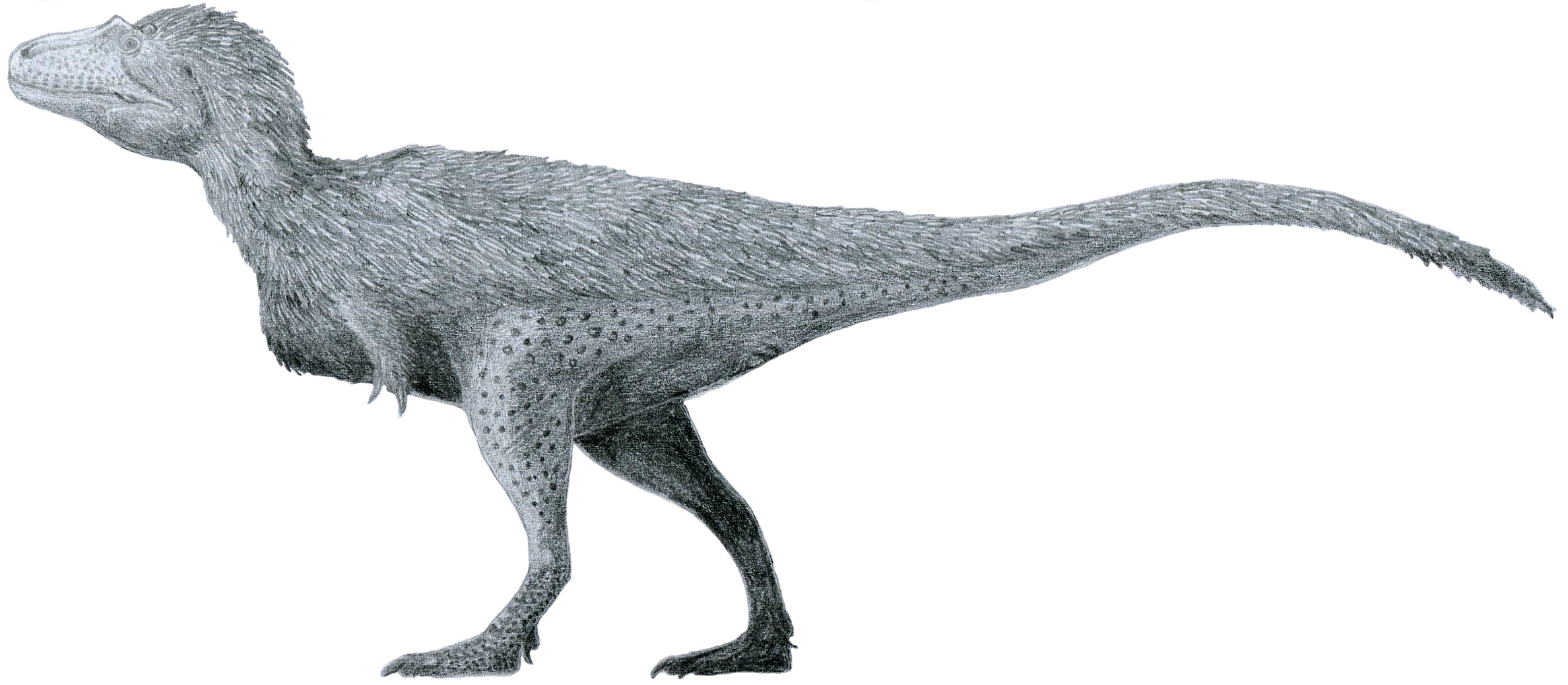
- Life restoration of the Late Cretaceous tyrannosaur Lythronax
  †Lythronax – type locality for genus
  - †Lythronax argestes – type locality for species
- †Machairoceratops – type locality for genus
  - †Machairoceratops cronusi – type locality for species
- †Macroelongatoolithus
- Magnolia
- †Mammites
- †Marshosaurus – type locality for genus
  - †Marshosaurus bicentesimus – type locality for species
- †Martharaptor – type locality for genus
  - †Martharaptor greenriverensis – type locality for species
- †Meekoceras
  - †Meekoceras davisi
  - †Meekoceras gracilitatis
  - †Meekoceras millardense – type locality for species
  - †Meekoceras olivieri – type locality for species
- †Megalosauripus
- †Megasphaeroceras
- †Melvius
  - †Melvius chauliodous – or unidentified comparable form
- †Meniscoessus
  - †Meniscoessus intermedius
- †Mesodma
  - †Mesodma formosa – or unidentified comparable form
  - †Mesodma hensleighi – or unidentified comparable form
  - †Mesodma minor – or unidentified comparable form
  - †Mesodma thompsoni – or unidentified comparable form
- †Metoicoceras
  - †Metoicoceras geslinianum
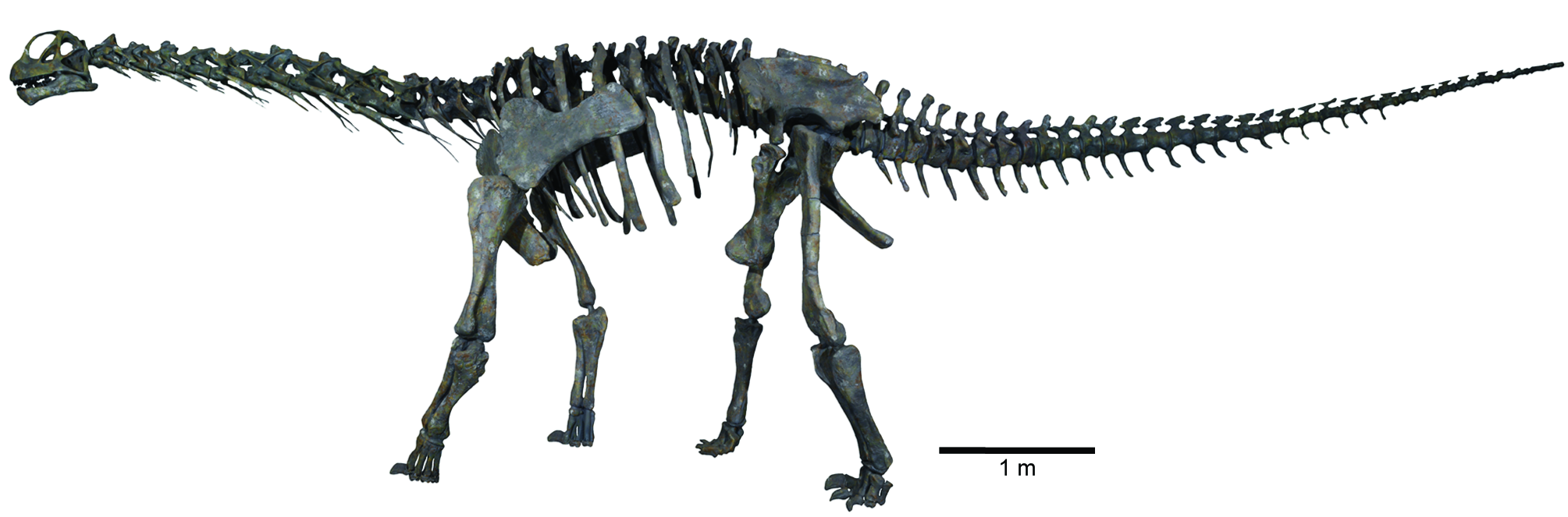
- Mounted fossilized skeletons of the Early Cretaceous long-necked dinosaur Moabosaurus
  †Moabosaurus – type locality for genus
- Modiolus
- †Monanthesia
- †Myledaphus
  - †Myledaphus bipartitus
- †Myophorella
  - †Myophorella livinigstonensis
  - †Myophorella monatanaensis
  - †Myophorella yellowstonensis
- †Myophoria
- †Mytilus
- †Naomichelys
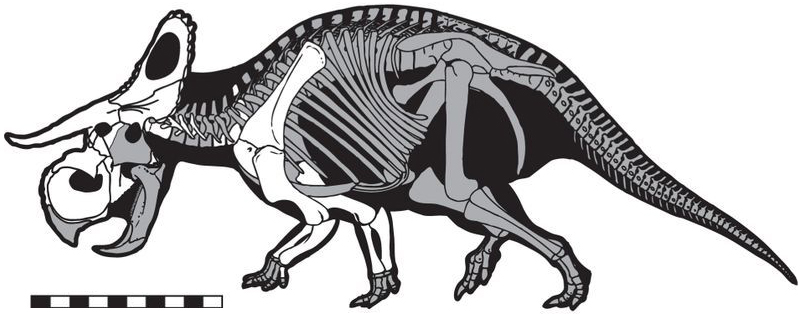
- Known material diagram of the Late Cretaceous horned dinosaur Nasutoceratops
  †Nasutoceratops – type locality for genus
  - †Nasutoceratops titusi – type locality for species
- †Naticopsis
  - †Naticopsis depressispira
  - †Naticopsis fenestravella – type locality for species
  - †Naticopsis utahensis – type locality for species
- †Nedcolbertia – type locality for genus
- †Neocardioceras
  - †Neocardioceras juddii
- †Nerinea – tentative report
- Neritina
- †Nezpercius
- †Normannites – tentative report
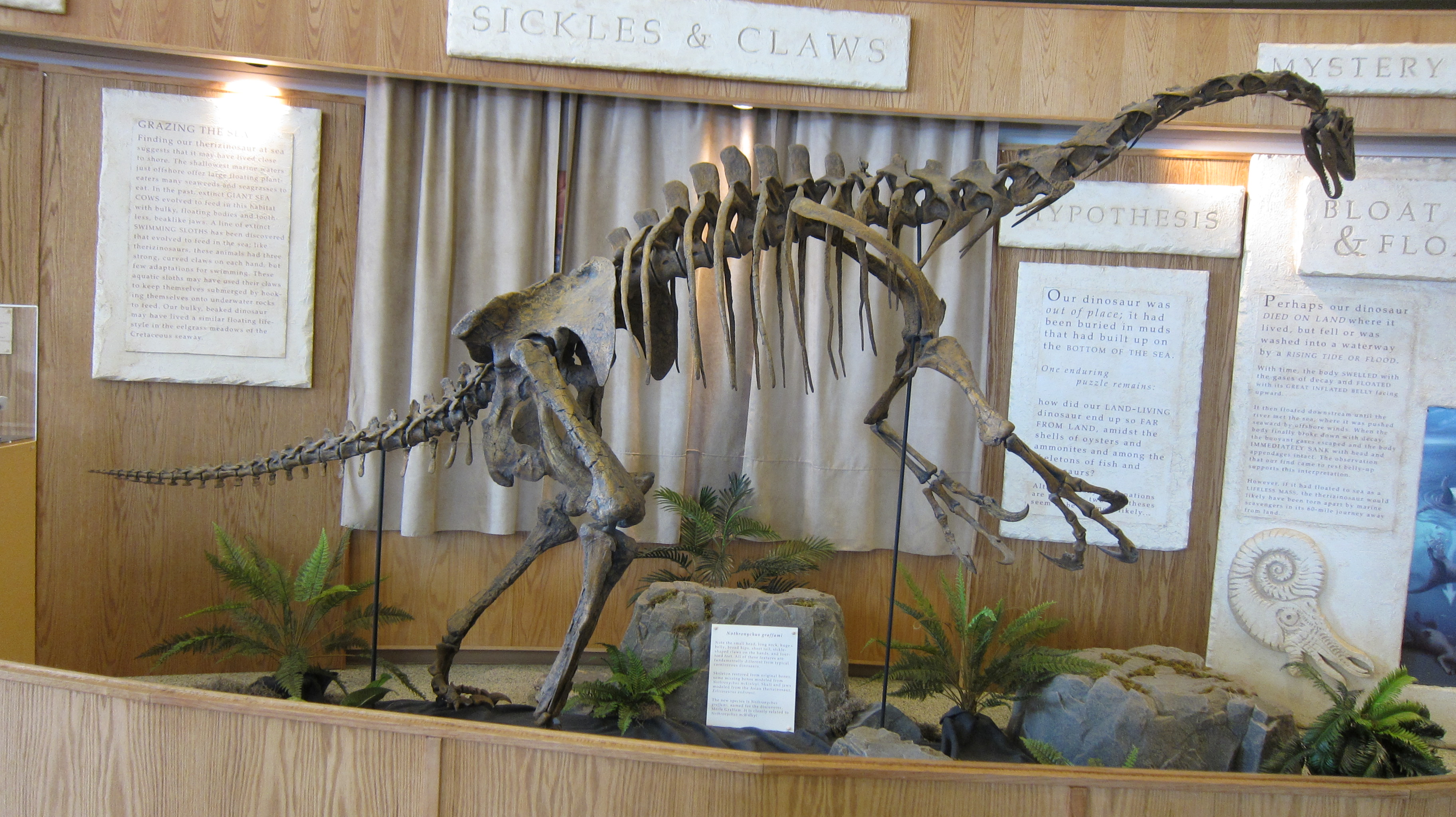
- Mounted fossilized skeleton of the Late Cretaceous Nothronychus
  †Nothronychus
  - †Nothronychus graffami – type locality for species
- Nucula
- †Odaxosaurus
  - †Odaxosaurus piger – or unidentified comparable form
  - †Odaxosaurus priscus
  - †Odaxosaurus roosevelti – type locality for species
- †Opisthias
- †Ornithomimus
- Ostrea
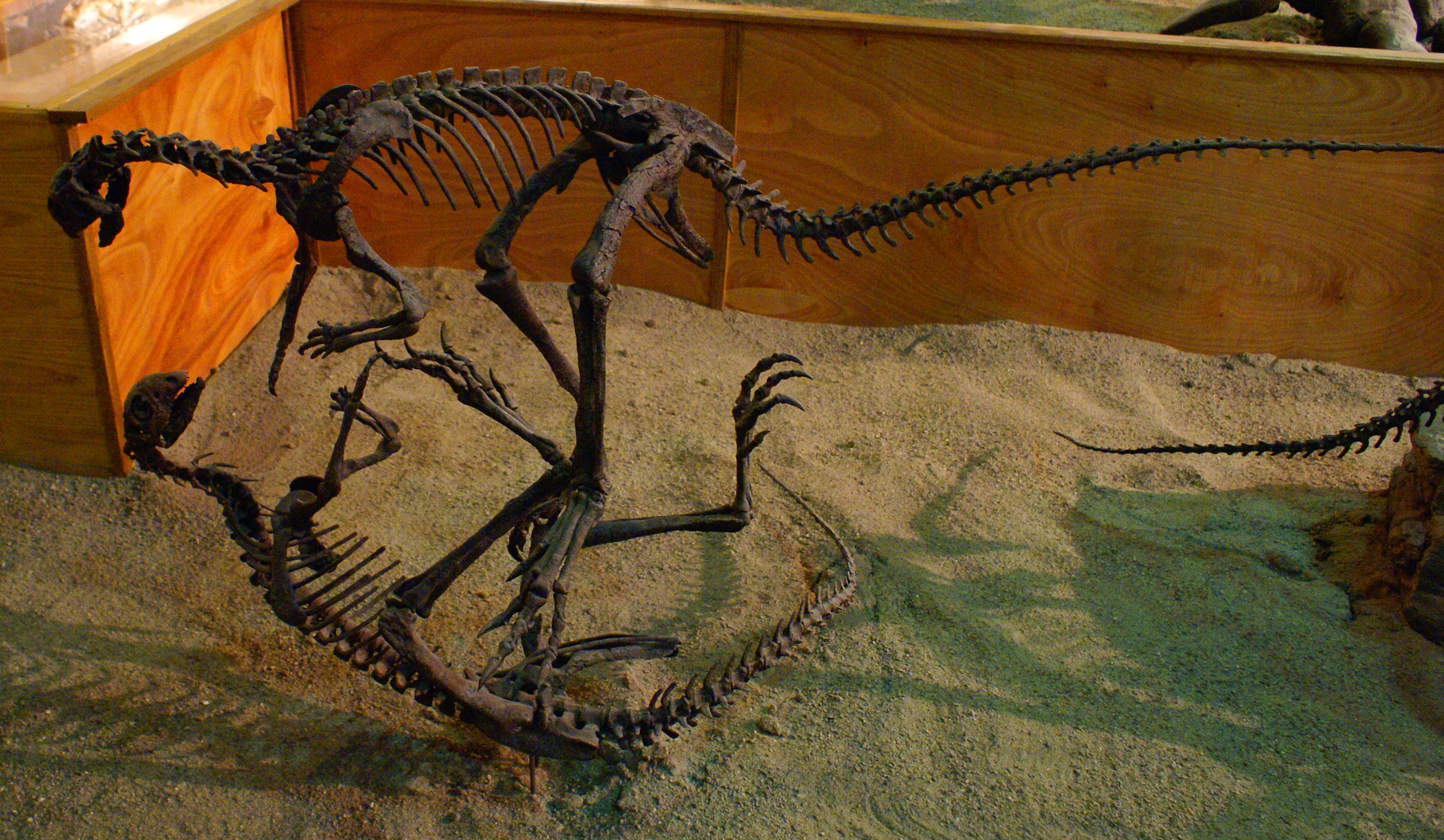
- Mounted fossilized skeleton of the Late Jurassic herbivorous dinosaur Othnielosaurus
  †Othnielosaurus
  - †Othnielosaurus consors
- †Otozoum
- †Ovaloolithus
  - †Ovaloolithus tenuisus – type locality for species
  - †Ovaloolithus utahensis – type locality for species
- †Owenites
  - †Owenites carpenteri
  - †Owenites koeneni
- †Pagiophyllum
- †Palmulasaurus – type locality for genus
  - †Palmulasaurus quadratus – type locality for species
- †Paracimexomys
  - †Paracimexomys judithae – or unidentified comparable form
  - †Paracimexomys magnus
  - †Paracimexomys perplexus – type locality for species
  - †Paracimexomys priscus – or unidentified comparable form
  - †Paracimexomys robisoni – type locality for species
- †Paramacellodus
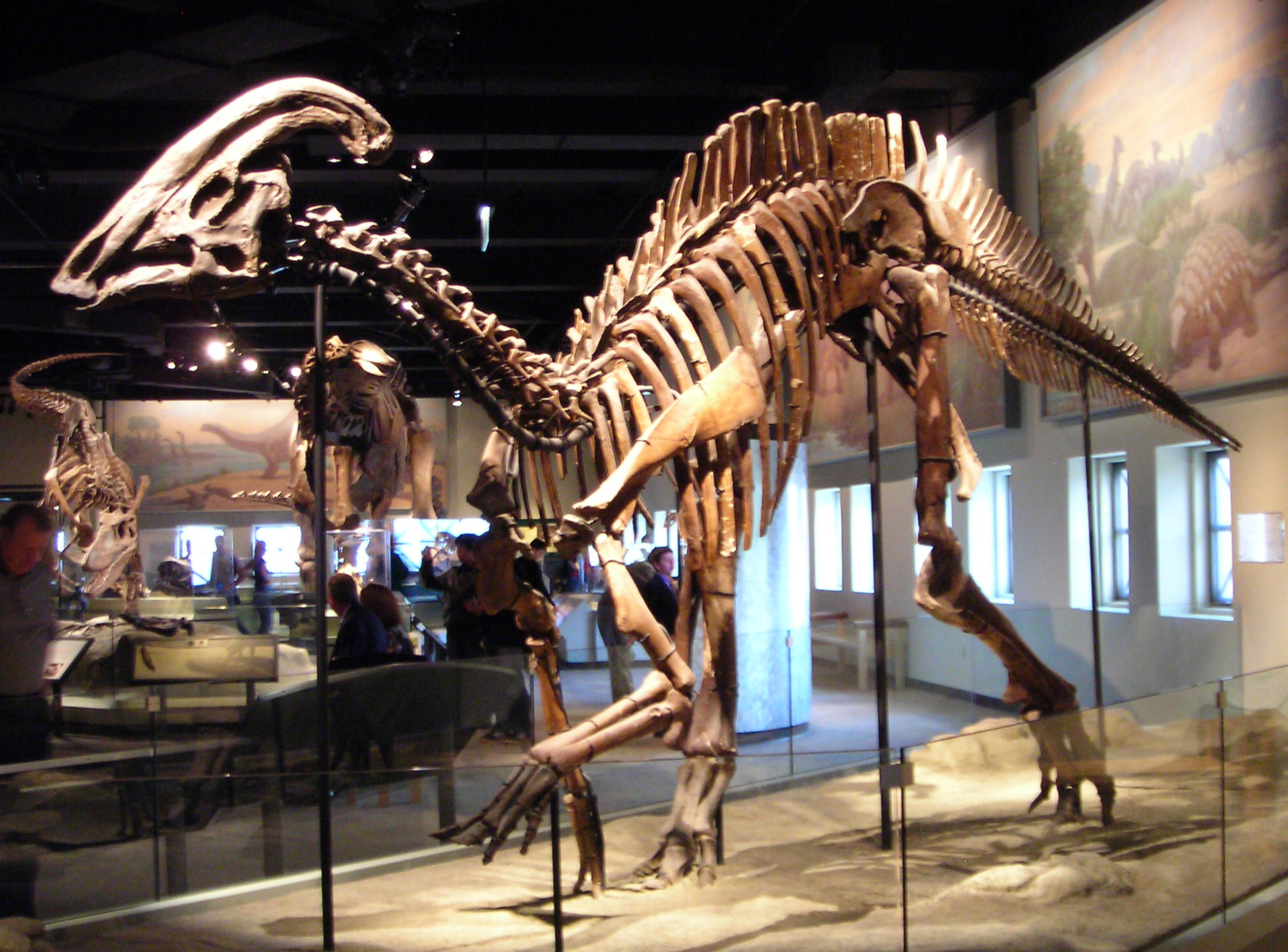
- Mounted fossilized skeleton of the Late Cretaceous duck-billed dinosaur Parasaurolophus
  †Parasaurolophus
  - †Parasaurolophus cyrtocristatus
- †Paronychodon – or unidentified comparable form
- †Parotosuchus
- †Peloroplites – type locality for genus
  - †Peloroplites cedrimontanus – type locality for species
- Pholadomya
  - †Pholadomya inaequiplicata
  - †Pholadomya kingi
- †Pinacosuchus – type locality for genus
  - †Pinacosuchus mantiensis – type locality for species
- Pinna
- †Pistia – report made of unidentified related form or using admittedly obsolete nomenclature
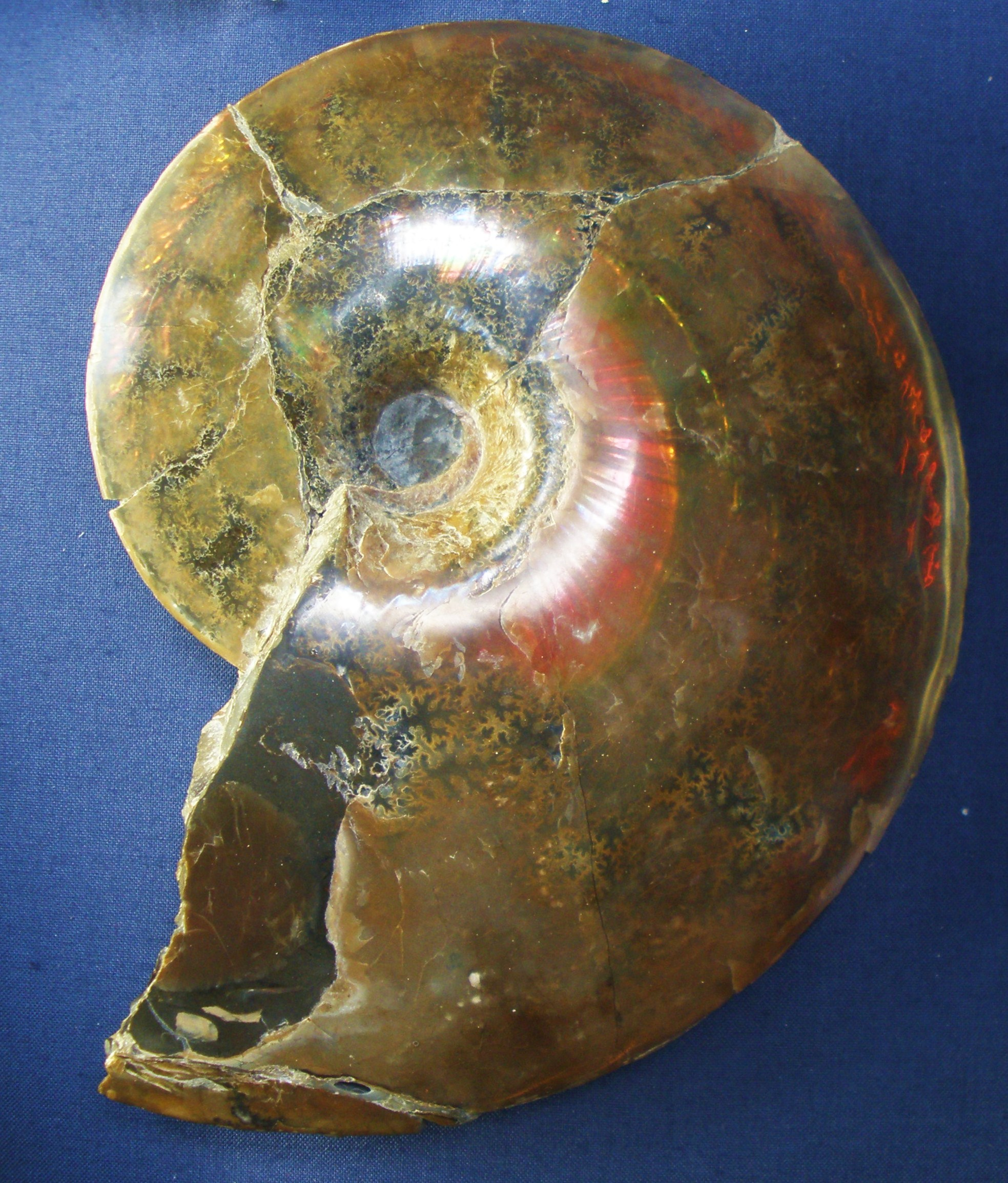
- Fossilized shell of the Late Cretaceous ammonoid cephalopod Placenticeras
  †Placenticeras
  - †Placenticeras cumminsi
- †Plagiostoma
- †Planicoxa – type locality for genus
  - †Planicoxa venenica – type locality for species
- †Planolites
- †Pleuronautilus
- Pleurotomaria – tentative report
- Plicatula
- †Poposaurus
  - †Poposaurus gracilis
- †Preprismatoolithus
- †Priacodon
- †Prismatoolithus
  - †Prismatoolithus jenseni – type locality for species
- †Proplacenticeras
- †Protocardia
- †Pseudomelania
- †Pseudotetrasauropus
- †Pteraichnus
  - †Pteraichnus saltwashensis – or unidentified comparable form
  - †Pteraichnus stokesi – or unidentified comparable form
- Pycnodonte
  - †Pycnodonte newberryi
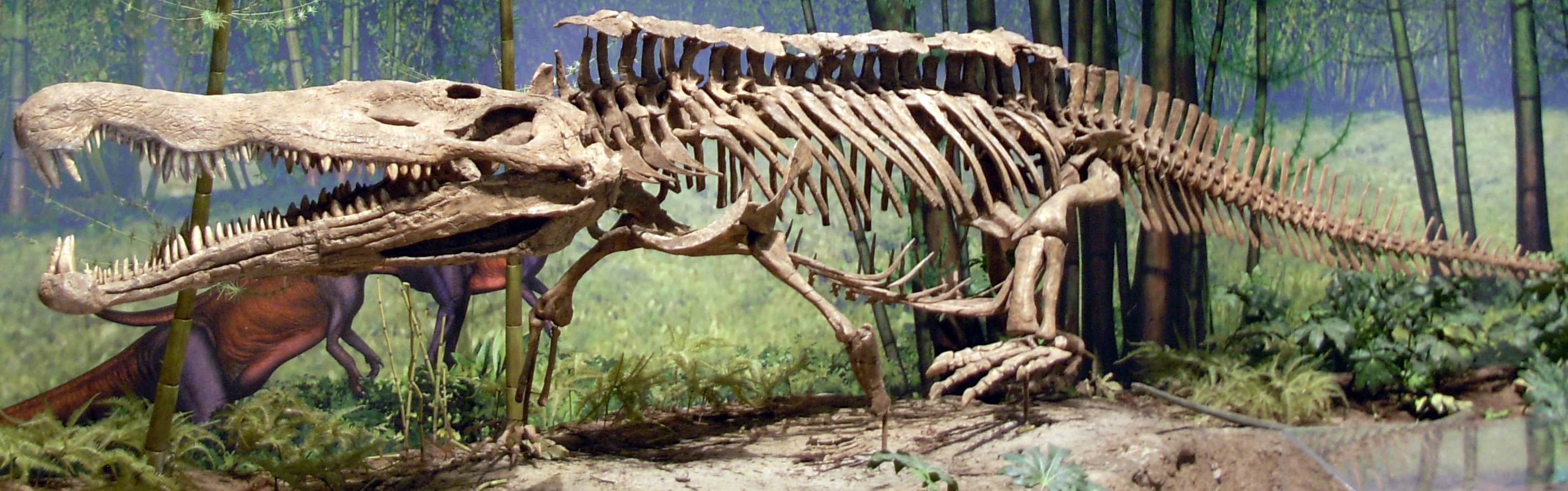
- Fossilized skeleton of the Late Triassic phytosaur Redondasaurus
  †Redondasaurus
  - †Redondasaurus gregorii
- †Rhadinosteus – type locality for genus
  - †Rhadinosteus parvus – type locality for species
- †Rhynchonella – report made of unidentified related form or using admittedly obsolete nomenclature
- †Richardoestesia
  - †Richardoestesia isosceles – or unidentified comparable form
- Rogerella
- Salix
- †Sauropelta – or unidentified comparable form
- †Scalamagnus
  - †Scalamagnus tropicensis – type locality for species
- †Scapherpeton
- †Schillerosaurus – type locality for genus
- †Scotiophryne
- †Scoyenia
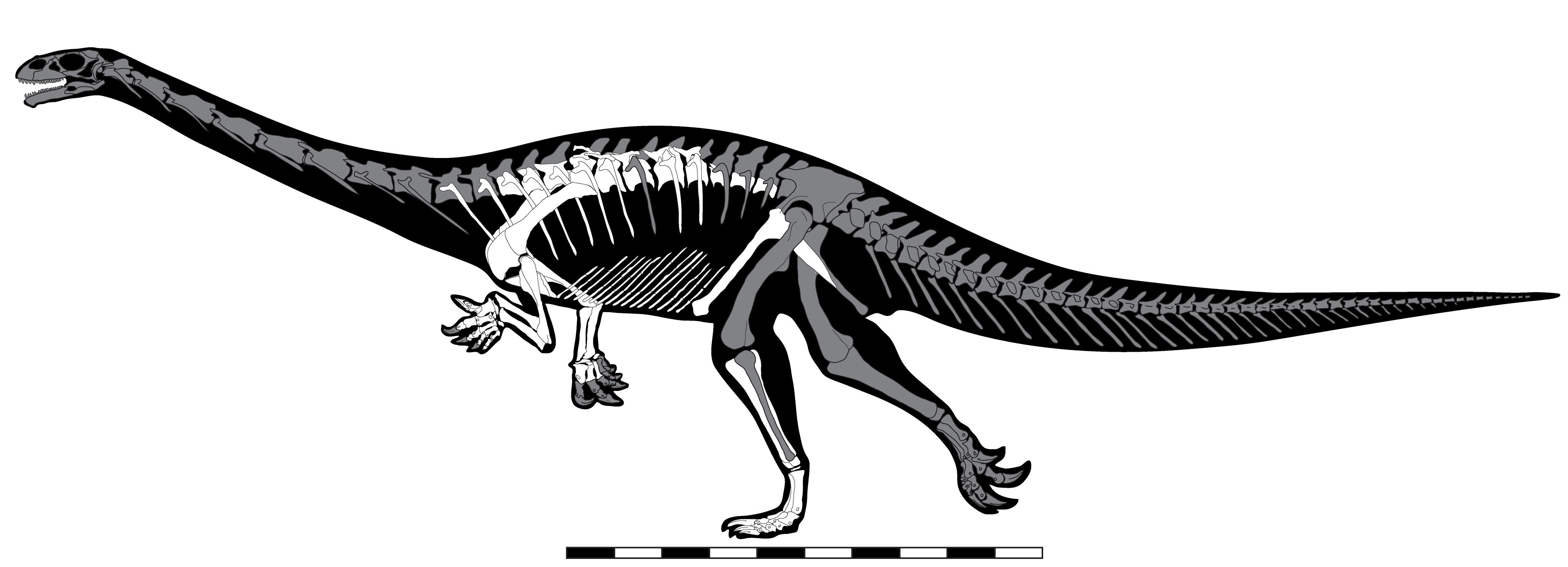
- Known material diagram of the Early Jurassic primitive long-necked dinosaur Seitaad
  †Seitaad – type locality for genus
  - †Seitaad ruessi – type locality for species
- †Semionotus
  - †Semionotus kanabensis – type locality for species
- Serpula
- †Sexta
- †Siats – type locality for genus
  - †Siats meekerorum – type locality for species
- †Skolithos
- Solemya
- †Spheroolithus
- Spirorbis – report made of unidentified related form or using admittedly obsolete nomenclature
- †Squatirhina
  - †Squatirhina americana
- †Stagonolepis
- †Stegopodus – type locality for genus
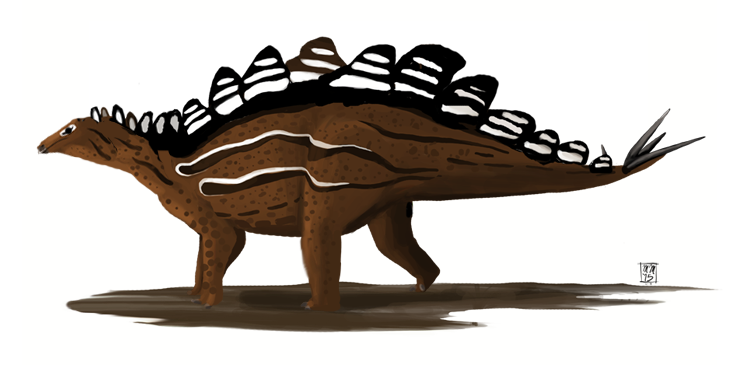
- Restoration of the Late Jurassic stegosaur Stegosaurus
  †Stegosaurus
  - †Stegosaurus stenops – or unidentified comparable form
  - †Stegosaurus ungulatus
- †Stephanoceras
- †Stokesosaurus – type locality for genus
  - †Stokesosaurus clevelandi – type locality for species
- †Talos – type locality for genus
  - †Talos sampsoni – type locality for species
- †Tanycolagreus
  - †Tanycolagreus topwilsoni
- †Tempskya
  - †Tempskya jonesii – type locality for species
  - †Tempskya knowltoni
  - †Tempskya minor
  - †Tempskya superba
  - †Tempskya whiteheadi – type locality for species
- †Tenontosaurus
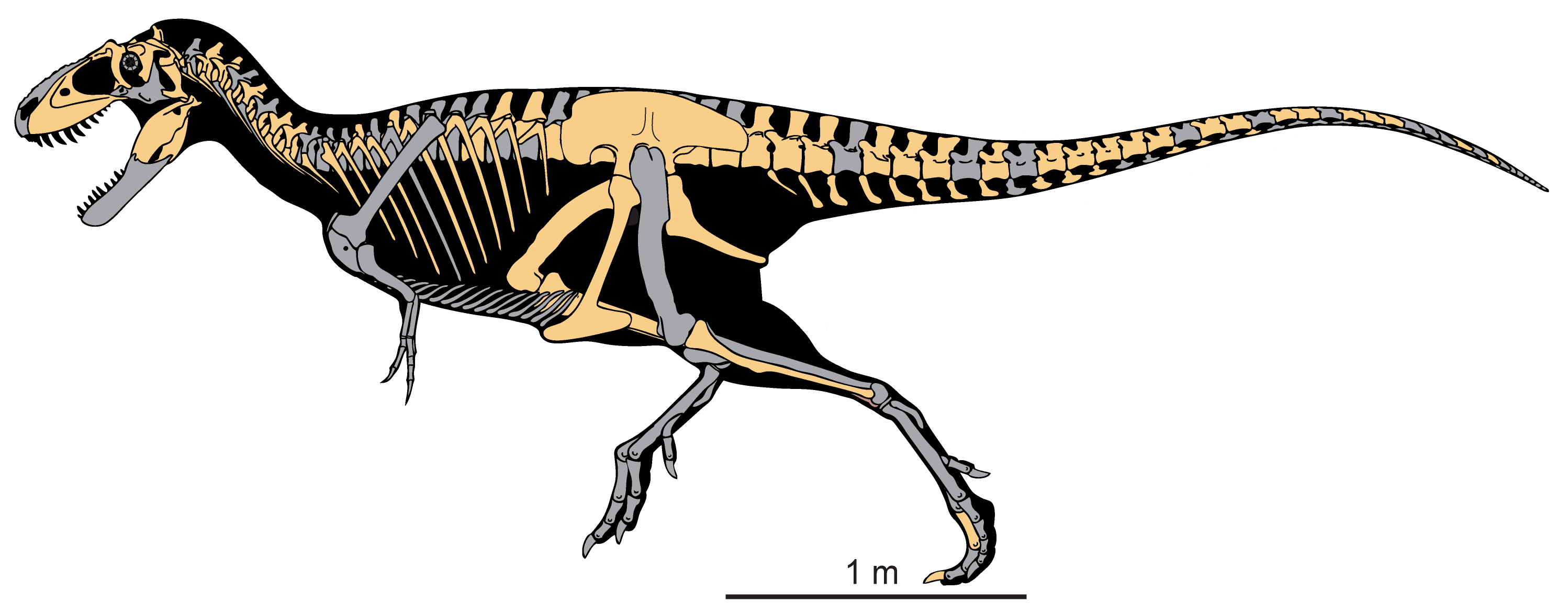
- Known material diagram of the Late Cretaceous tyrannosaur Teratophoneus
  †Teratophoneus – type locality for genus
  - †Teratophoneus curriei – type locality for species
- Teredolites
- †Tetrasauropus
- †Thalassinoides
- †Therangospodus – type locality for genus
- †Theretairus
- Thracia
- †Torvosaurus
- †Toxolophosaurus – or unidentified comparable form
- †Trachodon
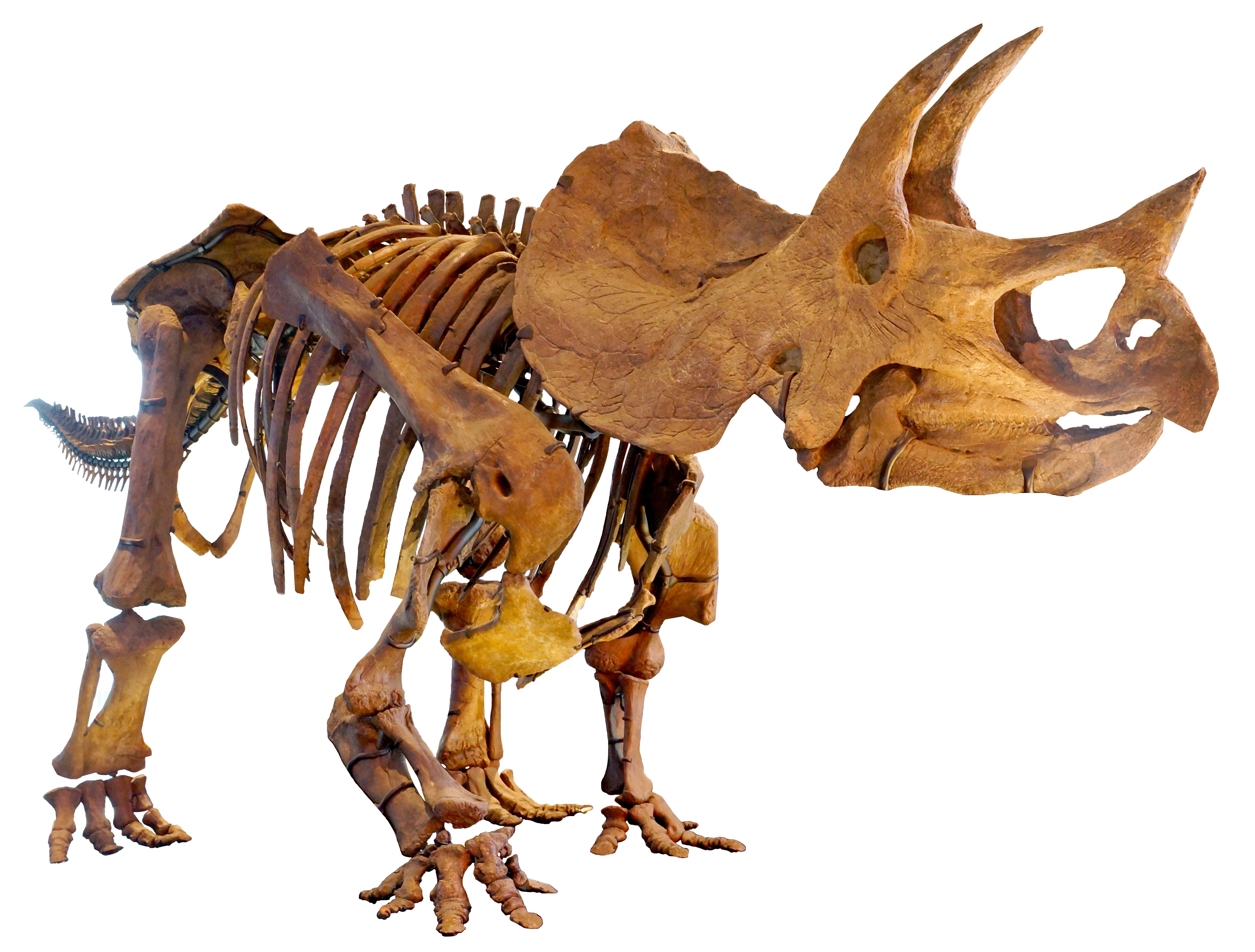
- Mounted fossilized skeleton of the Late Cretaceous horned dinosaur Triceratops
  †Triceratops
- †Triconolestes – type locality for genus
  - †Triconolestes curvicuspis – type locality for species
- †Trigonia
  - †Trigonia americana
  - †Trigonia elegantissima
  - †Trigonia montanaensis
- †Trinacromerum
  - †Trinacromerum bentonianum – tentative report
- †Trisauropodiscus
- Turritella
- †Tyrannosauripus – type locality for genus
- †Ussurites
  - †Ussurites hosei
- †Utahceratops – type locality for genus
  - †Utahceratops gettyi – type locality for species
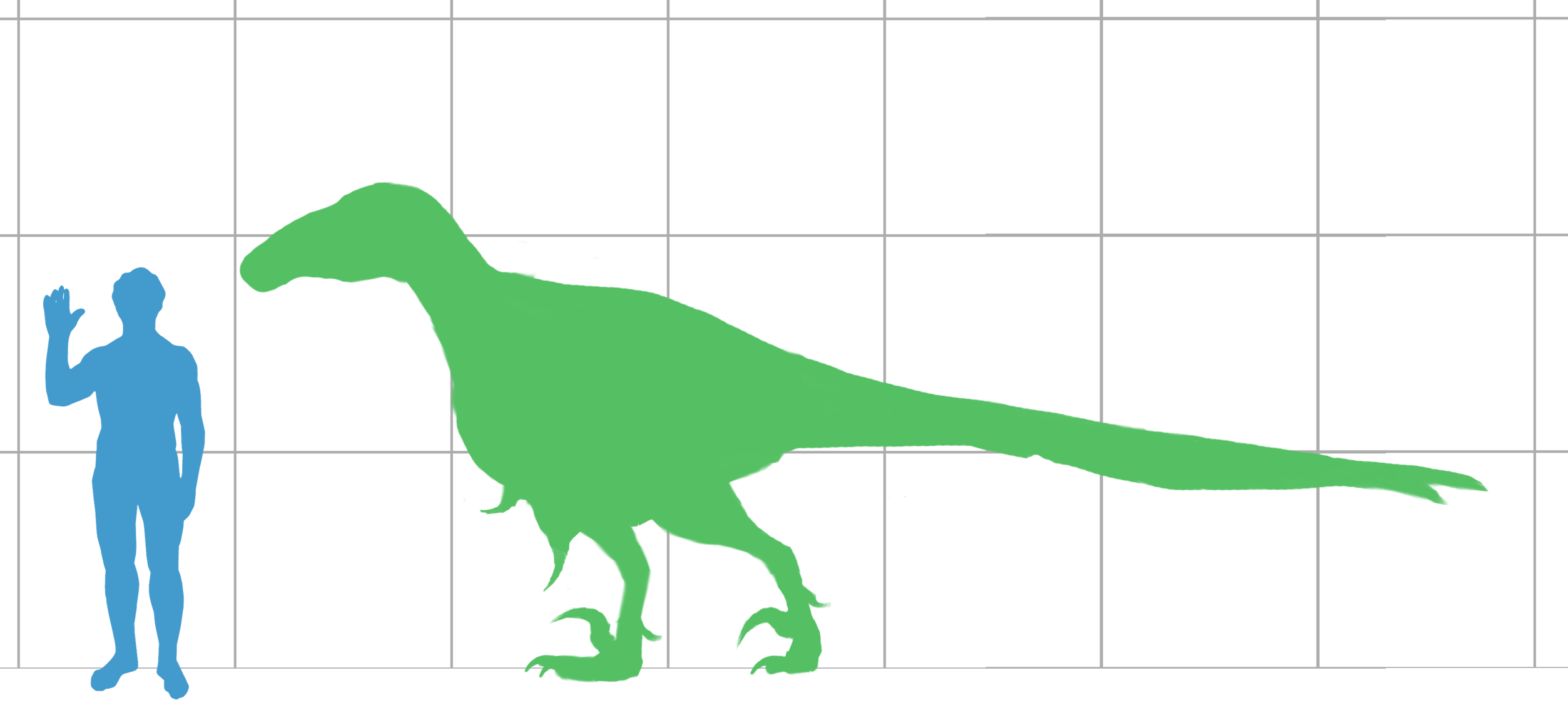
- Diagram illustrating the Early Cretaceous dromaeosaurid ("raptor") Utahraptor with an anachronistic human to scale
  †Utahraptor – type locality for genus
  - †Utahraptor ostrommaysi – type locality for species
- †Uteodon
  - †Uteodon aphanoecetes
- Valvata
- †Vancleavea
  - †Vancleavea campi
- †Venenosaurus – type locality for genus
  - †Venenosaurus dicrocei – type locality for species
- †Vex
- Viviparus
- †Worthenia
  - †Worthenia windowblindensis – type locality for species
- †Wyomingites
- †Xenoceltites
  - †Xenoceltites cordilleranus
  - †Xenoceltites subevolutus
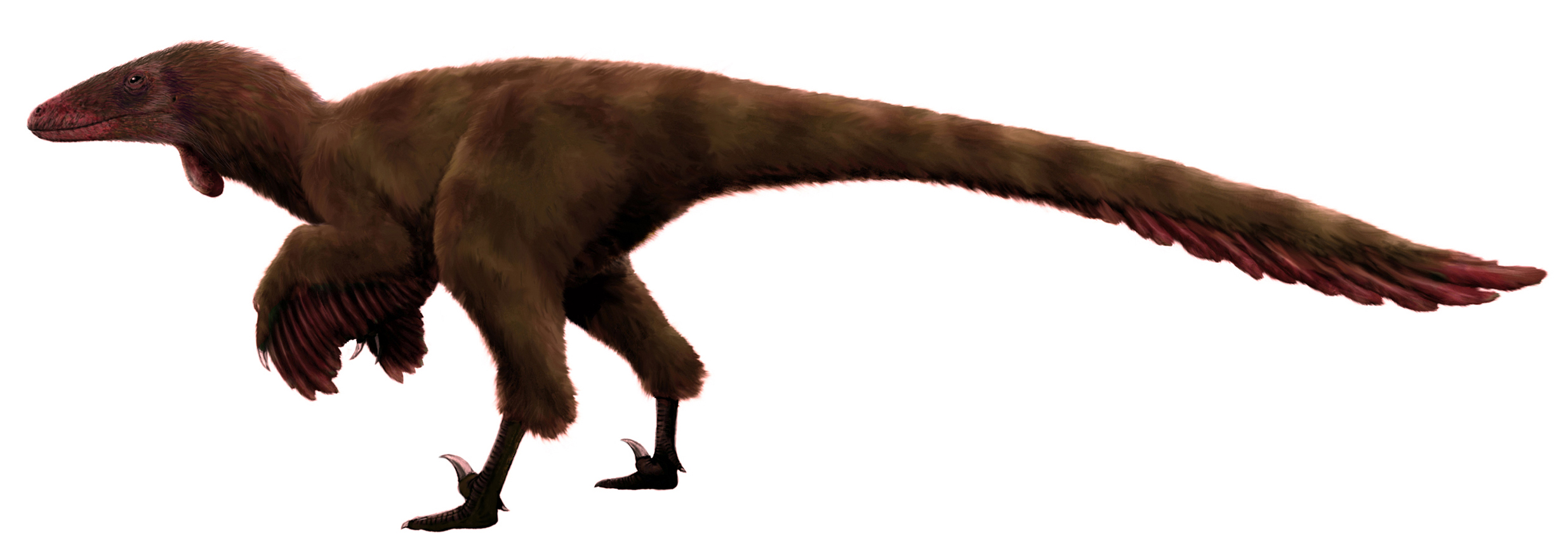
- Life restoration of the Early Cretaceous dromaeosaurid ("raptor") Yurgovuchia
  †Yurgovuchia – type locality for genus
  - †Yurgovuchia doellingi – type locality for species
- †Zamites
  - †Zamites powelli
  - †Zamites tidwellii – type locality for species

== Cenozoic ==
=== Selected Cenozoic taxa of Utah ===
- Abies
- †Acrocera
- †Agriochoerus
- Alligator
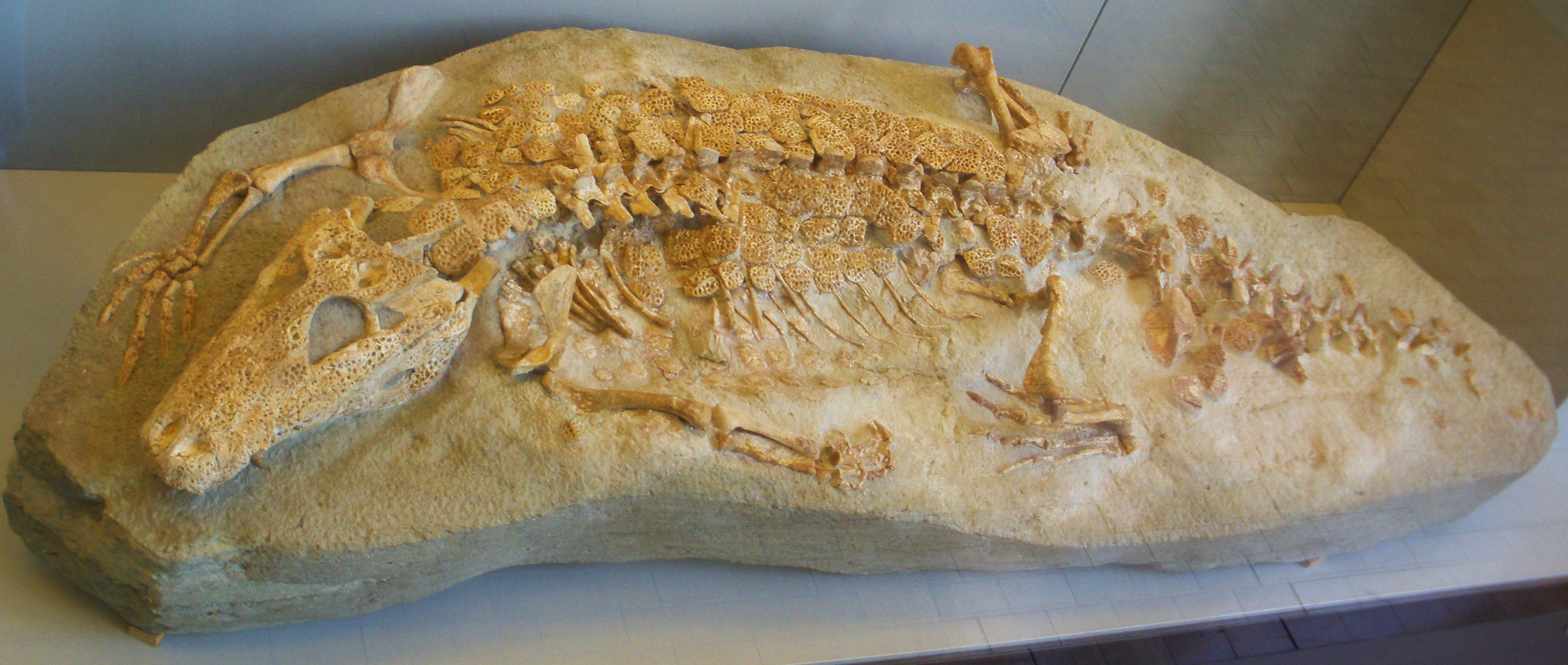
- Fossilized skeleton of the Late Cretaceous-Oligocene Alligator relative Allognathosuchus
  †Allognathosuchus – or unidentified comparable form
- Amia
- Amyda
- †Anosteira
- Anthonomus
- Antilocapra
  - †Antilocapra americana – or unidentified comparable form
- Apalone
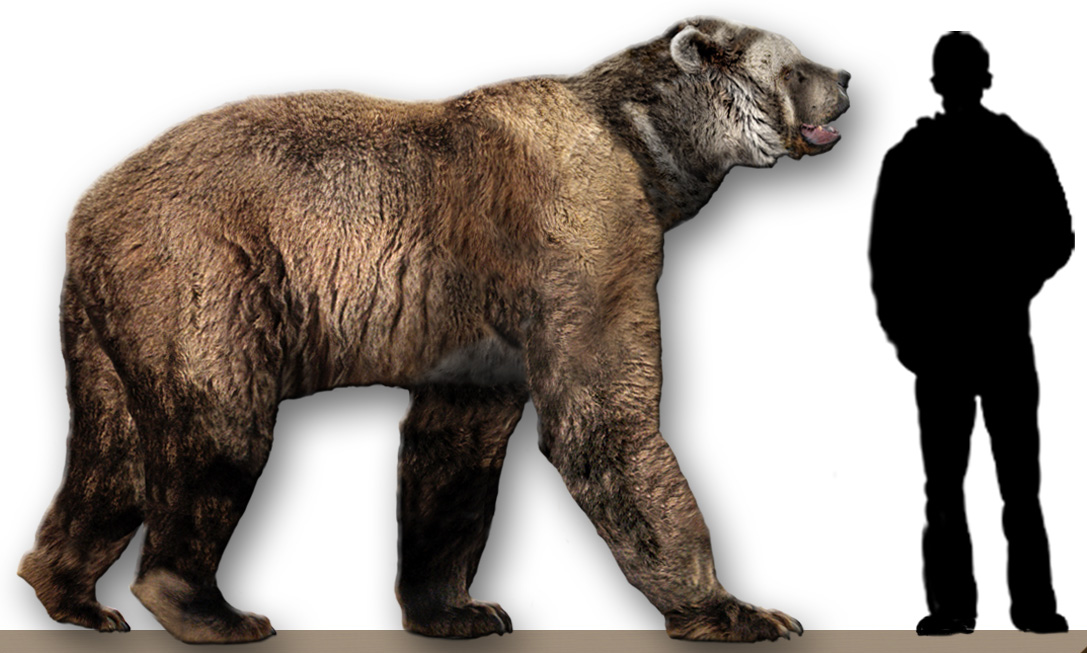
- Restoration of an Arctodus, or short-faced bear, with a human to scale
  †Arctodus
  - †Arctodus simus
- †Artemisia
- †Baena
- †Basirepomys
- †Bembidium
- Bison
  - †Bison latifrons – tentative report
- †Bittacus
- †Bootherium
  - †Bootherium bombifrons
- †Boverisuchus
  - †Boverisuchus vorax – type locality for species
- †Brachyhyops
- Brachylagus
  - †Brachylagus idahoensis – or unidentified comparable form
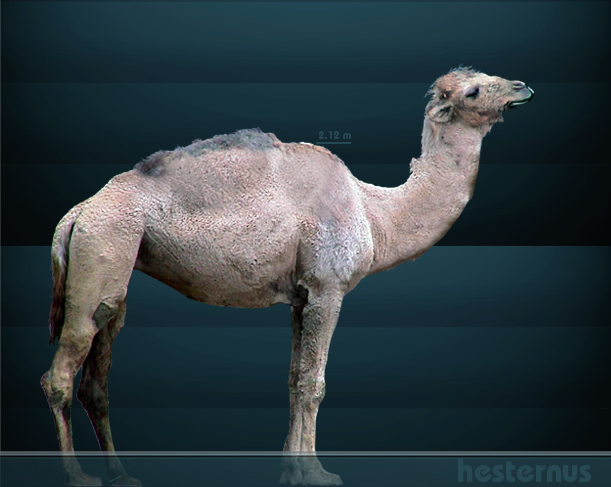
- Life restoration of the Pliocene-Holocene camel Camelops
  †Camelops
  - †Camelops hesternus – or unidentified comparable form
- Camponotus
- Canis
  - †Canis dirus – or unidentified comparable form
  - †Canis latrans – tentative report
  - †Canis lupus
- †Catopsalis
  - †Catopsalis fissidens
- †Champsosaurus
- Chara
- Cheilosia
- †Chipetaia
  - †Chipetaia lamporea – type locality for species
- †Chisternon
- †Chriacus
- †Colodon
- †Compsemys
- †Coniatus
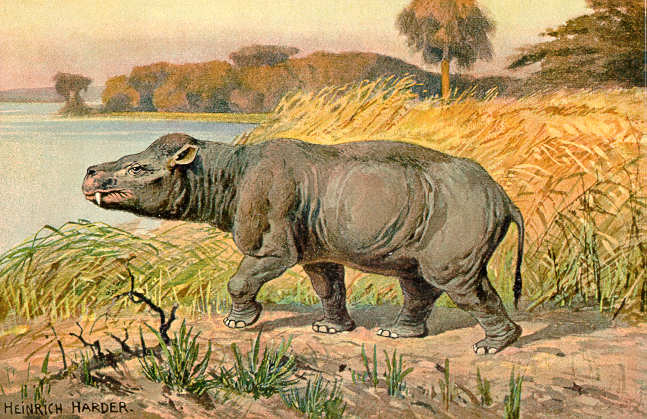
- Life restoration of the Paleocene-Eocene pantodont mammal Coryphodon. Heinrich Harder (1920).
  †Coryphodon
- Crocodylus
  - †Crocodylus acer – type locality for species
  - †Crocodylus affinis
- Culex
- †Cuterebra
- Dicranomyia
- †Dinohippus
- †Diplacodon
- †Diprionomys
- †Duchesnehippus
- †Duchesneodus
- †Echmatemys
- †Ectoconus
- †Elliptio
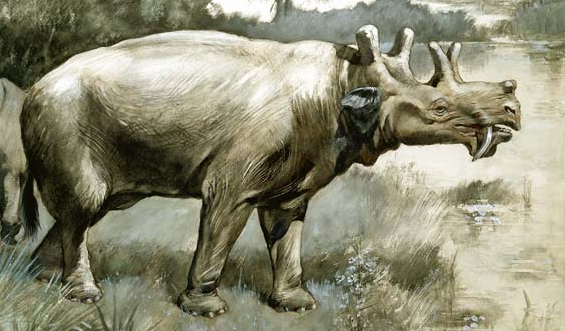
- Life restoration of a pair of the Eocene uintathere mammal Eobasileus. Charles R. Knight (1890s).
  †Eobasileus
  - †Eobasileus cornutus
- †Eoconodon
- †Eonessa – type locality for genus
  - †Eonessa anaticula – type locality for species
- †Epicaerus
- †Epihippus
- †Epiphanis
- Equus
  - †Equus conversidens – tentative report
- Erethizon
  - †Erethizon dorsatum – tentative report
- †Eucastor
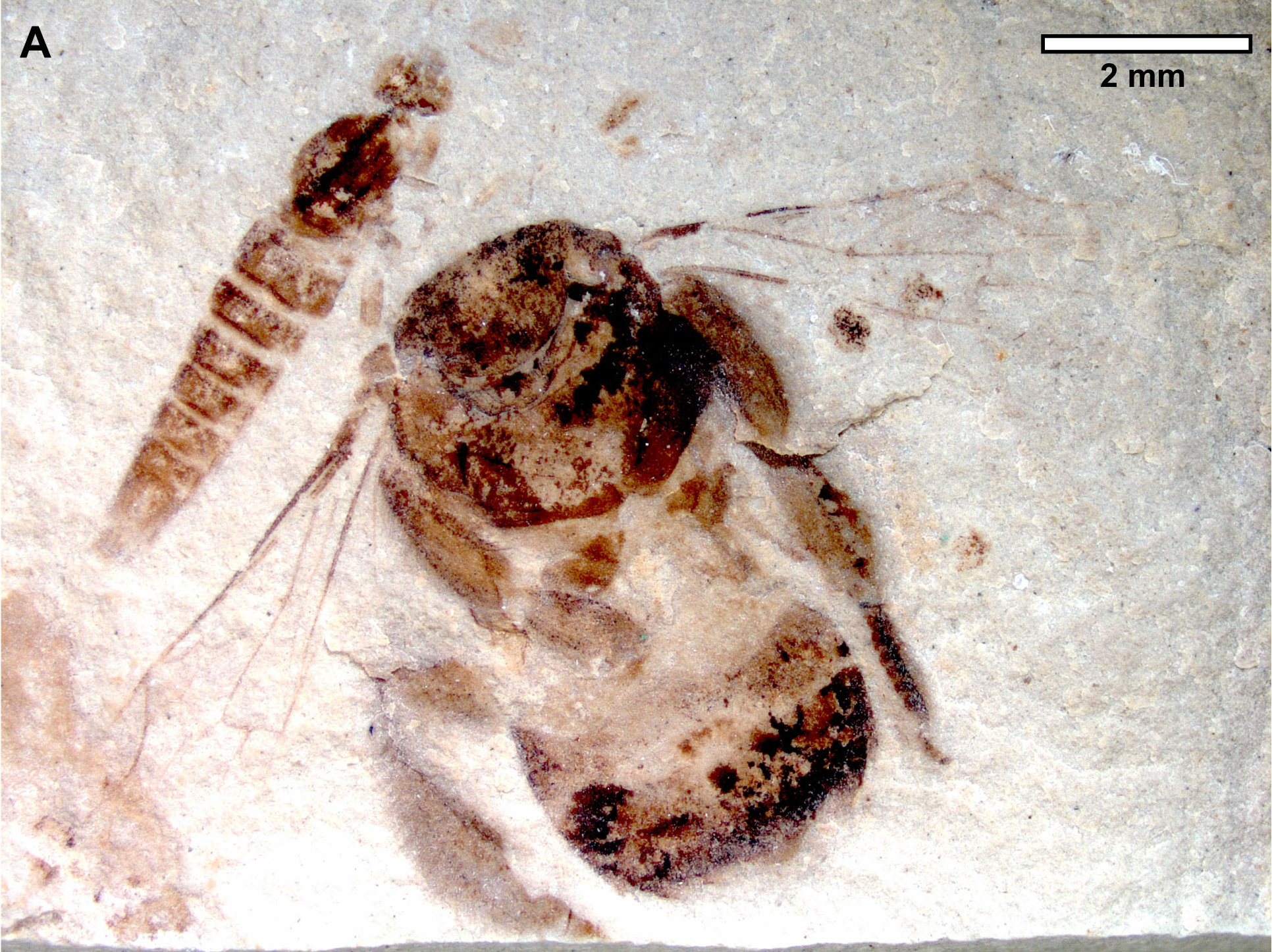
- Fossil of the Eocene bee Euglossopteryx
  †Euglossopteryx – type locality for genus
  - †Euglossopteryx biesmeijeri – type locality for species
- Eutamias
  - †Eutamias minimus
- †Goniacodon
- †Hadrianus
- †Haplolambda – or unidentified comparable form
- †Harpagolestes
- †Helaletes
- †Helodermoides – tentative report
- †Herpetotherium
- †Heteraletes
- †Hoplochelys
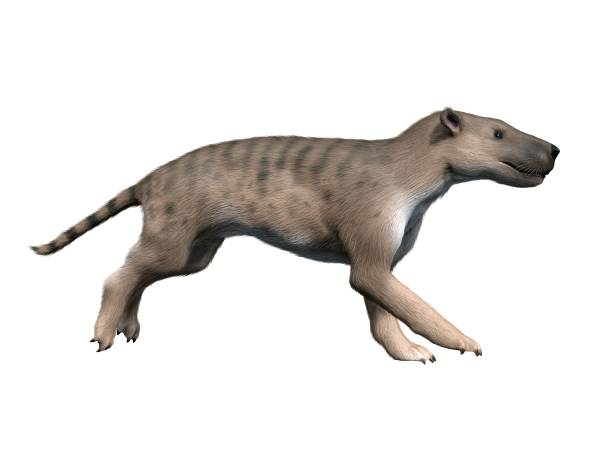
- Life restoration of the Eocene-Miocene creodont mammal Hyaenodon
  †Hyaenodon
  - †Hyaenodon vetus – or unidentified comparable form
- Hydrobia – or unidentified comparable form
- †Hylobius
- †Hyopsodus
- †Hypohippus
- †Hypolagus
- †Hyrachyus
- †Hyracodon
- †Hyracotherium
  - †Hyracotherium vasacciense
- †Kimbetohia
- Laccophilus
- †Lambdotherium
- Lemmiscus
  - †Lemmiscus curtatus
- Lepisosteus
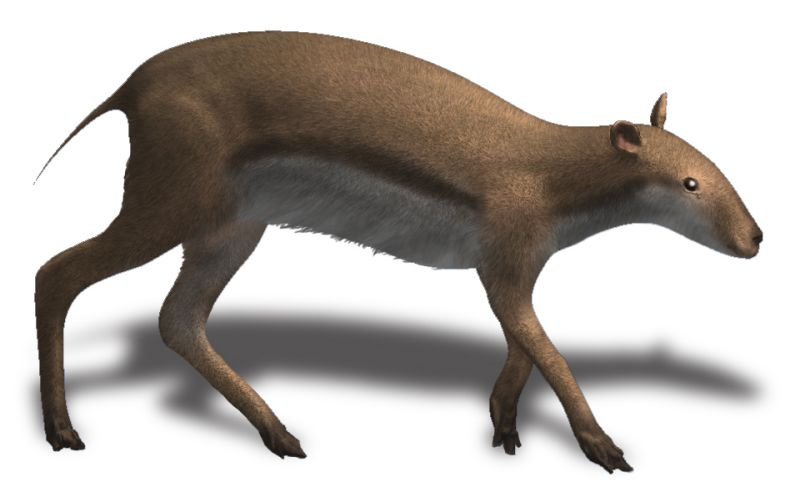
- Life restoration of the Eocene-Oligocene even-toed ungulate Leptomeryx
  †Leptomeryx
- †Leptoreodon
- †Leptotragulus
- Lepus
  - †Lepus townsendii – or unidentified comparable form
- †Limnocyon
  - †Limnocyon verus – or unidentified comparable form
- Lynx
  - †Lynx canadensis – or unidentified comparable form
- †Mammut
  - †Mammut americanum
- †Mammuthus
  - †Mammuthus columbi
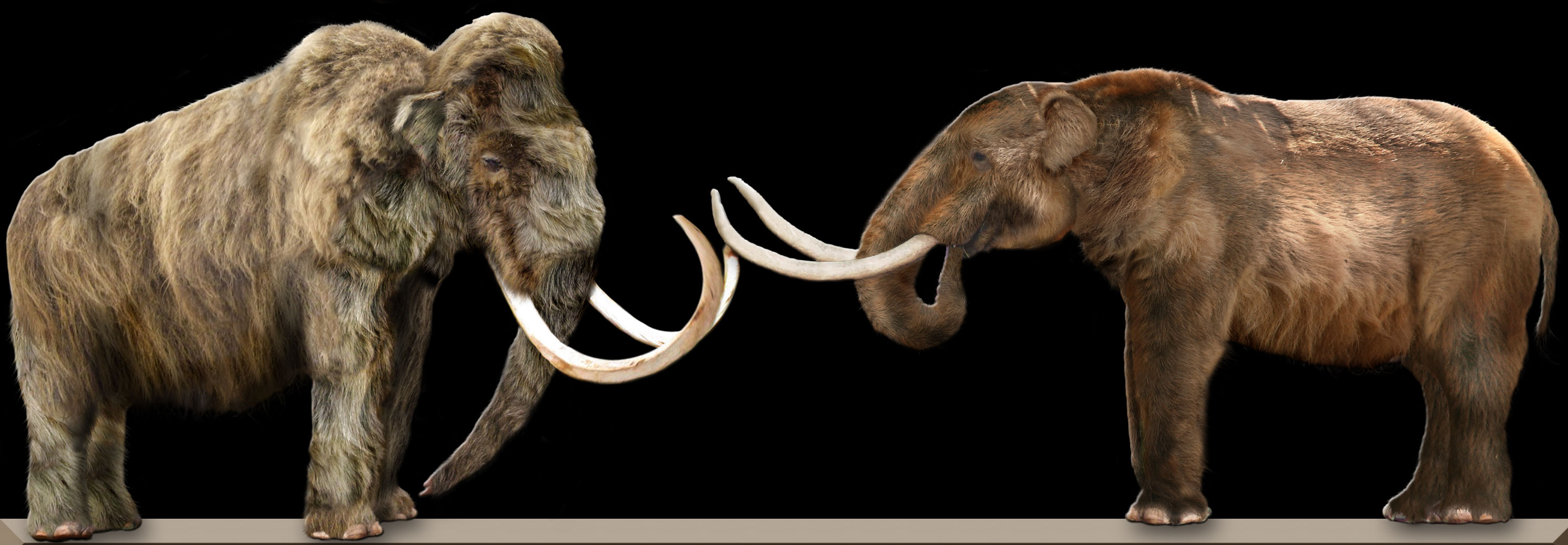
  - Life restorations of a Mammut americanum, or American mastodon (right), and a Mammuthus primigenius, or wooly mammoth (left)
    †Mammuthus primigenius
- †Megalonyx
  - †Megalonyx jeffersonii
- †Menops
- †Merriamoceros
- †Mesonyx
  - †Mesonyx obtusidens
- †Metaliomys – type locality for genus
- †Metarhinus
- †Metatelmatherium
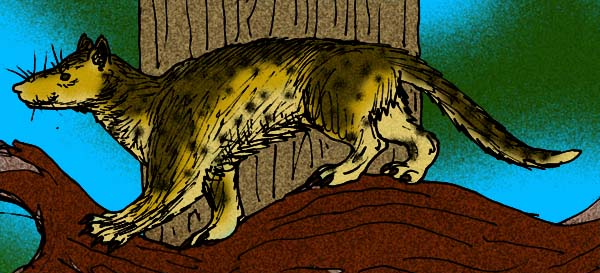
- Life restoration of the Paleocene-Eocene mammal Miacis
  †Miacis
- †Microsyops
- Microtus
  - †Microtus montanus
- †Miocyon
- Mustela
  - †Mustela richardsonii – tentative report
- †Nemotelus
- Neogale
  - †Neogale vison
- †Neoplagiaulax
  - †Neoplagiaulax macintyrei
- Neotamias
- Neotoma
- †Notharctus
  - †Notharctus tenebrosus – or unidentified comparable form
- Odocoileus
- Ondatra
- †Oodectes – tentative report
- Ophryastes
- †Oxyacodon
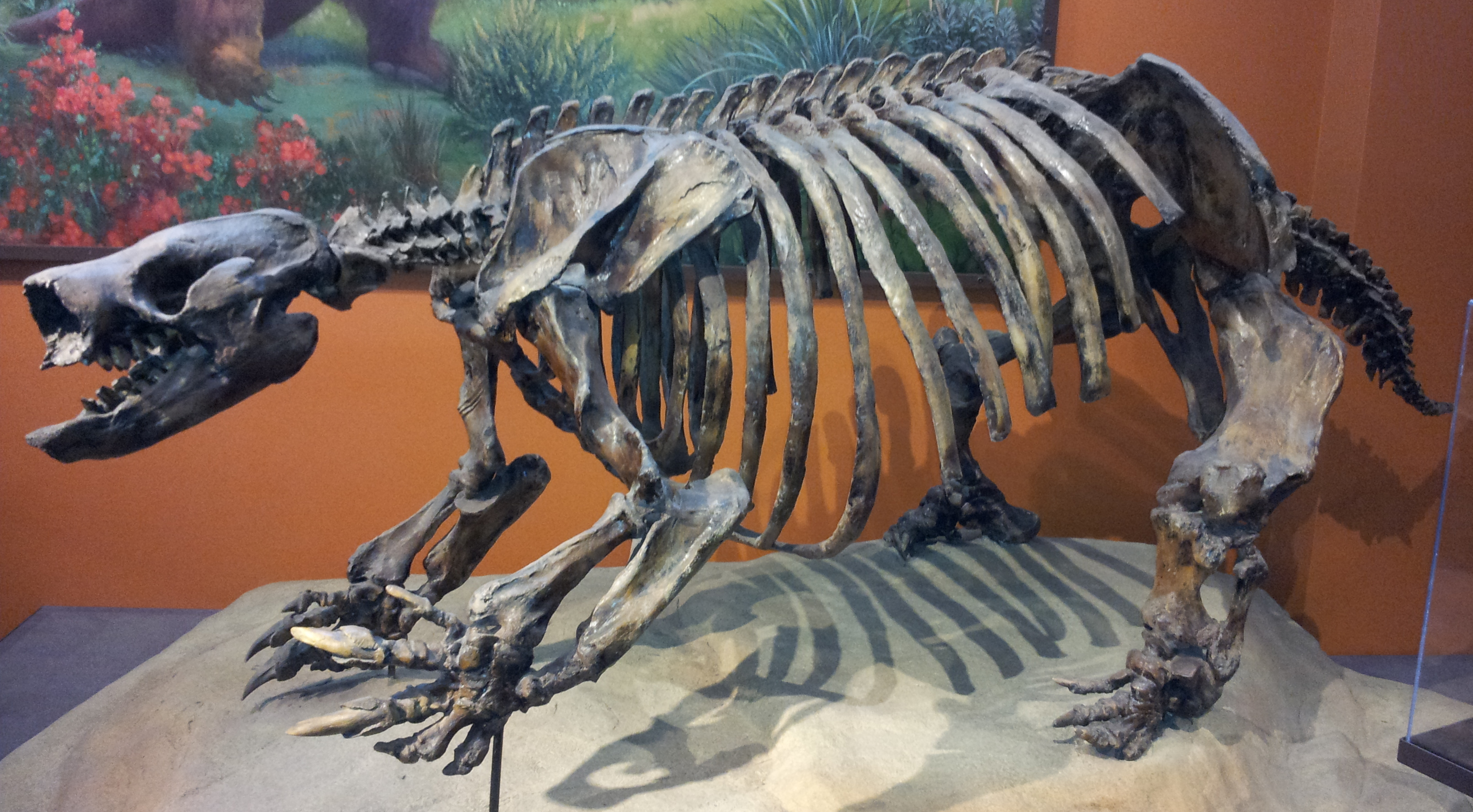
- Fossilized skeleton of the Pliocene-Pleistocene ground sloth Paramylodon
  †Paramylodon
  - †Paramylodon harlani – or unidentified comparable form
- †Paramys
- †Parectypodus
- †Paronychomys
- †Peratherium
- Peromyscus
  - †Peromyscus maniculatus
- Phenacomys
  - †Phenacomys intermedius
- Phyllobius
- †Phyllophaga
- Physa
- Picea
- Pinus
- †Plastomenoides
- Plecia
- †Poabromylus
- †Poebrodon
- †Polemonium – or unidentified comparable form
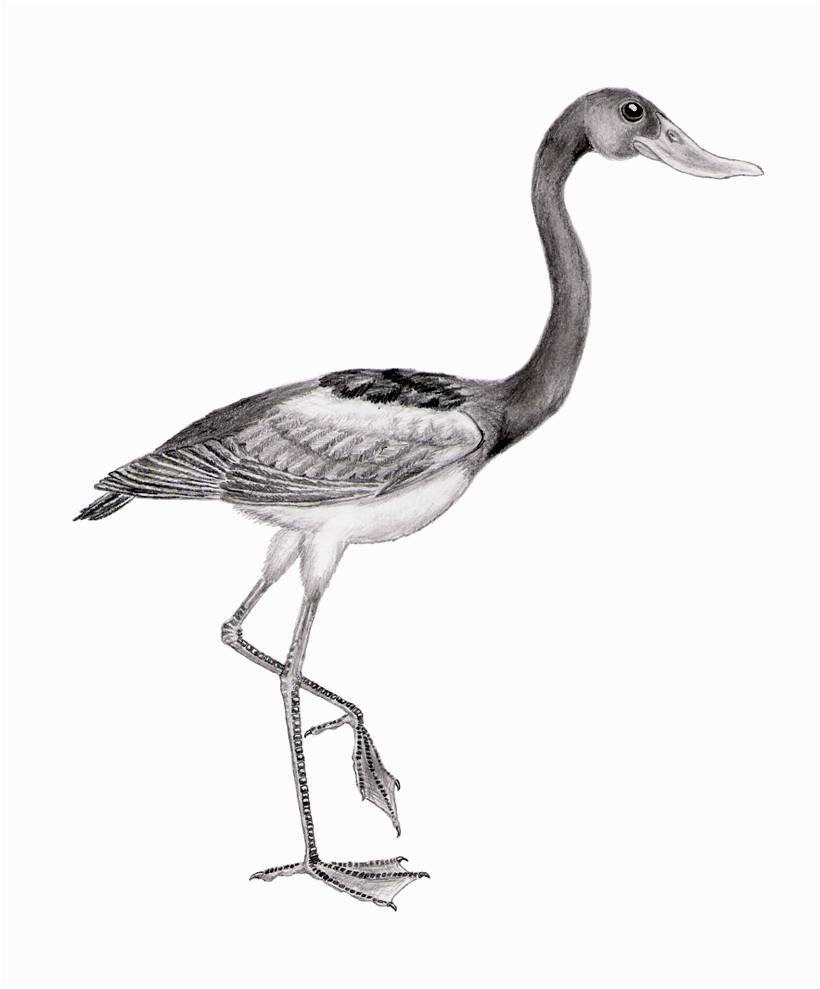
- Life restoration of the Paleocene-Eocene waterfowl Presbyornis
  †Presbyornis – type locality for genus
- †Procaimanoidea – type locality for genus
  - †Procaimanoidea utahensis – type locality for species
- †Procas
- †Procynodictis
- †Prodaphaenus
- †Protitanotherium
- †Protylopus
- †Proviverra
- †Ptilodus
  - †Ptilodus mediaevus
  - †Ptilodus tsosiensis – or unidentified comparable form
- Rhinoclemmys – report made of unidentified related form or using admittedly obsolete nomenclature
- †Saniwa
  - †Saniwa ensidens
- †Sargus
- †Sinopa
- †Smilodectes
  - †Smilodectes gracilis
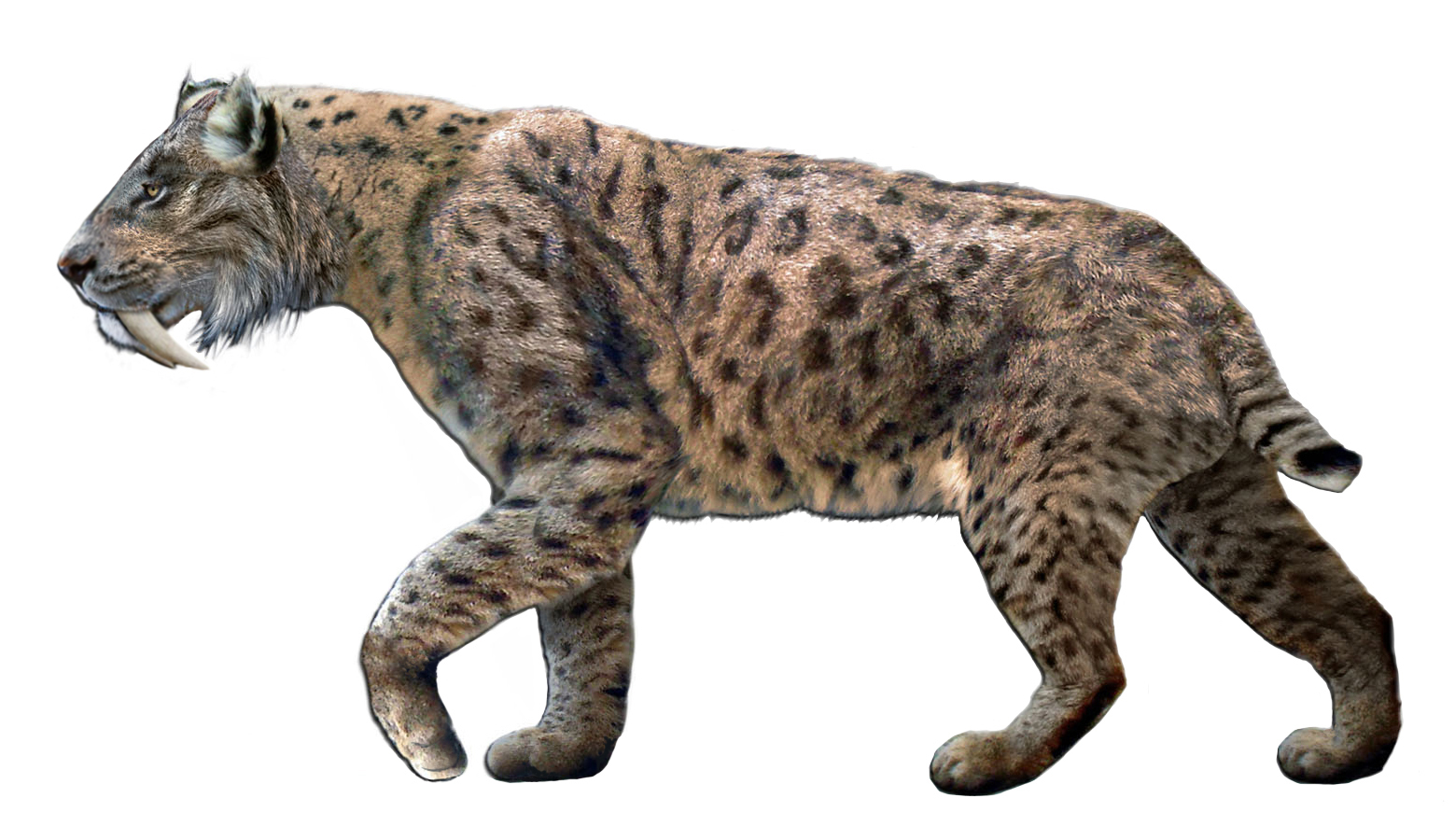
- Life restoration of the Pleistocene-Holocene saber-tooth cat Smilodon
  †Smilodon
  - †Smilodon fatalis – or unidentified comparable form
- Sorex
  - †Sorex palustris
- Spermophilus
  - †Spermophilus armatus – or unidentified comparable form
- †Sphenocoelus
- †Sthenodectes
- †Stygimys
  - †Stygimys kuszmauli
- †Stylemys
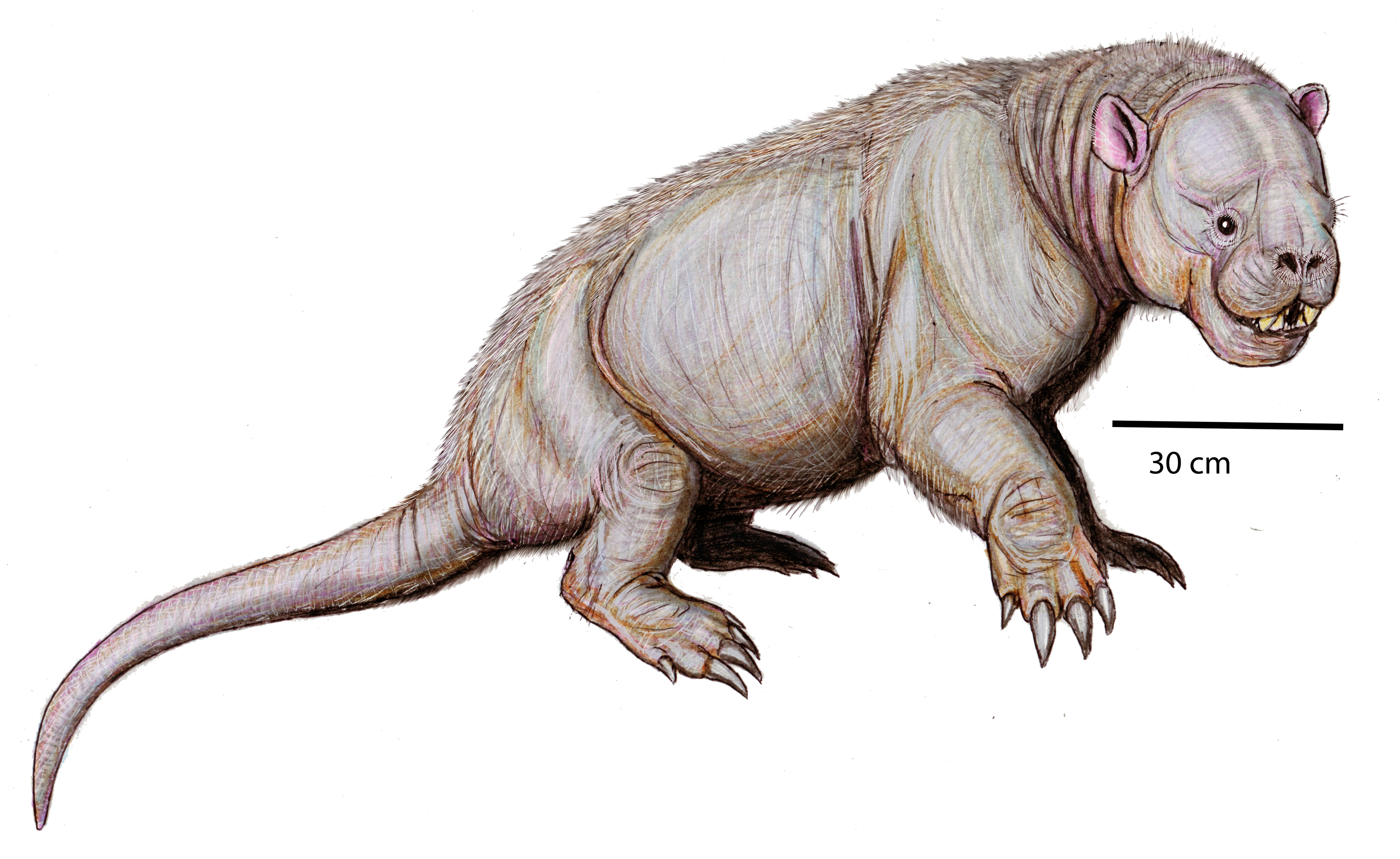
- Life restoration of the Eocene taeniodont mammal Stylinodon mirus
  †Stylinodon
- †Taeniolabis
  - †Taeniolabis taoensis
- †Tapocyon
- Taxidea
  - †Taxidea taxus
- Thomomys
  - †Thomomys talpoides
- †Trogosus
- †Tylocephalonyx
- †Uintacyon
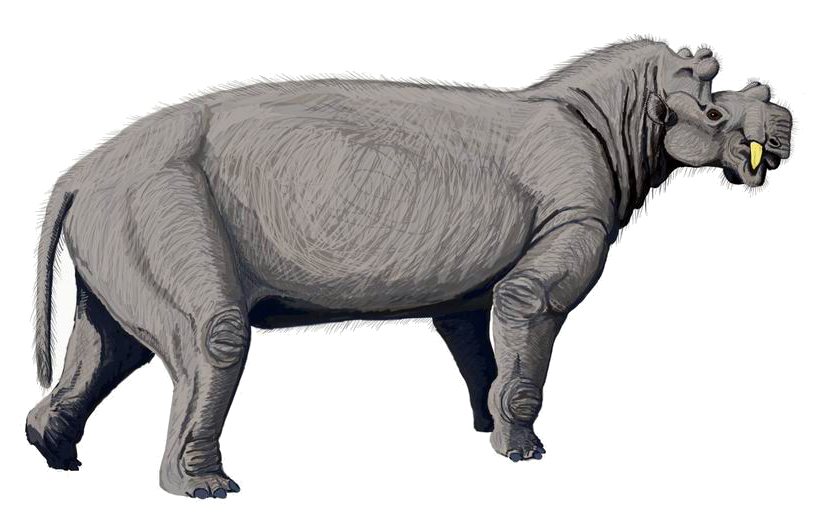
- Life restoration of the Eocene mammal Uintatherium
  †Uintatherium
- †Valenia
- †Viverravus
- Viviparus
- Vulpes
  - †Vulpes vulpes
- Zapus
