= Entomolithus =

Obsolete name for several trilobites

Entomolithus (petrified insect) is an obsolete scientific name for several trilobites, first published by Linnaeus in 1753, before the starting point of zoological nomenclature in a list under the heading "Paradoxus: 3. Entomolithus Monoculi". This is why this first name has no formal status. After the starting point of the zoological nomenclature, the name was published again in 1759, but with a different description. Because scholars incorrectly considered Entomolithus Linnaeus, 1759 a junior homonym, it was later replaced by Entomostracites Wahlenberg, 1818. Although the name as published in 1759 was in fact valid, the International Commission on Zoological Nomenclature decided to suppress Entomolithus Linnaeus, 1759, because this name had gone out of use for a very long time.

Species originally assigned to Entomolithus have been renamed.

- E. paradoxus = Paradoxides paradoxissimus
- E. paradoxus α expansus = Asaphus expansus
