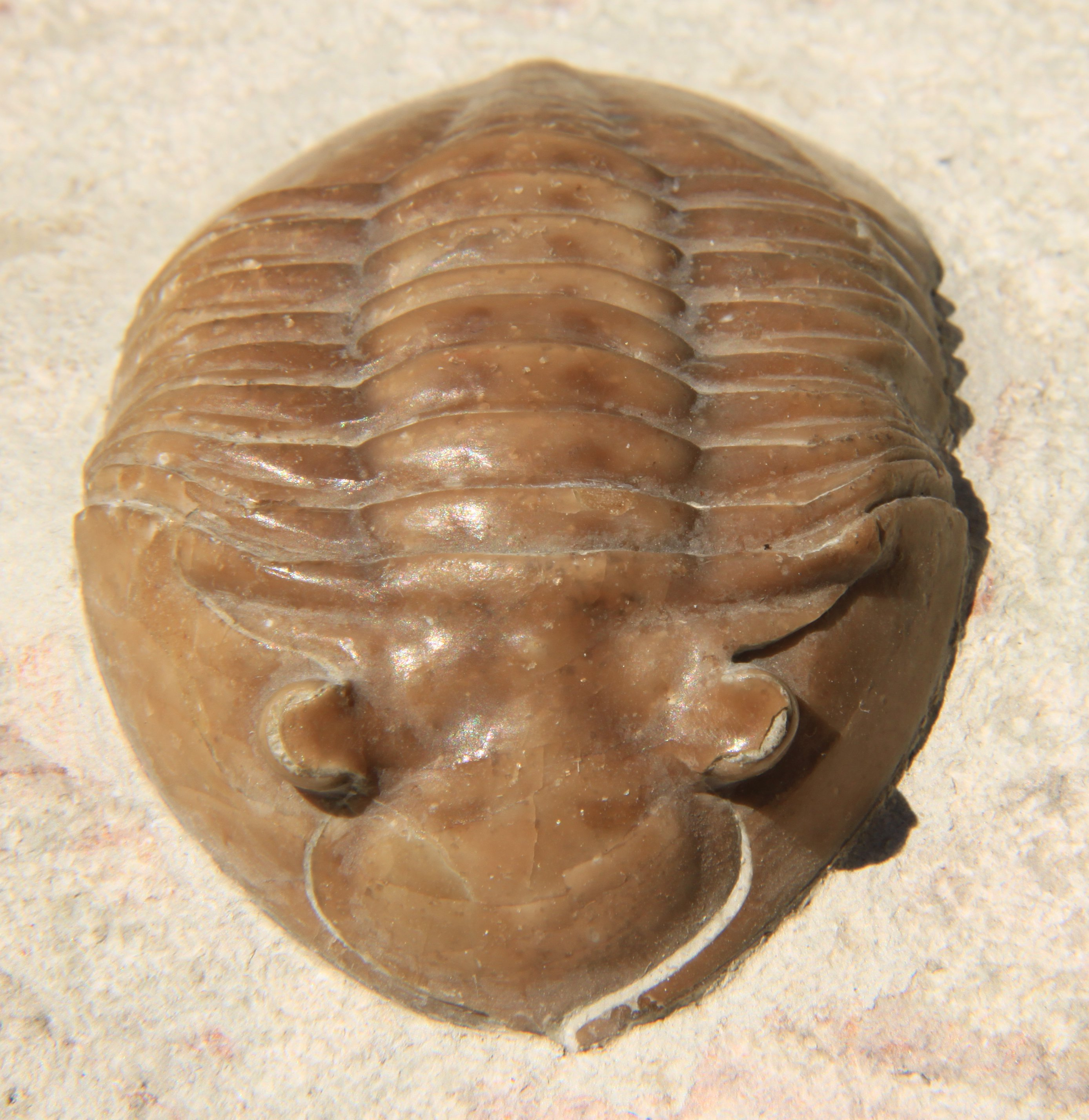
- A. latus

Scientific classification
- Kingdom: Animalia
- Phylum: Arthropoda
- Clade: †Artiopoda
- Class: †Trilobita
- Order: †Asaphida
- Family: †Asaphidae
- Genus: †Asaphus; Brongniart, 1822

Type species
- Entomostracites expansus Wahlenberg, [1818]

Species
- see text

= Asaphus =

Asaphus Temporal range: upper Floian to Darriwilian

Extinct genus of trilobites

Asaphus (/ˈæsæfʌs/) is a genus of trilobites that is known from the Lower (upper Arenig) and Middle Ordovician of northwestern Europe (Sweden, Estonia, Saint Petersburg Area).

== Etymology ==
The generic name is derived from the Greek word asaphes, meaning "indistinct."

== Description ==
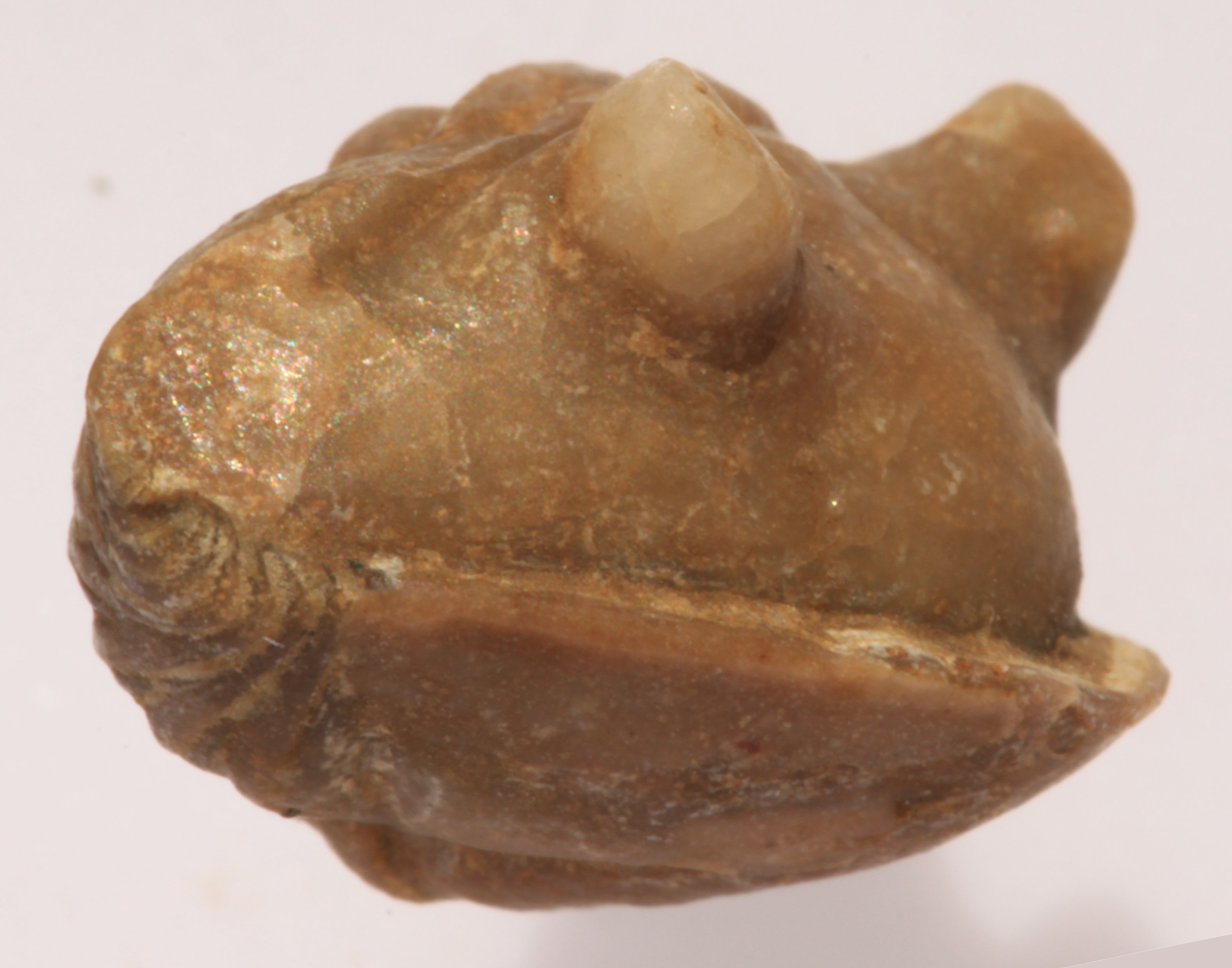
A. plautini, enrolled

The headshield (or cephalon) and tailshield (or pygidium) are semicircular and without a border (defined by a furrow or a change in convexity parallel to its margin). The cephalon is of approximately equal size as the pygidium (or isopygous).

The central raised area of the cephalon (or glabella) is long, reaching the frontal margin. It may have faint lateral glabellar furrows or be smooth, and sometimes an inconspicuous tubercle is present just in front of the hardly discernible occipital ring. The natural fracture lines (sutures) of the head run along the top edges of the compound eye. From the back of the eye these cut to the back of the head (or is said to be opisthoparian) and not to the side. The free cheeks (or librigenae) are separated from each other anteriorly by a suture at the midline. The corner between the side and the back of the cephalon (or genal angle) is rounded or (in a few species) pointed into spines. Eyes holochroal, commonly more or less conical, short or moderate in length. In some evolution lines, the visual surface of the eye is raised on a stalk.

The lateral corners of the palate (or hypostome), visual from the ventral side, are more or less protruding, and the posterior part is forked with two triangular teeth. The reflexed margin of the exoskeleton (or doublure) is broad.

The articulate midlength part of the body (or thorax) consists of 8 segments. Furrows in the parts outside the axis (or pleural furrows) are diagonal.

The pygidium is rounded, and has a long axis with concave, posteriorly parallel sides. Some rings may be faintly defined anteriorly and the axis dissolves in the postaxial field. The areas outside the axis (or pleural fields) are smooth or very faintly ribbed.

== Species ==
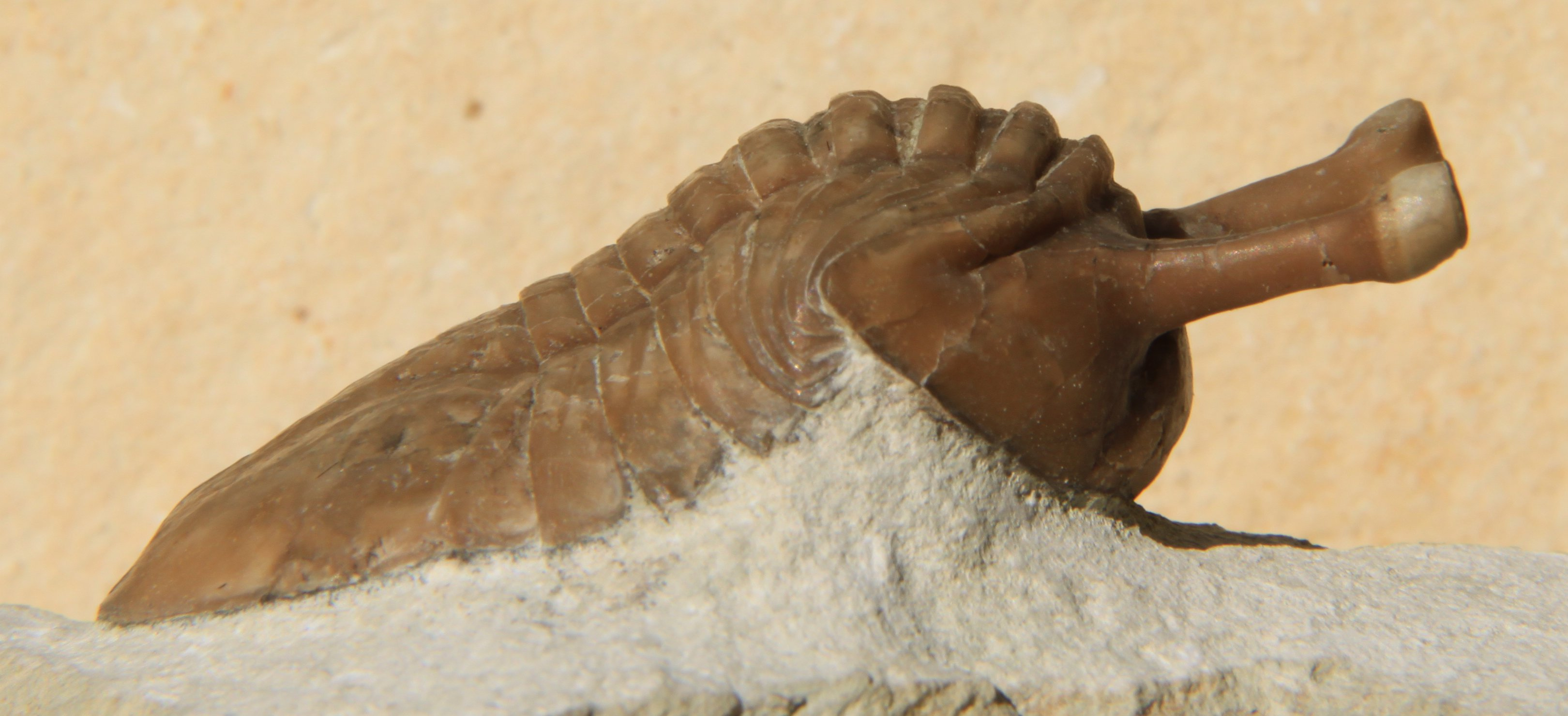
A. kowalewskii

- A. expansus (Wahlenberg, [1818]) (type species) synonyms Entomostracites expansus, Entomolithus paradoxus α expansus
- A. acuminatus Boeck, 1838
- A. bottnicus Jaanusson
- A. broeggeri Schmidt, 1898
- A. cornutus Pander, 1830
- A. eichwaldi Schmidt
- A. heckeri (Ivantsov)
- A. holmi Schmidt, 1898
- A. ingrianus Jaanusson, 1953
- A. intermedius Lessnikova in Balashova, 1953
- A. knyrkoi Schmidt
- A. kotlukovi Lessnikova in Balashova, 1953
- A. kowalewskii Lawrow, 1856
- A. latus Pander, 1830
- A. laevissimus Schmidt, 1898
- A. lepidurus Neiszkowski, 1859
- A. minor
- A. neiszkowskii Schmidt, 1898
- A. pachyophthalmus
- A. platycephalus (Stokes, 1824)
- A. plautini Schmidt, 1898
- A. punctatus Lessnikova, 1949
- A. raniceps Dalman, 1827
- A. robustus
- A. sulvevi Jaanusson
- A. vicarius (Toernquist, 1884)
- A. wahlenbergi

=== Species previously assigned to Asaphus ===
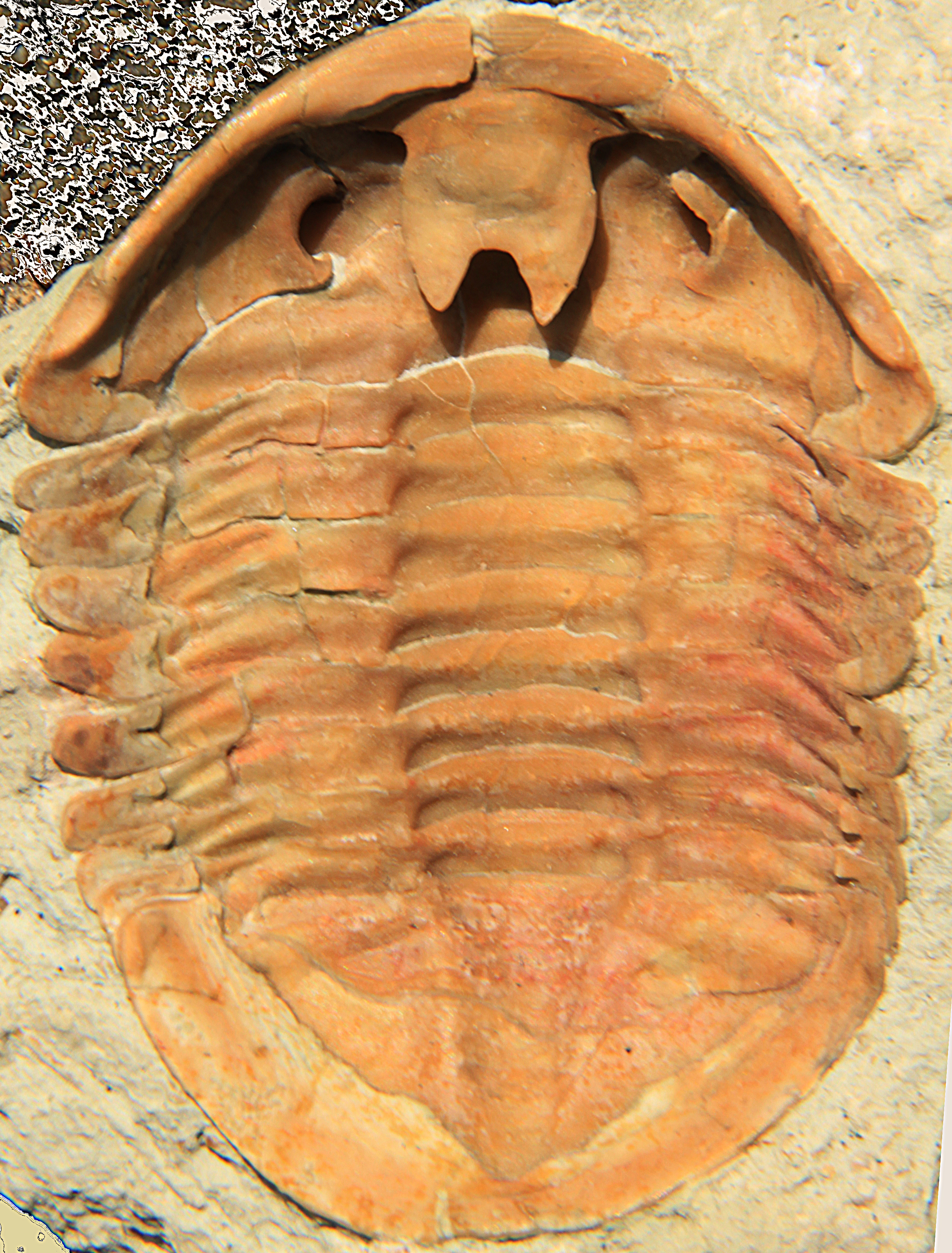
A. expansus showing the broad doublure and the forked hypostome

As the genus Asaphus was established early, many species have since been reassigned to genera in various trilobite orders.

- A. angustifrons = Ptychopyge angustifrons
- A. armadillo = Nileus armadillo
- A. aspectans = Coronura aspectans
- A. barrandei = Basilicus barrandei
- A. brongniarti = Eohomalonotus brongniarti
- A. canadensis = Pseudogygites canadensis
- A. cawdori = Acaste cawdori
- A. corndensis = Ogyginus corndensis
- A. debuchii = Ogygiocarella debuchii
- A. devexus = Xenasaphus devexus
- A. duplicatus = Platycalymene duplicatus
- A. eichwaldi = Bollandia eichwaldi
- A. extans = Bathyurus extans
- A. fischeri = Pliomera fischeri
- A. frontalis = Niobe frontalis
- A. gemmuliferus = Phillipsia gemmulifera
- A. globiceps = Bollandia globiceps
- A. granuliferus = Bollandia globiceps
- A. hausmanni = Odontochile hausmanni
- A. homfrayi = Asaphellus homfrayi
- A. latifrons = Stygina latifrons
- A. nasutus = Neoprobolium nasutus
- A. obsoletus = Bollandia obsoleta
- A. palpebrosus = Symphysurus palpebrosus
- A. plicicostis = Plectasaphus plicicostis
- A. praetextus = Ogmasaphus praetextus
- A. selenourus = Odontocephalus selenourus
- A. seminiferus = Eocyphinium seminiferum
- A. seticornis = Tretaspis seticornis
- A. stacyi = Homalopyge stacyi
- A. stokesii = Warburgella stokesii
- A. subcaudatus = Acaste subcaudata
- A. truncatulus = Phillipsia truncatula
- A. tyrannus = Basilicus tyrannus
