= Schagonaria =

Schagonaria Temporal range: earliest Middle Cambrian

Scientific classification
- Kingdom: Animalia
- Phylum: Arthropoda
- Clade: †Artiopoda
- Class: †Trilobita
- Order: †Redlichiida
- Family: †Paradoxididae
- Genus: †Schagonaria; Poletaeva, 1955

Species
- Schagonaria tannuola Poletaeva, 1955 (type species)

Genus of trilobites

Schagonaria is a genus of trilobite, an extinct group of marine arthropods. The only known species, S. tannuola occurs in the earliest Middle Cambrian of Russia (Amgaian, Ulukhema River, Tuva Region). It is related to Paradoxides, but can be distinguished from it by only a slight forward expansion of the glabella, a character shared with Anabaraceps and Primoriella. In Primoriella the front of the glabella touches the roll-like border, causing it to slightly bulge forward, in Anabaraceps there is a roll-like preglabellar field as wide as the flat border in front of it, but in Schagonaria the glabella may or may not touch the frontal border, but neither the border, nor if present the preglabellar field is particularly convex. The glabella of Schagonaria is more than twice as long as wide, and differs from Primordiella in which it is less than twice as long as wide. The articulate middle part of the body (or thorax) has 16 segments. The tailshield (or pygidium has a spatulate shape.
