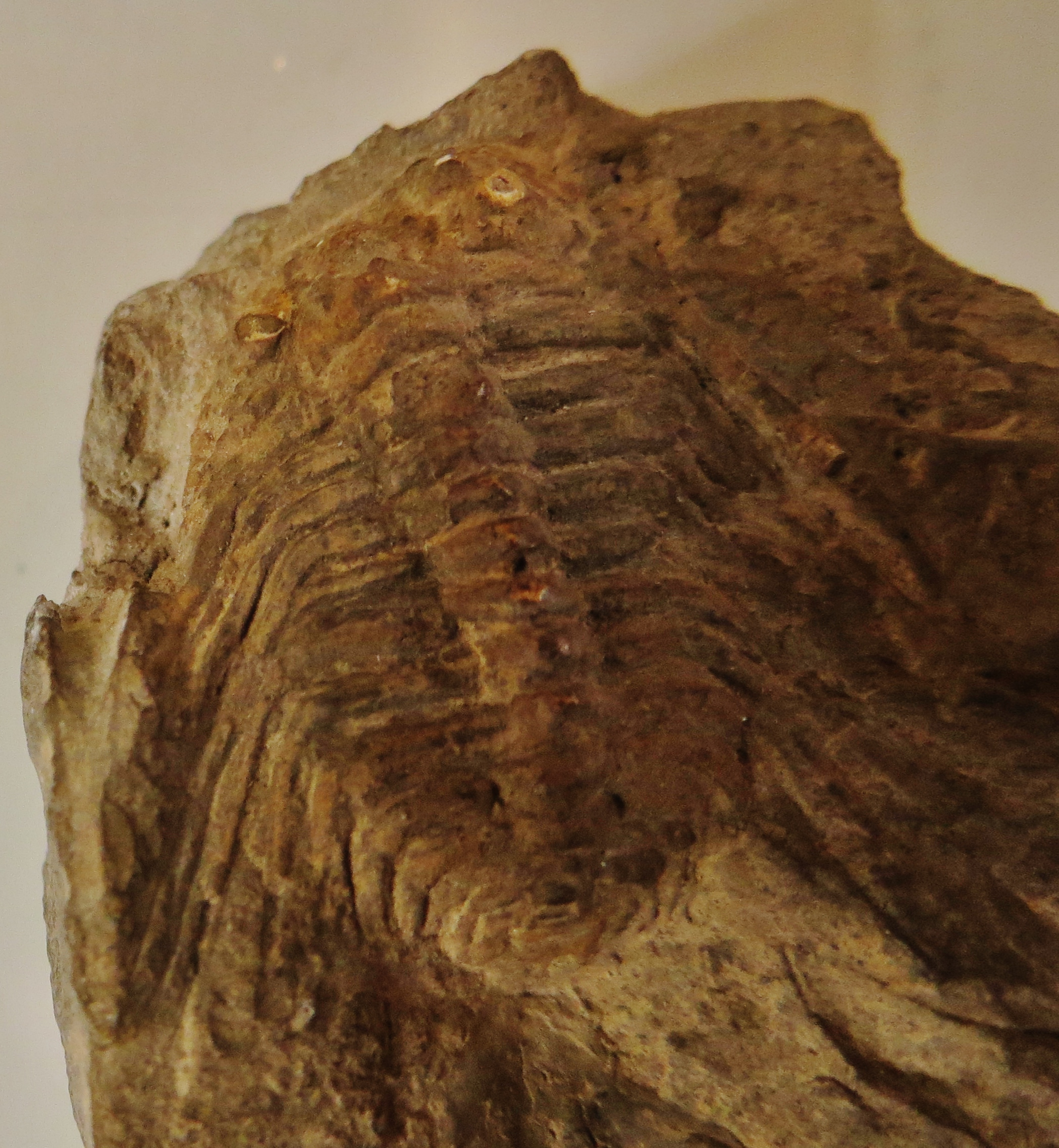
- Acidaspis elliptica

Scientific classification
- Domain: Eukaryota
- Kingdom: Animalia
- Phylum: Arthropoda
- Class: †Trilobita
- Order: †Odontopleurida
- Family: †Odontopleuridae
- Genus: †Acidaspis; Murchison, 1839

Species
- A. brightii; A. bucco; A. cincinnatiensis; A. magnospina; A. viruana; A. barrandeiFletcher & Salter, non Angelin. (P1. YIII. figs. 1-3.) 1848.

Synonyms
- Pseudomonaspis Richter & Richter, 1917

= Acidaspis =

Acidaspis Temporal range: Darriwilian to Ludlow 460.5–418.7 Ma

Extinct genus of trilobites

Acidaspis is an extinct genus of odontopleurid trilobite from the Ordovician to Silurian of North America and Europe. Although small, it had long spines along its body.

== Reassigned species ==
- Acidaspis emarginata = Anabaraspis emarginata
