= Primoriella =

Primoriella Temporal range: latest Lower Cambrian

Scientific classification
- Kingdom: Animalia
- Phylum: Arthropoda
- Clade: †Artiopoda
- Class: †Trilobita
- Order: †Redlichiida
- Family: †Paradoxididae
- Genus: †Primoriella; Repina, 1973

Species
- Primoriella bella Repina, 1973 (type species)

Genus of trilobites

Primoriella is a genus of trilobite, an extinct group of marine arthropods. The only known species, P. bella occurs in the uppermost Lower Cambrian of Russia (Redlichina culmenica beds, far eastern Siberia). It is related to Paradoxides, but can be distinguished from it by only slightly forward expansion of the (glabella) a character shared with Anabaraceps and Schagonaria. In Primoriella however, the front of the glabella touches the roll-like border, causing it to slightly bulge forward, while in Anabaraceps there is a roll-like preglabellar field as wide as the flat border in front of it. The glabella of Primordiella is less than twice as long as wide, and differs from Schagonaria in which it is more than twice as long as wide. The thorax and pygidium are not known.
