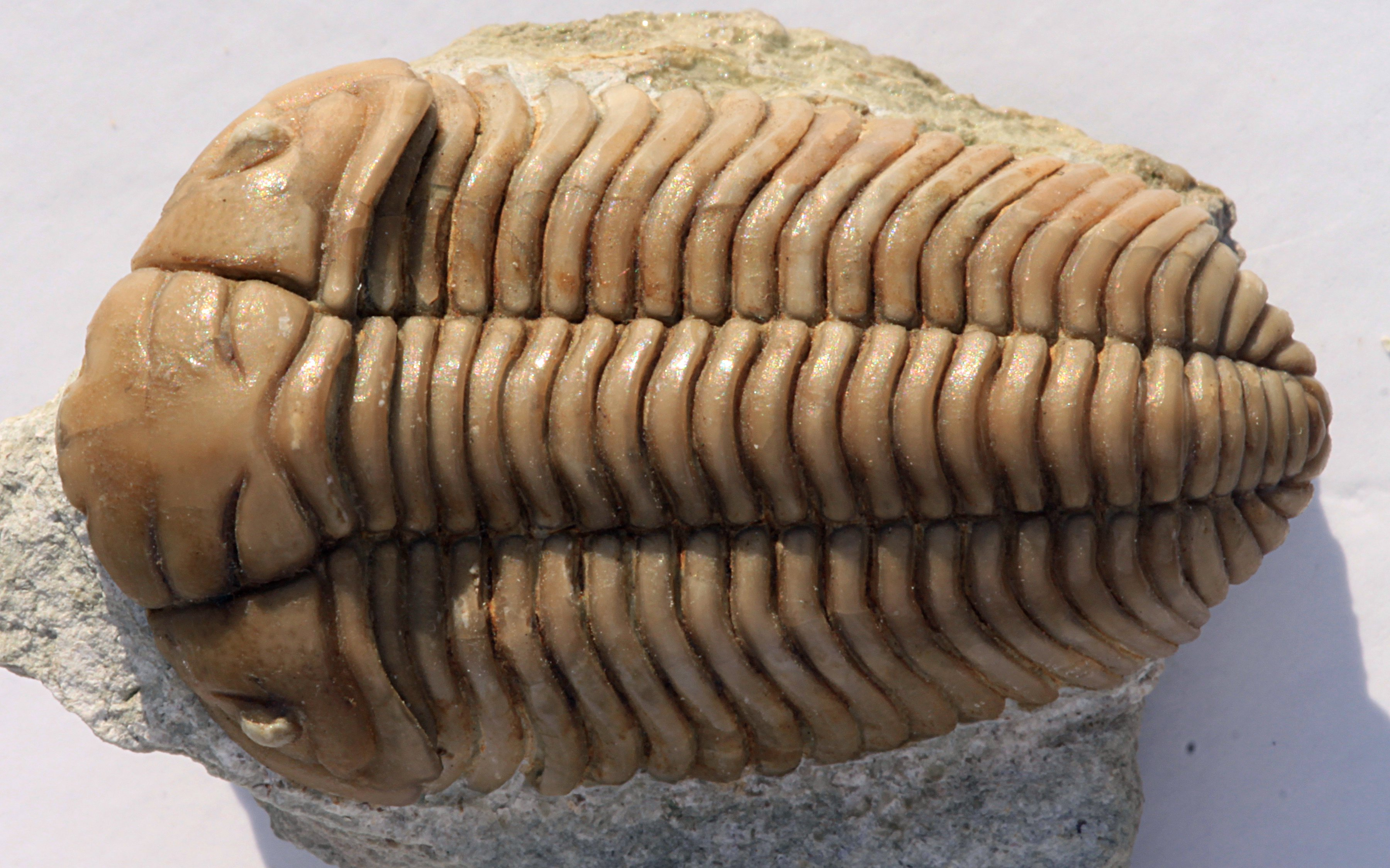
- Pliomera fischeri

Scientific classification
- Domain: Eukaryota
- Kingdom: Animalia
- Phylum: Arthropoda
- Class: †Trilobita
- Order: †Phacopida
- Family: †Pliomeridae
- Genus: †Pliomera; Angelin, 1852

Species
- P. fischeri (Eichwald, 1825) (type species) synonyms Asaphus fischeri, Calymene polytoma, C. frontiloba; P. fischeri fischeri; P. fischeri asiatica Chugaeva, 1964; P. anderkensis Weber, 1948; P. brevicapitata (Lamansky, 1903); P. iliensis Koroleva, 1959; P. ingsanigensis Reed, 1906; P. mathesii Angelin, 1854; P. pseudoarticulata Reed, 1910; P. tmetophrys Harrington & Leanza, 1957

Synonyms
- Amphion Pander, 1830, non Amphion Hubner, 1816 (the Nessus sphinx, a hawkmoth)

= Pliomera =

Pliomera Temporal range: Middle Ordovician

Extinct genus of trilobites

Pliomera is a genus of trilobites that lived during the Middle Ordovician on the paleocontinent Baltica, now Norway, Sweden, Estonia and the Russian Federation, and in Argentina. It can be recognized for its pentagonal glabella widest between the frontal corners, with an inverted V-shaped occipital ring. In front of the occipital furrow that crosses the entire glabella, two pairs of dead-ending furrows create three side lobes left and right. The front of the glabella also has three dead-ending furrows, a very short one on the midline and left and right a longer one, directed inward and slightly backward. The eyes are small and are not connected to the glabella by an eye ridge. The thorax and pygidium are very regularly divided into up to 23 rather narrow segments, without a furrow within each of the pleurae. The pleurae are clearly wider than the axis. The pygidium ends in downward pointing toothlike spines.

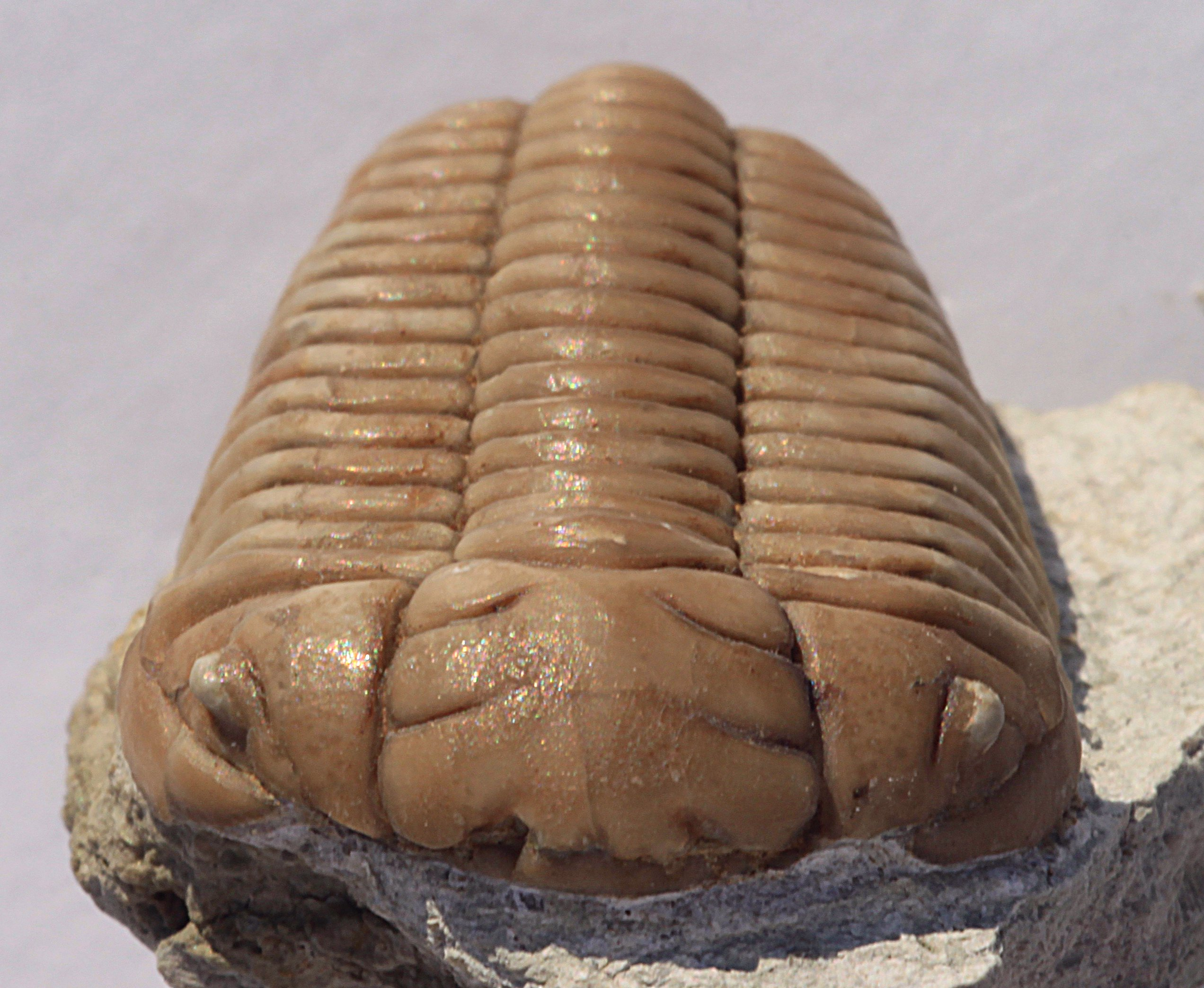
Glabella of Pliomera fischeri

== Taxonomy ==
Species previously assigned to Pliomera are:

- P. insangensis = Encrinurella insangensis
- P. insolita = Kanoshia insolita
- P. linnarssoni = Pliomerops linnarssoni
- P. martelli = Pliomerina martelli
- P. sulcifrons = Pliomerina sulcifrons

== Distribution ==
- P. brevicapitata occurs in the Middle Ordovician of the Russian Federation (Volkov Stage, Darriwillian, St. Petersburg region).
- P. fischeri is known from the Middle Ordovician of the Russian Federation (Kunda Stage Darriwillian, St. Petersburg region).

== Description ==
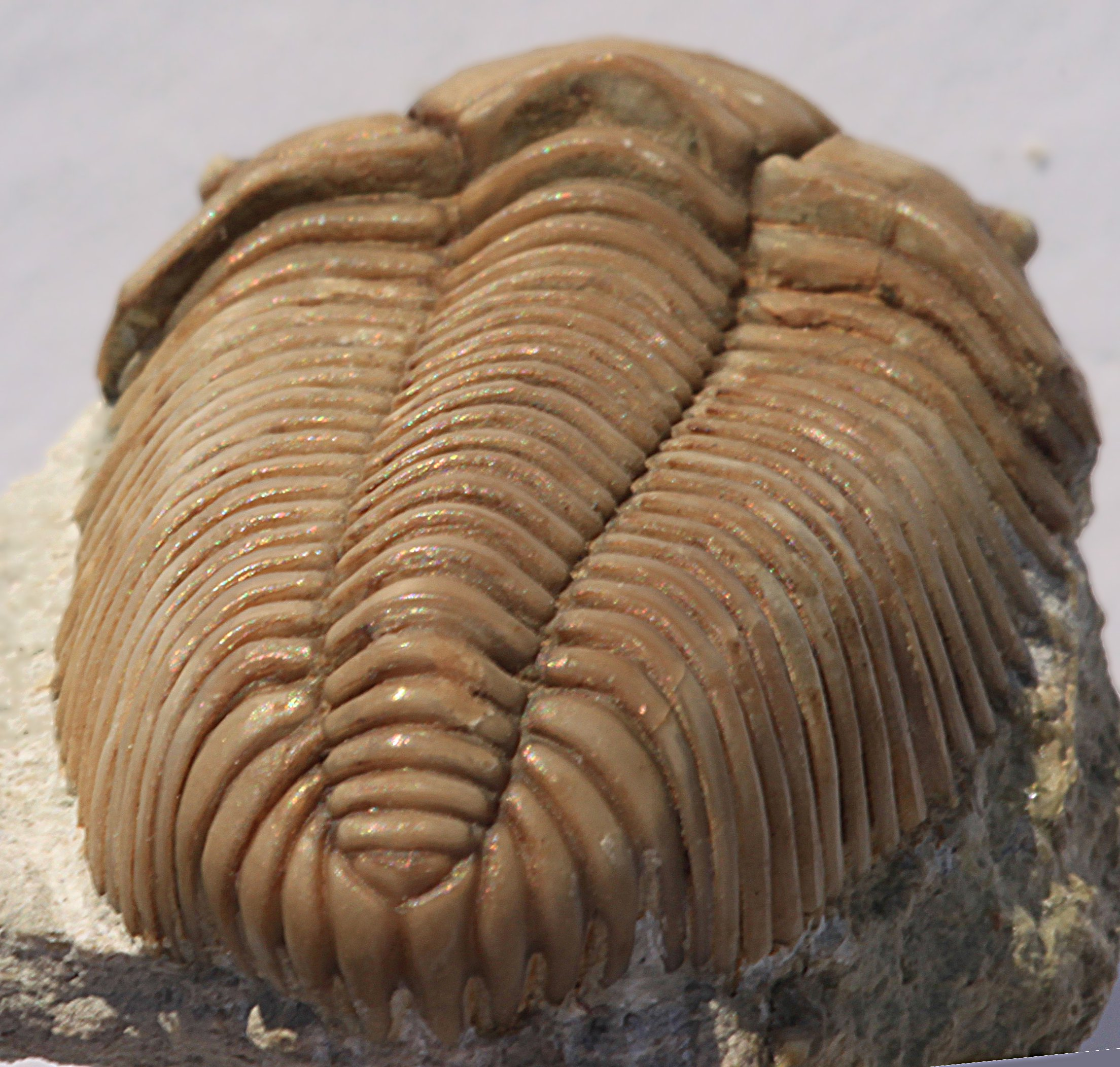
The tooth-like pygidial spines

Pliomera has a pentagonal glabella (the central area of the head shield) that is widest between the frontal corners, and has an inverted V-shaped occipital ring. In front of the occipital furrow that crosses the entire glabella, two pairs of dead-ending furrows, create three side lobes left and right. The front of the glabella also has three dead-ending furrows, a very short one on the midline and left and right a longer one, directed inward and slightly backward. A very efficient fastening device is unique in Pliomera. It consists of a row of 7 to 9 downward directed denticles along the front of the glabella, which interlocked with corresponding teeth on the pygidium, when the animal protected itself by enrolling. The eyes are small and raised above the cheeks but not connected to the glabella by an eye ridge. The facial sutures in genus Pliomera itself are gonatoparian, while in the genus Placoparia these are opisthoparian, and this is unlike all other pliomerids where facial sutures are proparian. The thorax may have between 12 and 18 segments. The pygidium has 4 or 5 axial rings and small termination. The corresponding pleural segments are very well defined and end in tooth-like points, the last pair of which is completely embracing the small terminal axial segment.
