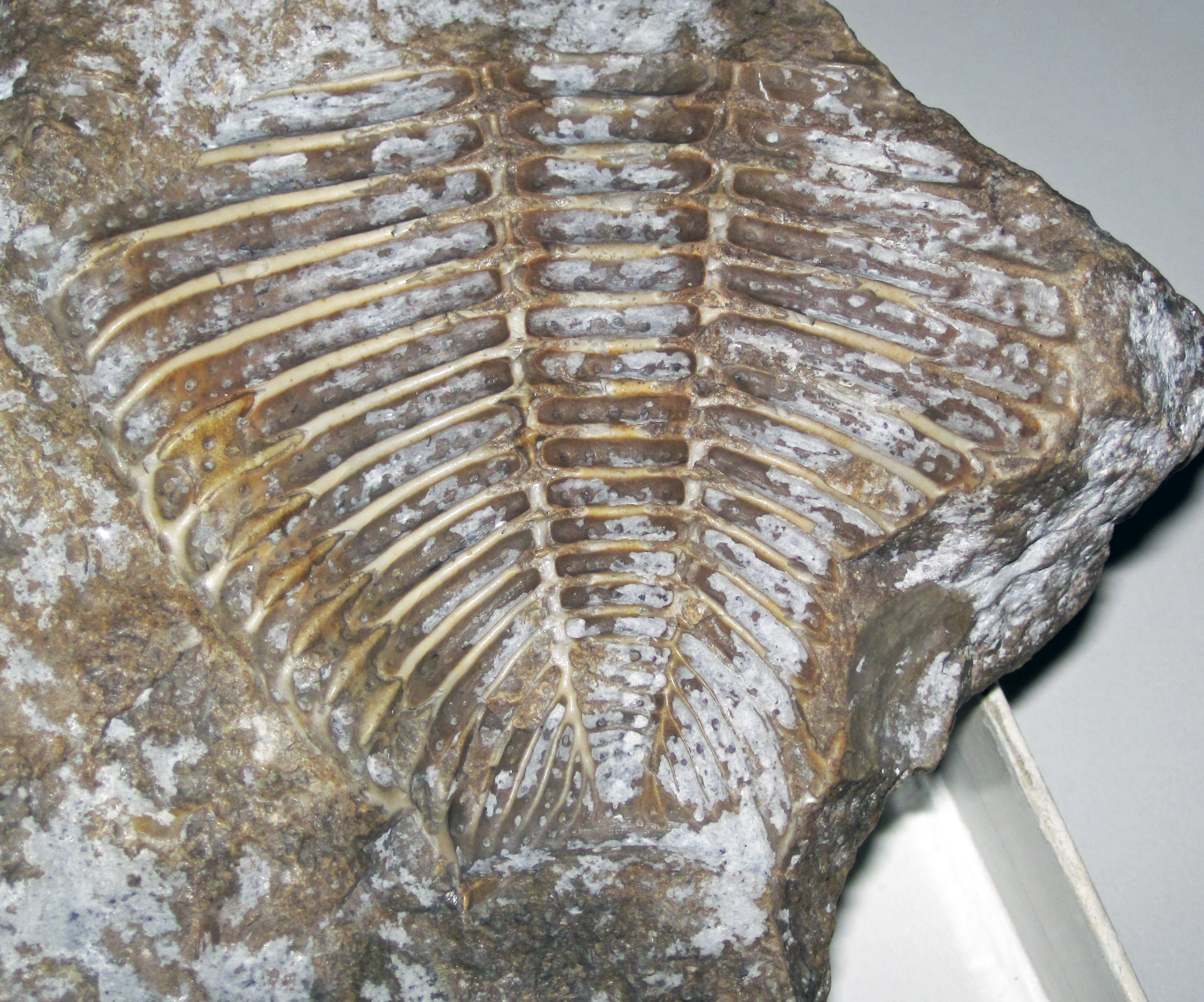
- Coronura aspectans

Scientific classification
- Domain: Eukaryota
- Kingdom: Animalia
- Phylum: Arthropoda
- Class: †Trilobita
- Order: †Phacopida
- Family: †Dalmanitidae
- Genus: †Coronura; Hall & Clarke, 1888

Type species
- Coronura aspectans

Species
- Coronura aspectans; Coronura lessepsensis

= Coronura =

Coronura Temporal range: Mid Devonian ~392–383 Ma

Genus of trilobites

Coronura is a trilobite in the order Phacopida, that existed during the Middle Devonian in what is now New York, U.S.A. It was described by Hall and Clarke in 1888, and the type species is Coronura aspectans, which was originally described under the genus Asaphus by Conrad in 1841. The species was described from the Onondaga Formation. Fossils of Coronura have also been found in Indiana, and in the Emsian to Givetian Floresta Formation, Altiplano Cundiboyacense, Colombia.
