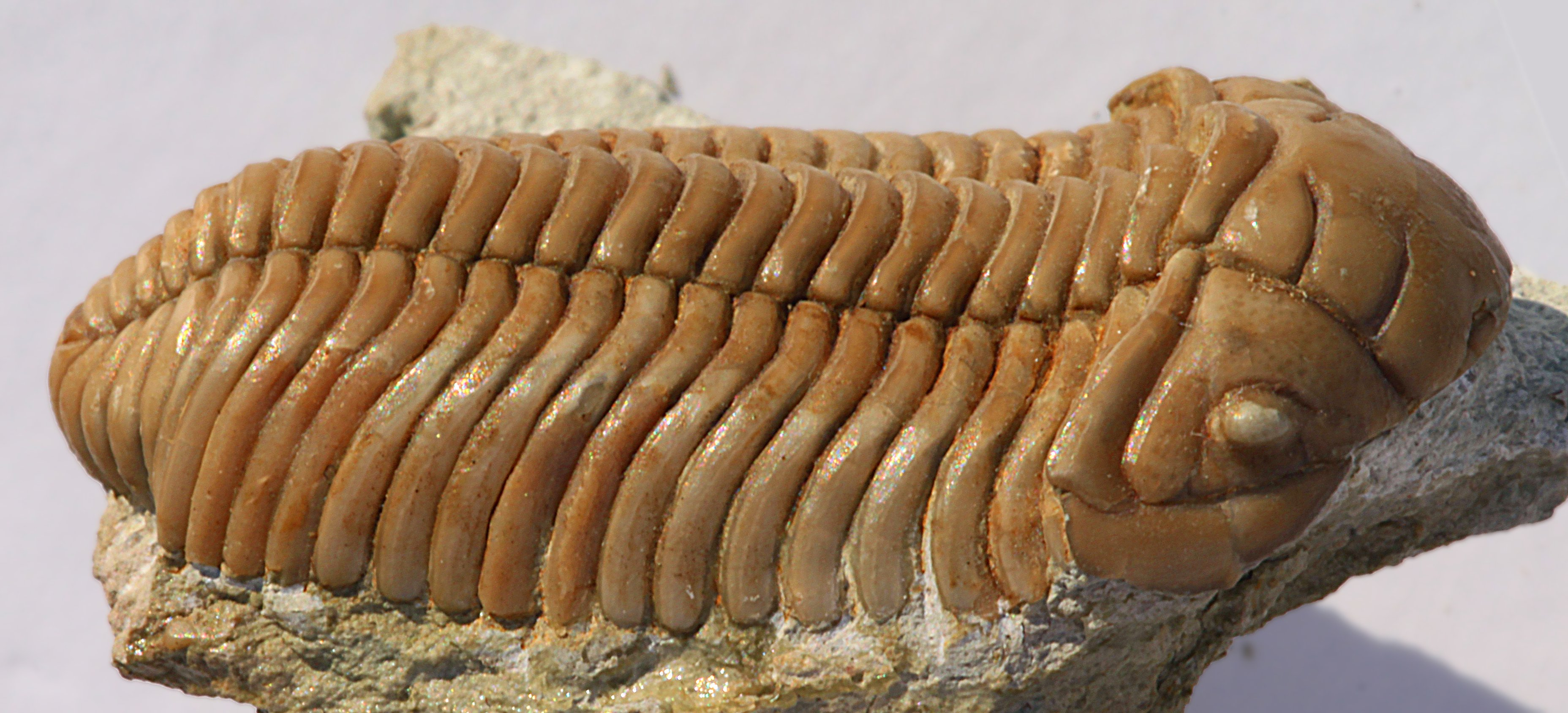
- Pliomera fischeri

Scientific classification
- Kingdom: Animalia
- Phylum: Arthropoda
- Clade: †Artiopoda
- Class: †Trilobita
- Order: †Phacopida
- Suborder: †Cheirurina
- Family: †Pliomeridae; Raymond, 1913

= Pliomeridae =

Pliomeridae Temporal range: Ordovician, 478.6–445.6 Ma

Extinct family of trilobites

Pliomeridae is a family of phacopide trilobites, containing the following genera:

- Anapliomera
- Benedettia
- Canningella
- Colobinion
- Coplacoparia
- Cybelopsis
- Ectenonotus
- Encrinurella
- Evropeites
- Gogoella
- Guizhoupliomerops
- Hawleia
- Hintzeia
- Humaencrinuroides
- Ibexaspis
- Josephulus
- Kanoshia
- Leiostrototropis
- Liexiaspis
- Ngaricephalus
- Obliteraspis
- Ovalocephalus
- Parahawleia
- Parapliomera
- Perissopliomera
- Placoparia
- Pliomera
- Pliomerella
- Pliomeridius
- Pliomerina
- Pliomerops
- Protoencrinurella
- Protopliomerella
- Protopliomerops
- Pseudocybele
- Pseudomera
- Quinquecosta
- Rossaspis
- Strotactinus
- Tesselacauda
- Tienshihfuia
- Tzuchiatocnemis
