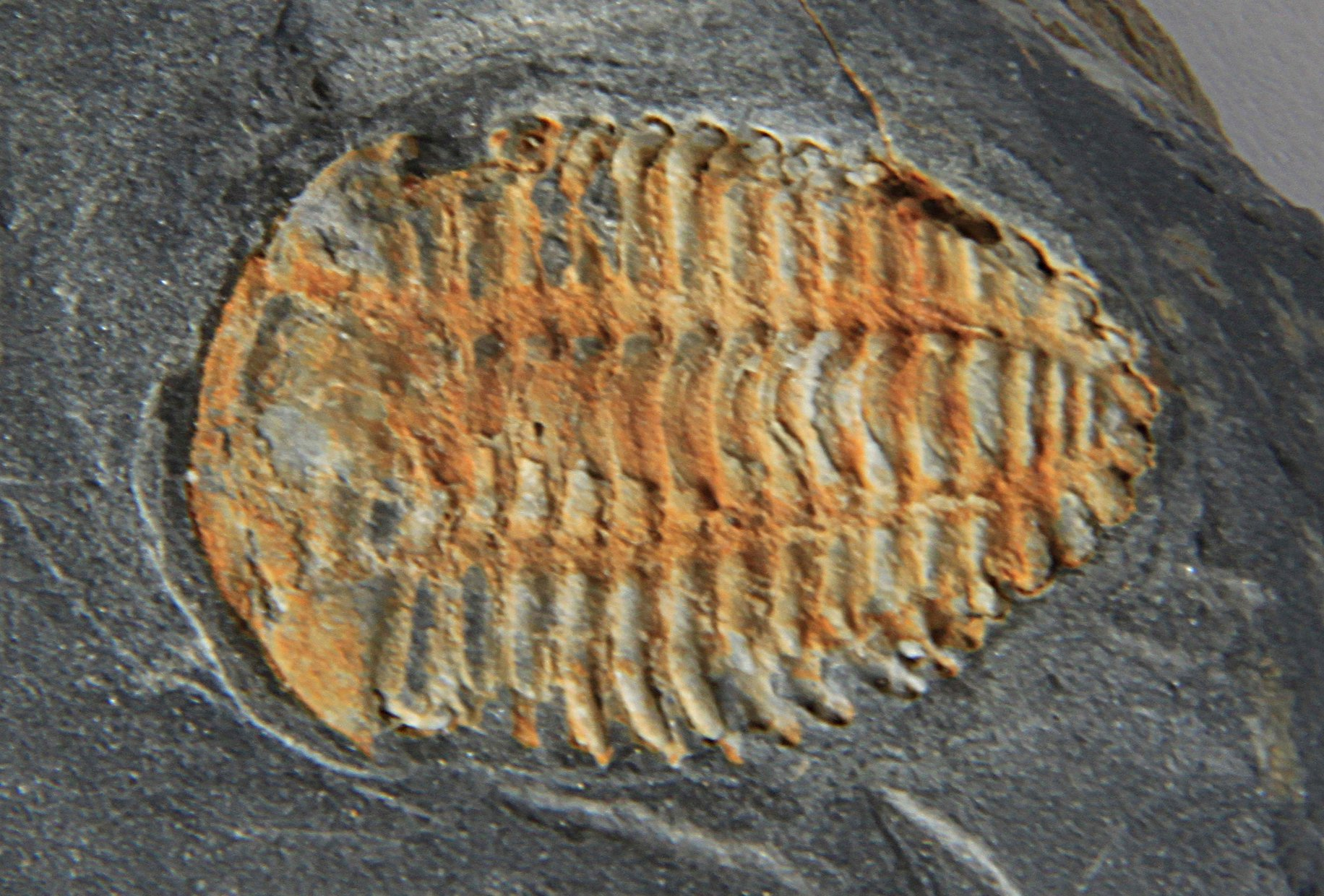
- Placoparia tournemini, 28mm

Scientific classification
- Domain: Eukaryota
- Kingdom: Animalia
- Phylum: Arthropoda
- Class: †Trilobita
- Order: †Phacopida
- Family: †Pliomeridae
- Genus: †Placoparia; Hawle & Corda, 1847

Species
- P. zippei (Boeck, 1828) (type species) synonym Trilobites zippei; P. borni Hammann, 1971; P. cambriensis Hicks, 1875; P. tournemini (Rouault, 1847) synonym Calymene tournemini

= Placoparia =

Placoparia Temporal range: Floian to Sandbian

Genus of trilobites

Placoparia is a genus of trilobites of average size (up to 6 cm) that lived during the late Lower to the early Upper Ordovician on the paleocontinents Gondwana, Avalonia and Laurentia, now the Czech Republic, France, Germany, Morocco, Portugal, Spain and Wales. Its headshield (or cephalon) is semi-circular to rectangular with rounded frontal corners. It lacks eyes, but eye ridges are present. The fact that the facial sutures are opisthoparian (with sutures in Pliomera gonatoparian) is an exception in the otherwise proparian Cheirurina. The thorax has 11 or 12 segments, with the axis slightly wider than the ribs (or pleurae) to its sides. The tips of the pleurae are free, which resembles an old-fashion central heating radiator. The axis in the small tailshield (or pygidium) consists of four rings and a minute endpiece. The four pleurae end in spatulate spines that fit to corresponding indentations in the cephalon.

== Distribution ==
- P. borni has been found in the Middle Ordovician of the Czech Republic, France, Spain and Portugal (Llandeilo, Dobrotivian).
- P. cambriensis is known from the Lower Ordovician of Morocco (Arenig), Wales (Upper Arenig and lower Llarvirn), and the Lower and Middle Ordovician of Spain, Portugal, France and the Czech Republic (Llarvirn).
- P. tournemini is present in the Middle Ordovician of Spain, Portugal and France (Llandeilo, Dobrotivian).
- P. zippei occurs in the Middle Ordovician of the Czech Republic (Llandeilo, Dobrotivian) and Morocco (Llandeilo), and a comparable form in Germany (Llarvirn).

== Description ==
The lateral borders of the free cheeks (or librigenae) of bear indentations that fit the tips of the pleurae of the thorax and the first pair of pygidial pleurae and these could effectively lock the uncalcified underside of the animal during enrollment. This mechanism is comparable the situation in Pliomera. Remains of the alimentary tract containing coarse sediment, and of a multisegmented antenna have been found in Placoparia.
