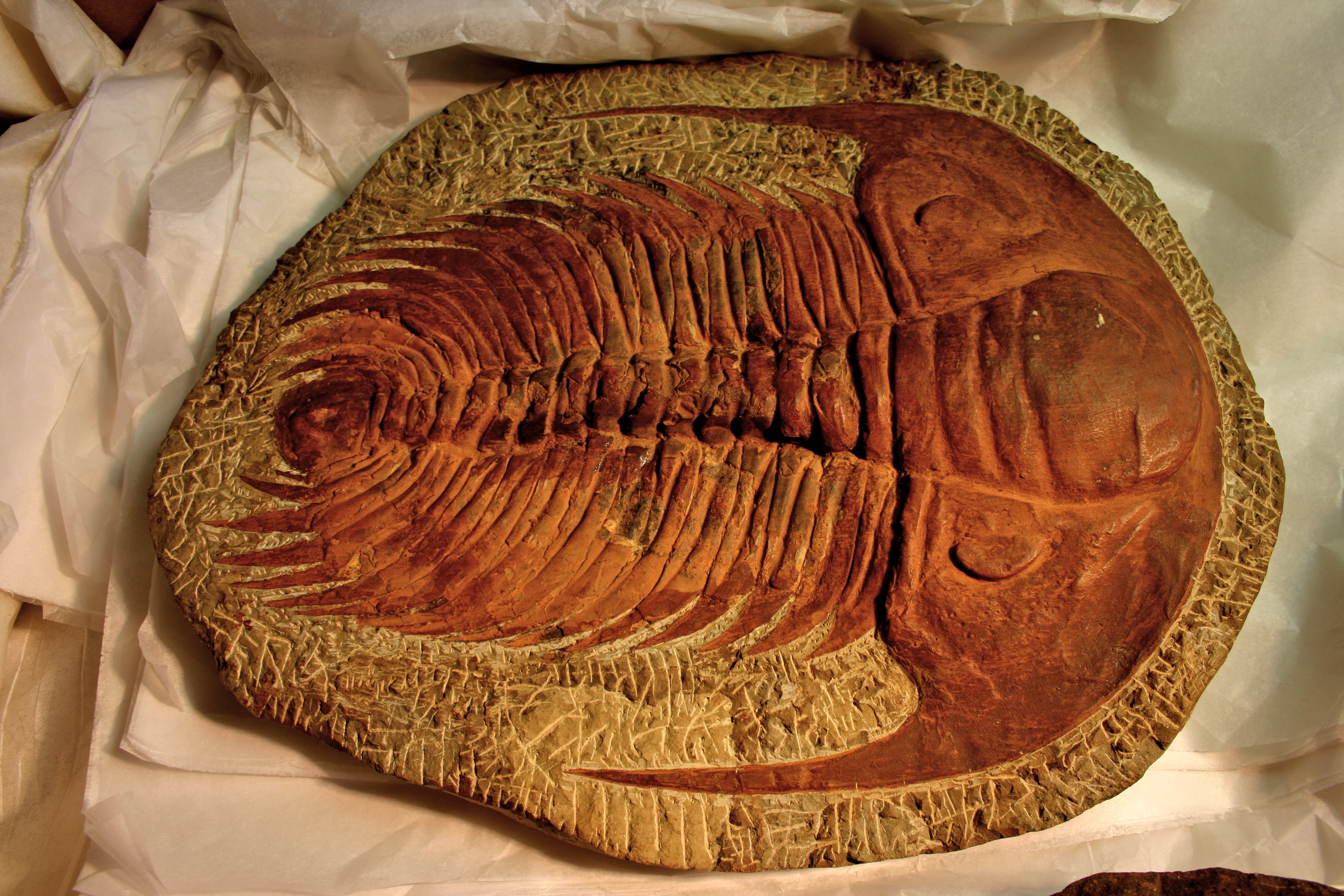
- Paradoxides

Scientific classification
- Kingdom: Animalia
- Phylum: Arthropoda
- Clade: †Artiopoda
- Class: †Trilobita
- Order: †Redlichiida
- Superfamily: †Paradoxidoidea
- Family: †Paradoxididae; Hawle & Corda, 1847

Genera
- Acadoparadoxides; Anabaraceps; Anabaraspis; Bajanaspis; Baltoparadoxides; Hydrocephalus; Paradoxides; Phanoptes; Plutonides; Primoriella; Schagonaria; Schoriina

= Paradoxididae =

Paradoxididae Temporal range: upper Lower Cambrian–Middle Cambrian

Extinct family of trilobites

The Paradoxididae are a family of trilobites, a group of extinct marine arthropods. They occurred during the late Lower Cambrian (Toyonian) and disappeared at the end of the Middle Cambrian. Representatives of this family have been found in the paleocontinents of Avalonia, Baltica, and Gondwana, now Canada (Nova-Scotia, New Brunswick, Newfoundland), USA (Massachusetts, South Carolina), England, Wales, Morocco, Spain, Czech Republic, Poland, Russia (Novaya Zemlya, Northern Siberia, North-East Yakutia), Mongolia, and Turkey. Species in this family can typically grow large to very large (over 30 cm), are relatively flat, have an inverted egg-shaped outline, opisthoparian sutures, a glabella that in early genera has parallel sides and expands forward in later representatives, and approaches or reaches the frontal border. All species have an almost semicircular headshield (or cephalon) with long backward-directed genal spines. The articulate middle part of the body (or thorax) consists of 15 to 21 segments ending in sickle-shaped spines that to the back curve increasingly further backwards. The tailshield (or pygidium) is small.
