= Trilobites (genus) =

Trilobites Link, 1807 is a disused genus of trilobites, the species of which are now all assigned to other genera.

- T. alatus = Sphaerophthalmus alatus
- T. desideratus = Paradoxides gracilis
- T. elliptifrons = Acernaspis elliptifrons
- T. emarginata = Isoctomesa emarginata
- T. hoffi = Ellipsocephalus hoffi
- T. limbatus = Megistaspis limbatus
- T. mimulus = Tomoligus mimulus
- T. minor = Hydrocephalus minor
- T. mutilus = Carmon mutilus
- T. orphana = Orphanaspis orphana
- T. serratus = Apatokephalus serratus
- T. sulzeri = Conocoryphe sulzeri
- T. zippei = Placoparia zippei
