= Pliomeridius =

Pliomeridius Temporal range: Early Ordovician–Middle Ordovician

Scientific classification
- Domain: Eukaryota
- Kingdom: Animalia
- Phylum: Arthropoda
- Class: †Trilobita
- Order: †Phacopida
- Family: †Pliomeridae
- Genus: †Pliomeridius; Leanza & Baldis, 1975

Extinct genus of trilobites

Pliomeridius is an extinct genus of trilobite in the family Pliomeridae.
