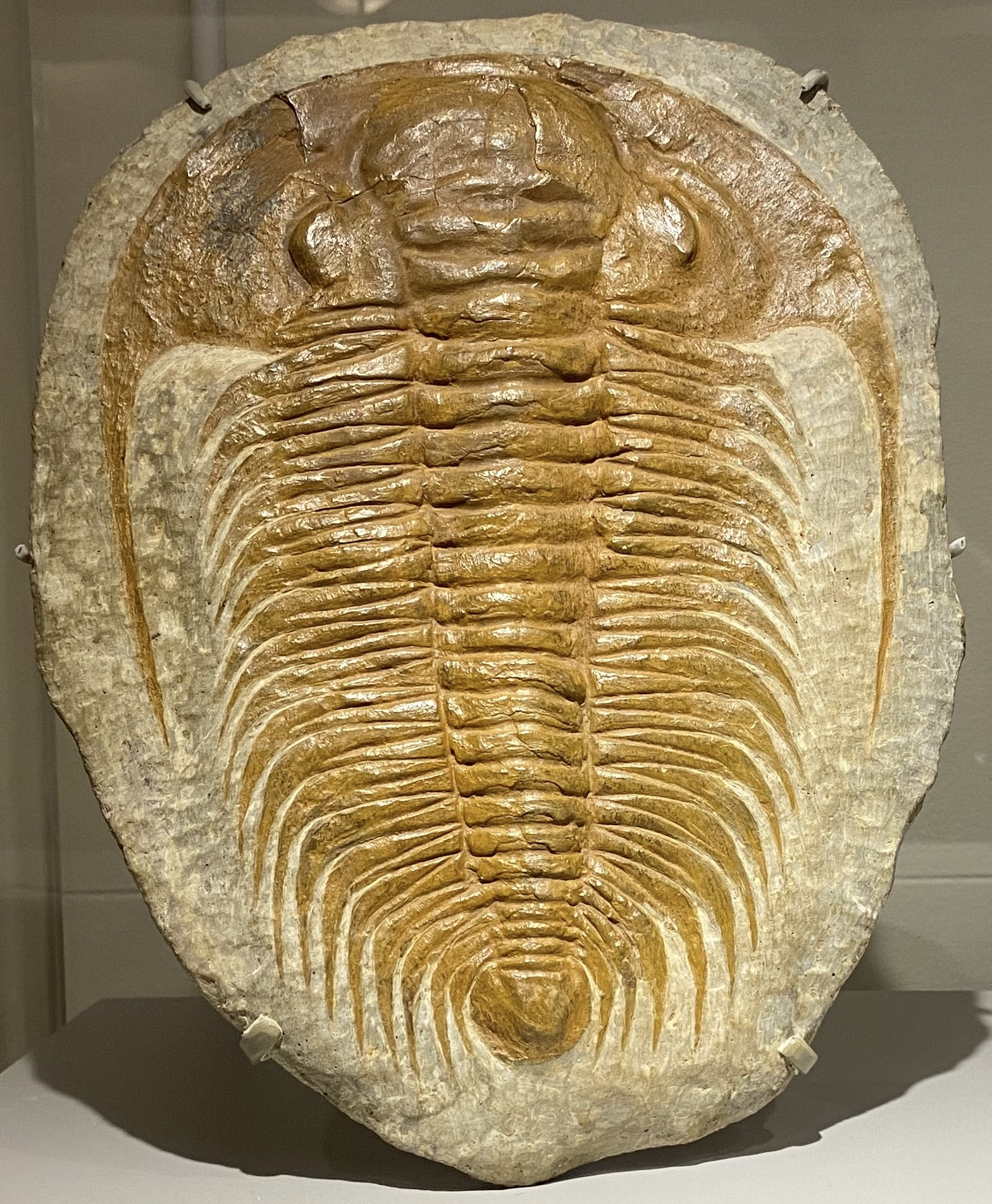
- Paradoxides gracilis fossil at the American Museum of Natural History

Scientific classification
- Kingdom: Animalia
- Phylum: Arthropoda
- Clade: †Artiopoda
- Class: †Trilobita
- Order: †Redlichiida
- Family: †Paradoxididae
- Genus: †Paradoxides; Brongniart, 1822

Species
- P. paradoxissimus (Wahlenberg, 1818) (type species) synonym Entomostracites paradoxissimus; P. carens(Barrande, 1846); P. davidis Salter, 1863; P. davidis davidis Salter, 1863; P. davidis intermedius Bergström & Levi-Setti 1978; P. davidis trapezopyge Bergström & Levi-Setti 1978; P. gracilis (Boeck, 1827) = Trilobites desideratus, Vinicella desideratus; P. brachyrhachis Linnarsson, 1883; P. bidentatus Westergård, 1936; P. quadrimucronatus Holm MS. in Westergard, 1936; P. briareus Geyer, 1993; P. forchhammeri Angelin, 1854; P. grandoculus McMenamin & Weaver, 2004; P. haywardi Raymond, 1914; P. hicksii Salter, 1865; P. knizeki (Kordule, 1990); P. mandiki (Kordule, 1990); P. minor (Boeck, 1827); P. opanol (Šnajdr, 1978); P. rohanovicus (Šnajdr, 1986); P. rugulosus Corda, 1847; P. sirokyi (Šnajdr, 1986); P. walcotti Shaler & Foerste, 1888

Synonyms
- Entomostracites; Vinicella

= Paradoxides =

Paradoxides Temporal range: Middle Cambrian ~514–497 Ma

Extinct genus of trilobites

Paradoxides is a genus of large to very large trilobite found throughout the world during the Middle Cambrian period. One record-breaking specimen of Paradoxides davidis, described by John William Salter in 1863, is 37 cm (15 in). The cephalon was semicircular with free cheeks ending in long, narrow, recurved spines. Eyes were crescent shaped providing an almost 360° view, but only in the horizontal plane. Its elongate thorax was composed of 19–21 segments and adorned with longish, recurved pleural spines. Its pygidium was comparatively small. Paradoxides is a characteristic Middle-Cambrian trilobite of the 'Atlantic' (Avalonian) fauna. Avalonian rocks were deposited near a small continent called Avalonia in the Paleozoic Iapetus Ocean. Avalonian beds are now in a narrow strip along the East Coast of North America, and in Europe.

== Description ==
The exoskeleton of Paradoxides is large to very large, relatively flat, and about one and a half times longer than wide, with greatest width across the genal spines. The cephalon is close to semicircular with long genal spines developed from the posterolateral corners of the cephalon. Depending on species the facial sutures are of variable length behind the palpebral lobes. The preocular sections of the facial suture follows a slight S-curve and intersect the anterior cephalic margin in front of the eye. Four pairs of glabellar furrows are usually present, the posterior two pairs (1p and 2p) are transglabellar. 3p and 4p furrows short with 4p commonly directed forwards and outwards to intersect axial furrows opposite maximum glabellar width. Palpebral lobes are short and of variable length. Hypostoma in some species is fused with the rostral plate, e.g. in Paradoxides davidis, a character that distinguishes the genus from all other trilobites, except in some Cambrian Corynexochida such as Oryctocephalus and Fieldaspis.

Thorax consists of 19–21 segments; axis about as wide as each of the pleurae, excluding pleural spines which curve backwards and slightly increase in length towards posterior. Spines on rear thoracic segment twice as long, often more, than associated pleurae and extending well beyond the pygidium.

Pygidium is small with one or two axial rings and may be partially or completely fused to the last thoracic segment. The axis does not reach the rear margin of the pygidium and defines a U-shaped pleural field.

== Ontogeny ==
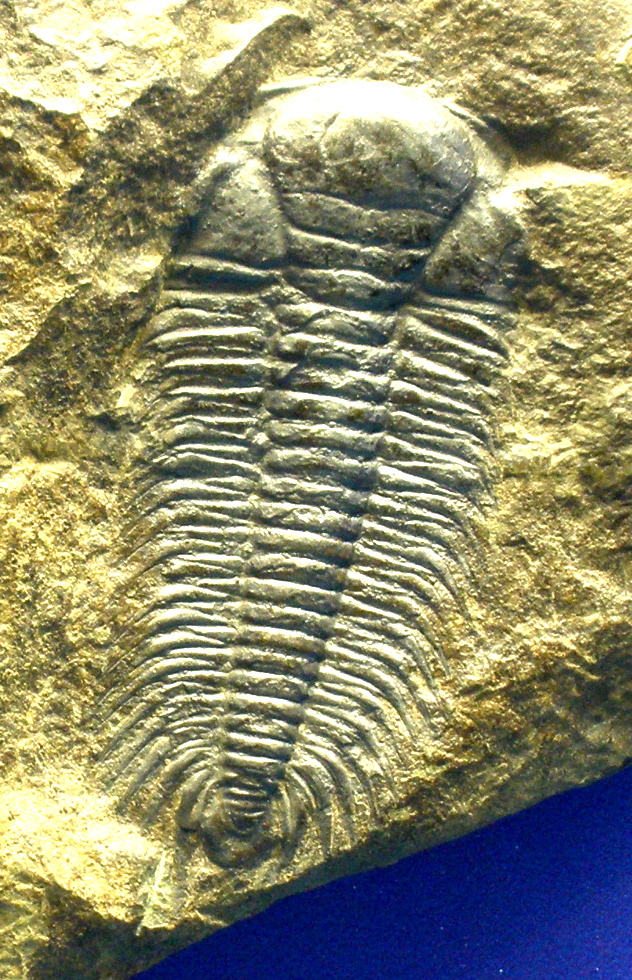
Paradoxides gracilis, lacking the free cheeks and with the spines on the most backward thoracic segment broken off

The larval development (or ontogeny) of Paradoxides was already described by Barrande (in 1852). The earliest stage (protaspis) is a disc with three pairs of spines on the margin. Genal spines are placed at half-length and directed at about 45° outward and backward, curving slightly further backwards and almost a third of the diameter of the protaspis long. Sharply pointed intergenal spines, about 50% of the disc diameter long, are positioned at the back of the future cephalon, are straight and pointing backwards and 15° outward. These spines will have disappeared in adult specimens. The first of future thoracic spines are placed immediately next to the intergenal spines and curve to a parallel with the midline. The front of the glabella almost reaches the front and consists of four sets of lobes divided by a furrow on the midline in the frontal two-thirds, and furrows between them. The most backward set consisting of two central and two lateral lobes. Further backwards is the final element of the glabella, one central occipital lobe that carries a small node, and two lateral occipital lobes. The axis is terminated with three rings of somewhat decreasing width. Midlength of the side of the most glabellar lobes run semicircular eyelobes parallel to the margin of the exoskeleton, ending near the base of the intergenal spine

== Behaviour ==
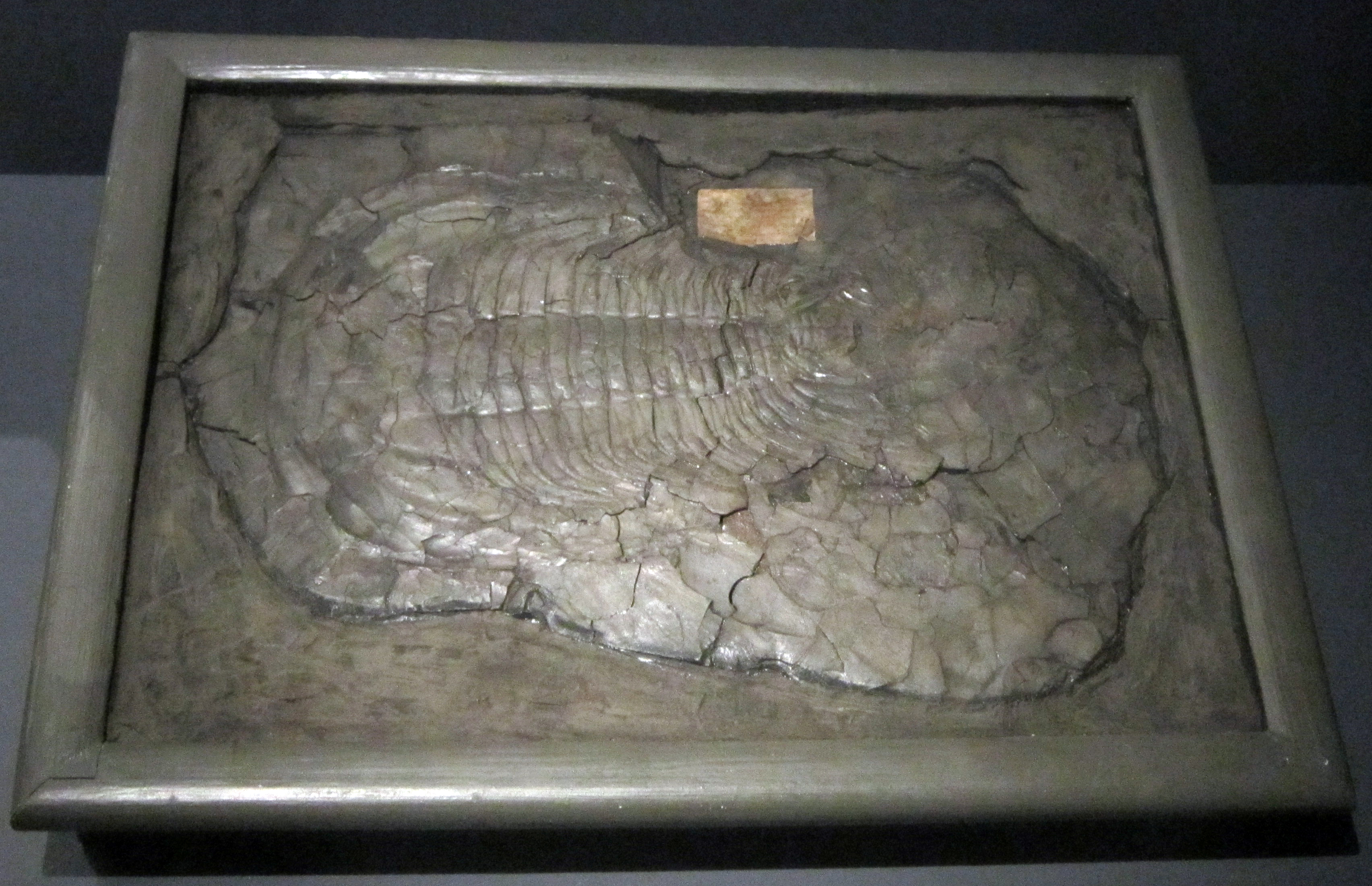
This P. paradoxissimus specimen at the Copenhagen Zoological Museum was described by Carl Linnaeus

Like in many early trilobites, the thorax of Paradoxides consists of so-called nonfulcrate segments, that allow the animal to roll, providing protection from front, rear, top, and bottom, while leaving access to the soft ventral side of the animal from each of the sides.

Complete specimens of Paradoxides have been found with the librigenae and fused rostral-hypostomal plate. In moulting, the body was arched above the substrate, with the anterior border at the front and posterior pleural spines dug into sediment. Stretching the body would then result in rupturing the sutures in the cephalon and flipping off the librigenae including the rostral-hypostomal plate. After moulting the animal would exit moving forward from its old exoskeleton.

Specimens of Paradoxides have been found containing intact Peronopsis trilobites between glabella and hypostome and where the gut would have been, and these are assumed to have not been food items of the large trilobite, but instead either scavenged on its digestive track, or found shelter.

== Reassigned species ==
A number of species previously assigned to the genus Paradoxides have since been transferred to other genera:

- P. armatus = Metadoxides armatus
- P. boltoni = Arctinurus boltoni
- P. carolinaensis = Pteridinium
- P. expectans = Luhops expectans
- P. loveni = Centropleura loveni
- P. harlani = Acadoparadoxides harlani
- P. sacheri = Acadoparadoxides sacheri
- P. oelandicus = Acadoparadoxides (Baltoparadoxides) oelandicus
- P. pinus = Acadoparadoxides (Baltoparadoxides) pinus
- P. insularis = Eccaparadoxides insularis
- P. torelli = Eccaparadoxides torelli
- P. bidentatus Eccaparadoxides bidentatus
- P. lamellatus = Eccaparadoxides lamellatus
- P. pusillus = Eccaparadoxides pusillus
- P. opanol = Eccaparadoxides opanol
- P. kjerulfi = Holmia kjerulfi
- P. nevadensis = Olenoides nevadensis
- P. rotundatus = P. (Hydrocephalus) rotundatus
- P. torosus = Metadoxides torosus
- P. hicksii = Mawddachites hicksii
- P. brachyrhachis = Mawddachites? brachyrhachis
- P. sedgwickii = Plutonides sedgwickii
- P. haywardi = Plutonides haywardi

== Distribution ==
Fossils of Paradoxides have been found in Canada (New Brunswick, Newfoundland and Labrador), Colombia (Duda Formation, El Dorado, Meta), the Czech Republic, Denmark, France, Italy, Morocco, Norway, Poland, the Russian Federation, Spain, Sweden, Turkey, the United Kingdom, and the United States (Alaska, Massachusetts, South Carolina).
