= Evropeites =

Evropeites Temporal range: Early Ordovician–Sandbian

Scientific classification
- Domain: Eukaryota
- Kingdom: Animalia
- Phylum: Arthropoda
- Class: †Trilobita
- Order: †Phacopida
- Family: †Pliomeridae
- Genus: †Evropeites; Balashova, 1966
- Species: †E. hyperboreus

Binomial name
- †Evropeites hyperboreus Fortey, 1980

Extinct genus of trilobites

Evropeites is an extinct genus of trilobite in the family Pliomeridae. There is one described species in Evropeites, E. hyperboreus.
