= Gogoella =

Gogoella Temporal range: Early Ordovician–Middle Ordovician

Scientific classification
- Domain: Eukaryota
- Kingdom: Animalia
- Phylum: Arthropoda
- Class: †Trilobita
- Order: †Phacopida
- Family: †Pliomeridae
- Genus: †Gogoella; Legg, 1976
- Species: †G. brevis

Binomial name
- †Gogoella brevis Fortey & Shergold, 1984

Extinct genus of trilobites

Gogoella is an extinct genus of trilobite in the class Trilobita. There is one described species in Gogoella, G. brevis.

Some place it in the family Pliomeridae.
