= Anapliomera =

Scientific classification
- Domain: Eukaryota
- Kingdom: Animalia
- Phylum: Arthropoda
- Class: †Trilobita
- Order: †Phacopida
- Family: †Pliomeridae
- Genus: †Anapliomera; Demott, 1987

Extinct genus of trilobites

Anapliomera is a genus of trilobites in the order Phacopida, fossils of which are found in Illinois, U.S.A. It was described by Demott in 1987, and the type species is Anapliomera shirlandensis.
