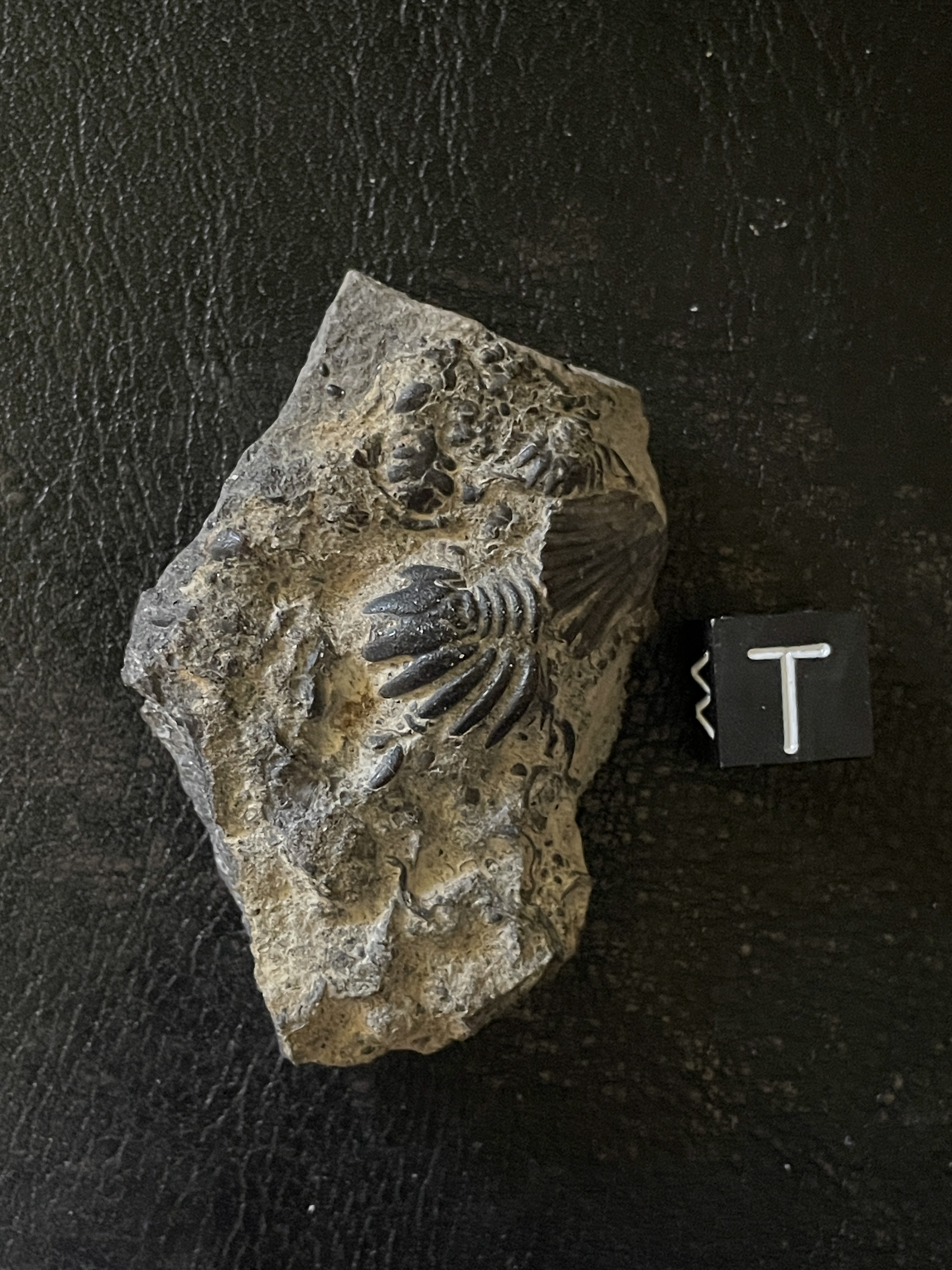
- Hintzeia from the Pogonip Group at Fossil Mountain in Utah

Scientific classification
- Domain: Eukaryota
- Kingdom: Animalia
- Phylum: Arthropoda
- Class: †Trilobita
- Order: †Phacopida
- Family: †Pliomeridae
- Genus: †Hintzeia; Harrington, 1957

= Hintzeia =

Extinct genus of trilobites

Hintzeia is a genus of trilobites in the order Phacopida (family Pliomeridae), that existed during the lower Ordovician in what is now the United States. It was described by Harrington in 1957, and the type species is Hintzeia aemula (type specimen: 26434 (AMNH)), which was originally described under the genus Protopliomerops by Hintze in 1953. Harrington also moved two other Protopliomerops species, P. celsaora and P. firmimarginis, under Hintzeia. The generic name is derived from that of the type species' author. The type locality was the Fillmore Formation in Utah.

== Species ==
- Hintzeia aemula (Hintze, 1953)
- Hintzeia celsaora (Ross, 1951)
- Hintzeia firmimarginis (Hintze, 1952)
