= Anabaraspis =

Anabaraspis Temporal range: Middle Cambrian

Scientific classification
- Kingdom: Animalia
- Phylum: Arthropoda
- Clade: †Artiopoda
- Class: †Trilobita
- Order: †Redlichiida
- Family: †Paradoxididae
- Genus: †Anabaraspis; Lermontova, 1951

Species
- A. splendens Lermontova, 1951 (type species); A. cylindrica Lermontova, 1951; A. divergens Bognibova c.s., 1971; A. emarginata (Schmidt, 1885) = Acidaspis emarginata; A. tenius Lazarenko, 1962

Genus of trilobites

Anabaraspis is a genus of redlichiid trilobite, A. splendens occurs in the uppermost Lower Cambrian and lowest Middle Cambrian of Russia (Toyonian and lower Amgan, A. splendens and Oryctocara Zones, northwestern and southeastern Yakutia). In Anabaraspis, there is an extended area in front of the glabella which is not differentiated into a border and a preglabellar field. It is a unique character in the family Paradoxididae.

The frontal lobe of the central raised area (or glabella) of the headshield (or cephalon) is slightly pointed rather than rounded or truncate, a character shared with Plutonides, though, in Plutonides, it hangs over the short anterior border.

== Description ==
The exoskeleton of Anabaraspis is relatively flat, oval to inverted egg-shaped. The glabella is subpentagonal with a blunt frontal tip and is widest near the back of the frontal lobe. The glabella is divided into three rings by furrows that cross the midline, although the most frontal is shallow in the middle. In front of that may be two faint sets of furrows that do not cross over.

The area in front of the glabella is relatively long (about one-third the length of the glabella) and not differentiated into a preglabellar field and the anterior border. The facial suture in front of the eye is long and strongly divergent, while the portion behind the eye in short. The genal spine is short and stout. The articulate middle part of the body (or thorax) has 15 to 18 segments with long, sickle-shaped spines. The inner part of the ribs is about as wide as the axis. The tailshield (or pygidium) is longer than wide, slightly hexagonal, with a long, flat posterior area. The rear margin of the pygidium is truncated or indented. The pygidial axis is short, with one axial ring. The surface is smooth.
