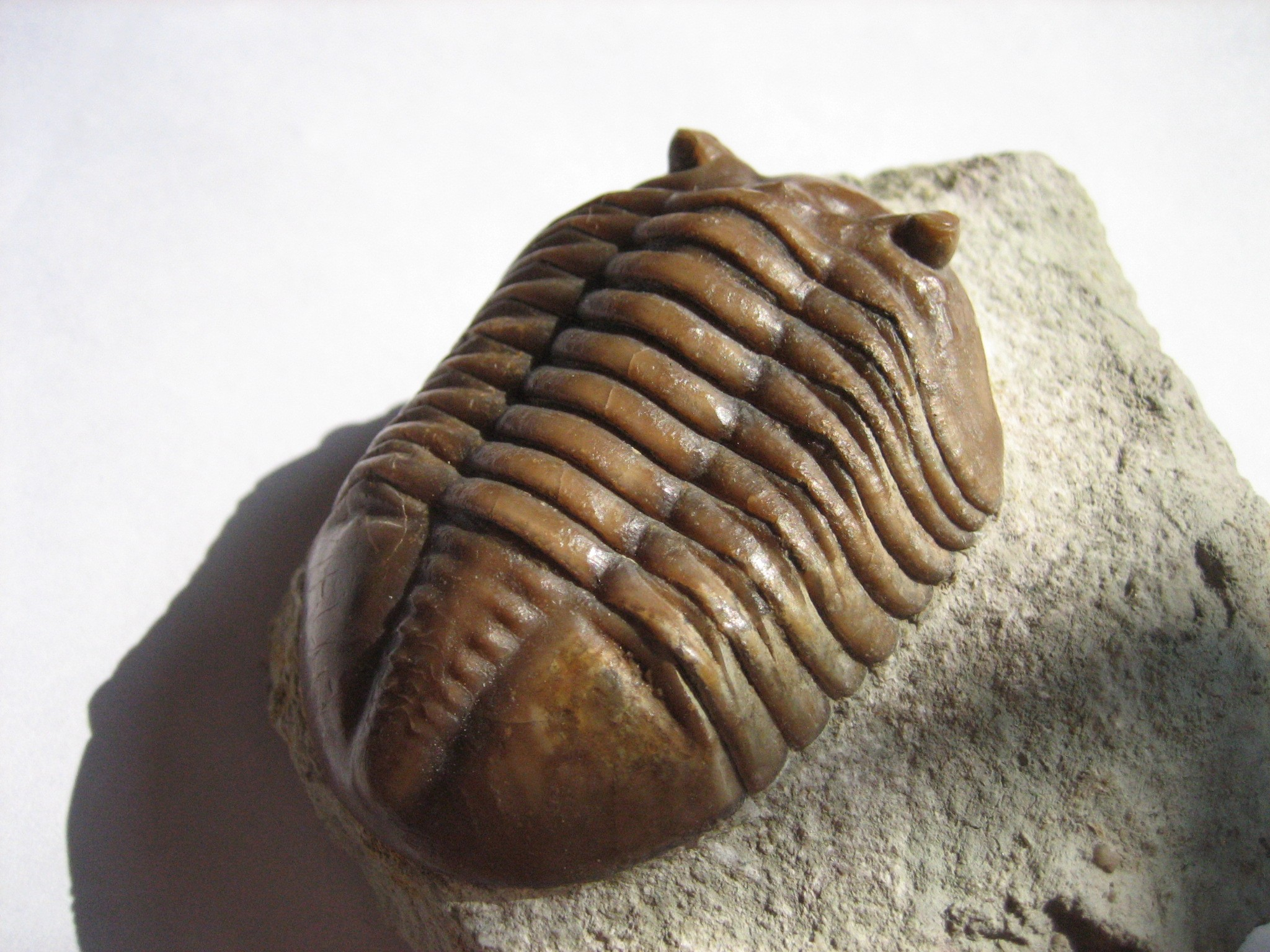

Scientific classification
- Kingdom: Animalia
- Phylum: Arthropoda
- Clade: †Artiopoda
- Class: †Trilobita
- Order: †Asaphida
- Family: †Asaphidae
- Genus: †Asaphus
- Species: †A. expansus

Binomial name
- †Asaphus expansus (Wahlenberg, 1821)

= Asaphus expansus =

Asaphus expansus Temporal range: upper Floian to Darriwilian

Species of trilobite

Asaphus expansus (/ˈæsæfʌs ɛkspænsʌs/) is the type species of the asaphid trilobite genus Asaphus. It was previously classified as Entomostracites expansus before being split off into its own genus.

== Location ==
Most specimens have been obtained in Northern Europe, with one known exception being in North America.

== Characteristics ==
Asaphus expansus differs from related species in its genus by having a cranidium that is considered broad, as opposed to its more medium sized counterparts. Examples of these other species are A. fallax and A. raniceps.
