= Josephulus =

Scientific classification
- Domain: Eukaryota
- Kingdom: Animalia
- Phylum: Arthropoda
- Class: †Trilobita
- Order: †Phacopida
- Family: †Pliomeridae
- Genus: †Josephulus; Warburg, 1925

Extinct genus of trilobites

Josephulus is a genus of trilobites in the order Phacopida (family Pliomeridae) that existed during the upper Ordovician in what is now Sweden. It was described by Warburg in 1925, and the type species is Josephulus gracilis. The type locality was the Upper Leptaena Limestone.
