= Encrinurella =

Scientific classification
- Domain: Eukaryota
- Kingdom: Animalia
- Phylum: Arthropoda
- Class: †Trilobita
- Order: †Phacopida
- Family: †Pliomeridae
- Genus: †Encrinurella; Reed, 1915

Extinct genus of trilobites

Encrinurella is a genus of trilobite in the order Phacopida, that existed during the middle Ordovician in what is now Burma. It was described by Reed in 1915, and the type species is Encrinurella insangensis, which was originally described under the genus Pliomera by Reed in 1906. The type locality was the Naungkangyi Beds.
