= Strotactinus =

Strotactinus Temporal range: Stage 10–Dapingian

Scientific classification
- Domain: Eukaryota
- Kingdom: Animalia
- Phylum: Arthropoda
- Class: †Trilobita
- Order: †Phacopida
- Family: †Pliomeridae
- Genus: †Strotactinus; Bradley, 1925
- Species: †S. insularis

Binomial name
- †Strotactinus insularis (Billings, 1865)

Extinct genus of trilobites

Strotactinus is an extinct genus of trilobite in the family Pliomeridae. There is one described species in Strotactinus, S. insularis.
