= Eyestalk =

Protrusion that extends an eye away from the body

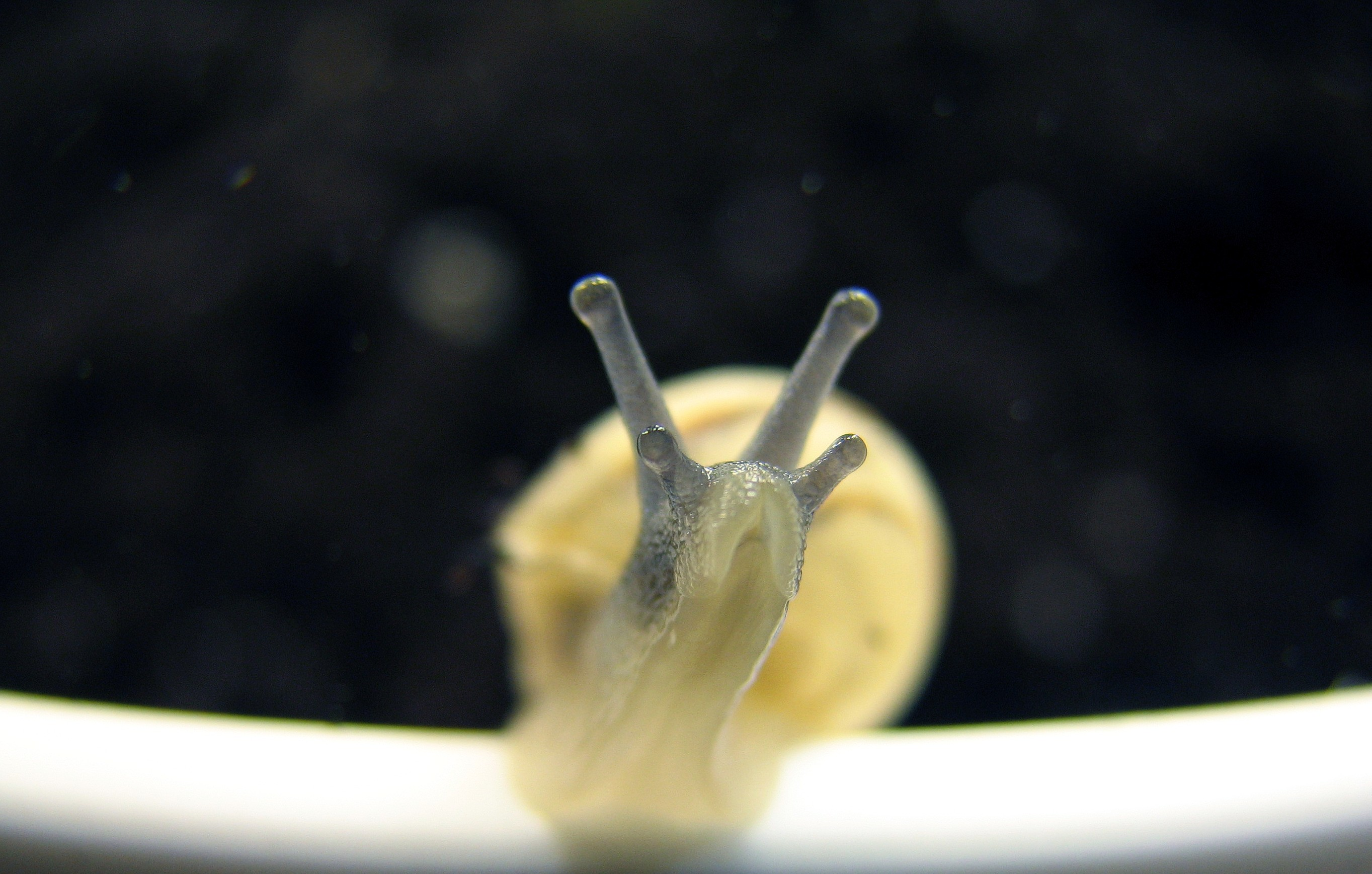
Pulmonate land snails usually have two sets of tentacles on their head: the upper pair have an eye at the end; the lower pair are for olfaction.

In anatomy, an eyestalk (sometimes spelled eye stalk and also known as an ommatophore) is a protrusion that extends an eye away from the body, giving the eye a better field of view. It is a common feature in nature and frequently appears in fiction.

== In nature ==
Eyestalks are a specialized type of tentacle. Tentacles may also have olfactory organs at their ends. Examples of creatures with olfactory tentacles include snails, the trilobite superfamily Asaphida, and the fly family Diopsidae. In slugs and snails, these tentacles will regrow if severely damaged, and in some species, are retractable. Crustaceans also have eyestalks, consisting of two segments.

== Gallery ==
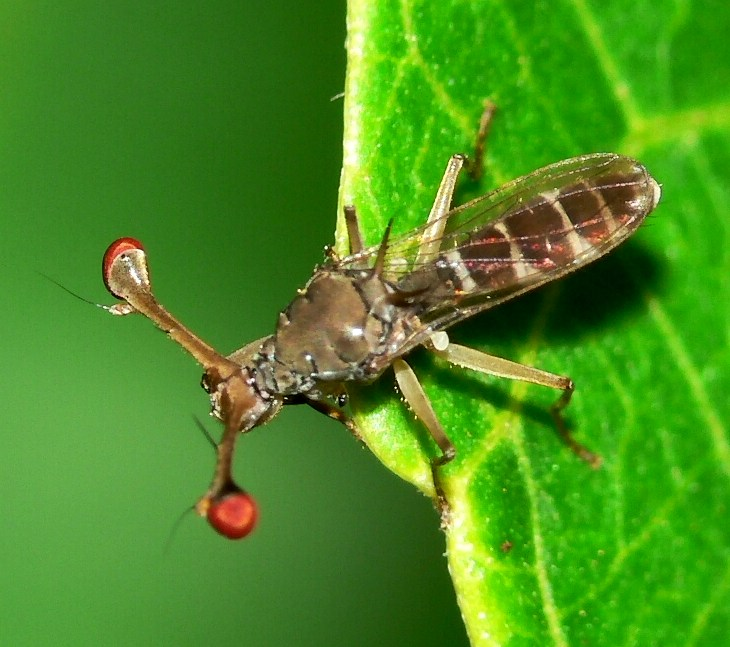
A stalk-eyed fly.

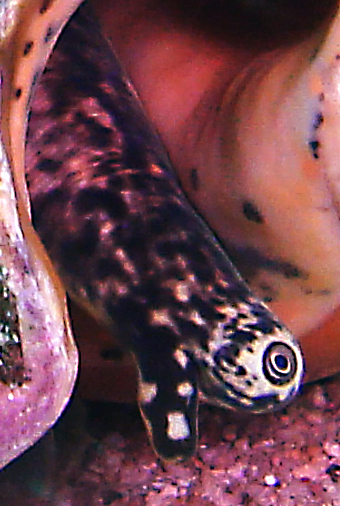
Well-developed eye of Eustrombus gigas on eyestalk. There is also a small tentacle on the eyestalk.

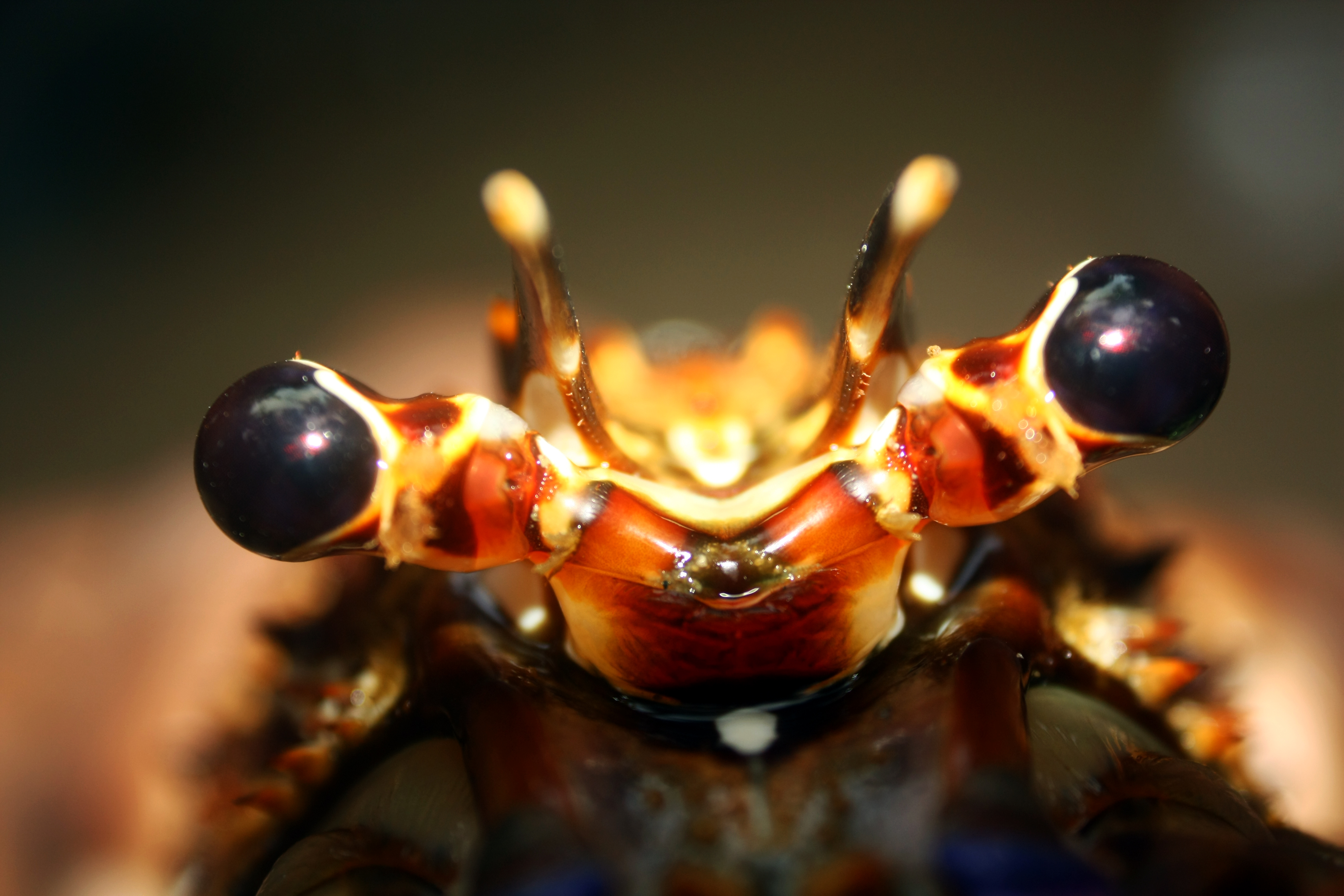
Eyestalk of a lobster.

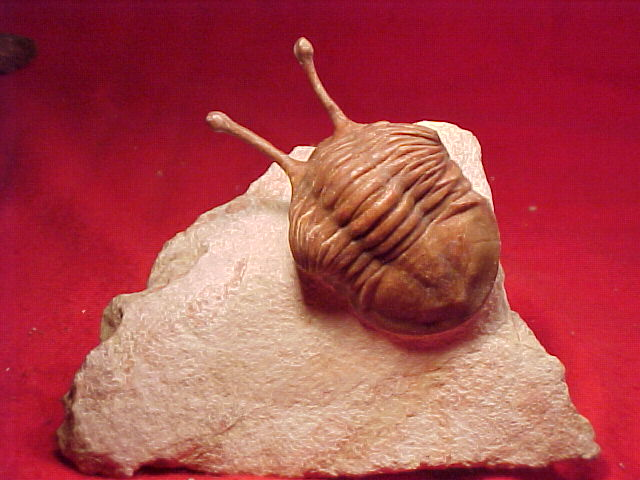
Some trilobites of the Asaphida, like this Asaphus kowalewskii, possessed long eye stalks protruding from their cephalon.

== See also ==
- Eyestalk ablation
- The cephalofoils of Hammerhead sharks
