= Schoriina =

Schoriina Temporal range: Cambrian

Scientific classification
- Kingdom: Animalia
- Phylum: Arthropoda
- Clade: †Artiopoda
- Class: †Trilobita
- Order: †Redlichiida
- Family: †Paradoxididae
- Genus: †Schoriina; Fedyanina, 1971

Species
- Schoriina elegans Fedyanina, 1971 (type species)

Genus of trilobites

Schoriina is a genus of trilobite, an extinct group of marine arthropods. The only known species is Schoriina elegans.
