= Bajanaspis =

Bajanaspis Temporal range: Lower Cambrian

Scientific classification
- Kingdom: Animalia
- Phylum: Arthropoda
- Clade: †Artiopoda
- Class: †Trilobita
- Order: †Redlichiida
- Family: †Paradoxididae
- Genus: †Bajanaspis; Ivshin, 1978

Species
- Bajanaspis sevrugini Ivshin, 1978

Genus of trilobites

Bajanaspis is a genus of trilobites that has been found in the Edreisk Formation, Kazakhstan, belonging to the Lower Cambrian.
