= Cybelopsis =

Scientific classification
- Domain: Eukaryota
- Kingdom: Animalia
- Phylum: Arthropoda
- Class: †Trilobita
- Order: †Phacopida
- Family: †Pliomeridae
- Genus: †Cybelopsis; Poulsen, 1927

Cybelopsis is a trilobite in the order Phacopida, that existed during the lower Ordovician in what is now Greenland. It was described by Poulsen in 1927, and the type species is Cybelopsis speciosa. The type locality for the genus was the Nunatami Formation.
