= Protoencrinurella =

Protoencrinurella Temporal range: Floian

Scientific classification
- Domain: Eukaryota
- Kingdom: Animalia
- Phylum: Arthropoda
- Class: †Trilobita
- Order: †Phacopida
- Family: †Pliomeridae
- Genus: †Protoencrinurella; Legg, 1976
- Species: †P. maitlandi

Binomial name
- †Protoencrinurella maitlandi Legg, 1976

Extinct genus of trilobites

Protoencrinurella is an extinct genus of trilobite in the family Pliomeridae. There is one described species in Protoencrinurella, P. maitlandi.
