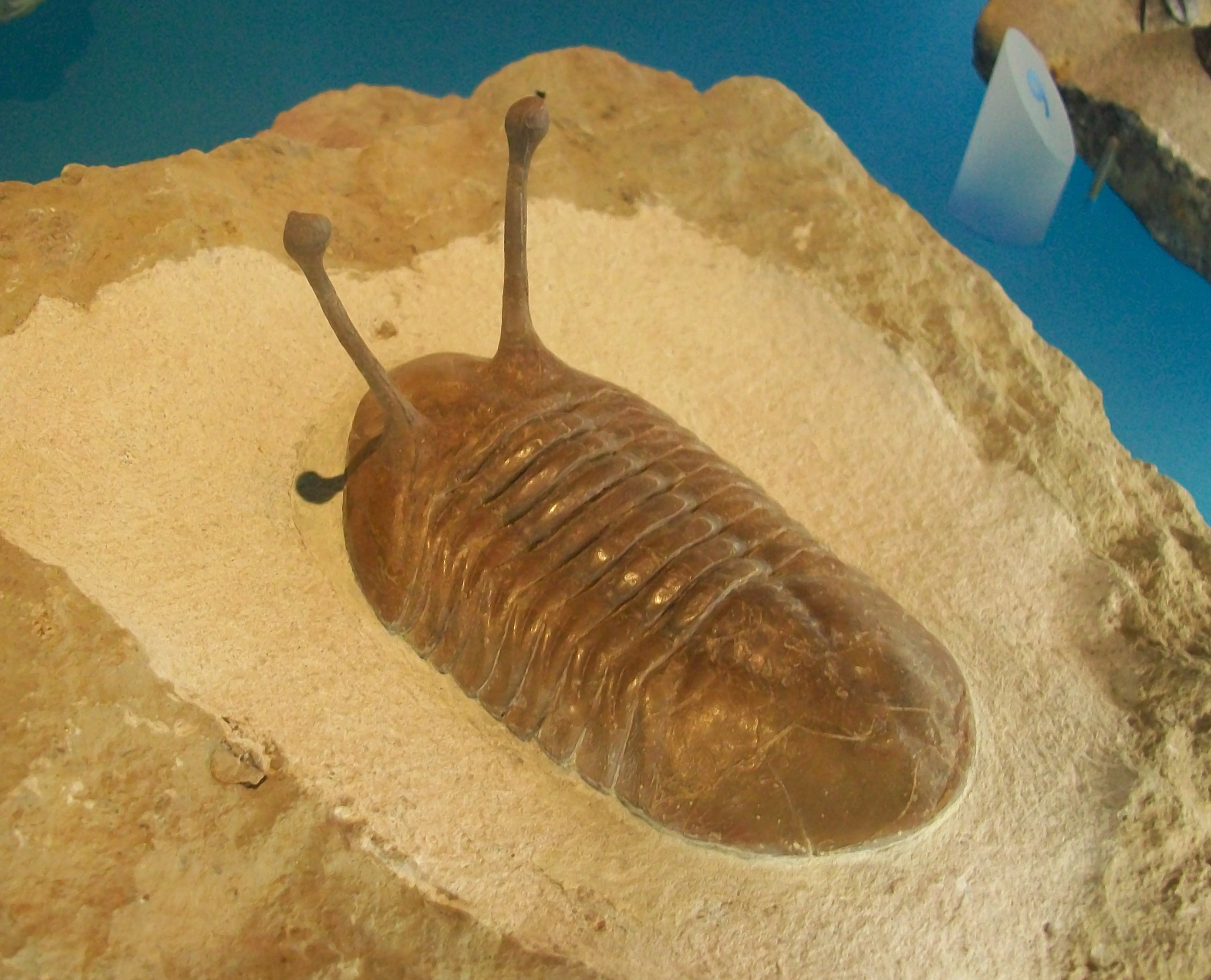
- Fossil of A. kowalewskii at the Field Museum of Natural History

Scientific classification
- Kingdom: Animalia
- Phylum: Arthropoda
- Clade: †Artiopoda
- Class: †Trilobita
- Order: †Asaphida
- Family: †Asaphidae
- Genus: †Asaphus
- Species: †A. kowalewskii

Binomial name
- †Asaphus kowalewskii Lawrow, 1856

Synonyms
- Asaphus (Trematophorus) kowalewskii Balashova, 1953; Asaphus (Neoasaphus) kowalewskii Jaanusson, 1953

= Asaphus kowalewskii =

Asaphus kowalewskii Temporal range: Middle Ordovician

Species of trilobite

Asaphus kowalewskii, sometimes misspelled as A. kovalevskii, is a trilobite species in the genus Asaphus, known from fossils found in Middle Ordovician deposits in western Russia, Estonia, and Poland. A. kowalewskii is mainly characterised by its long ocular pedicles (eyestalks), a feature which has made the species popular among international fossil collectors.

== History of research ==
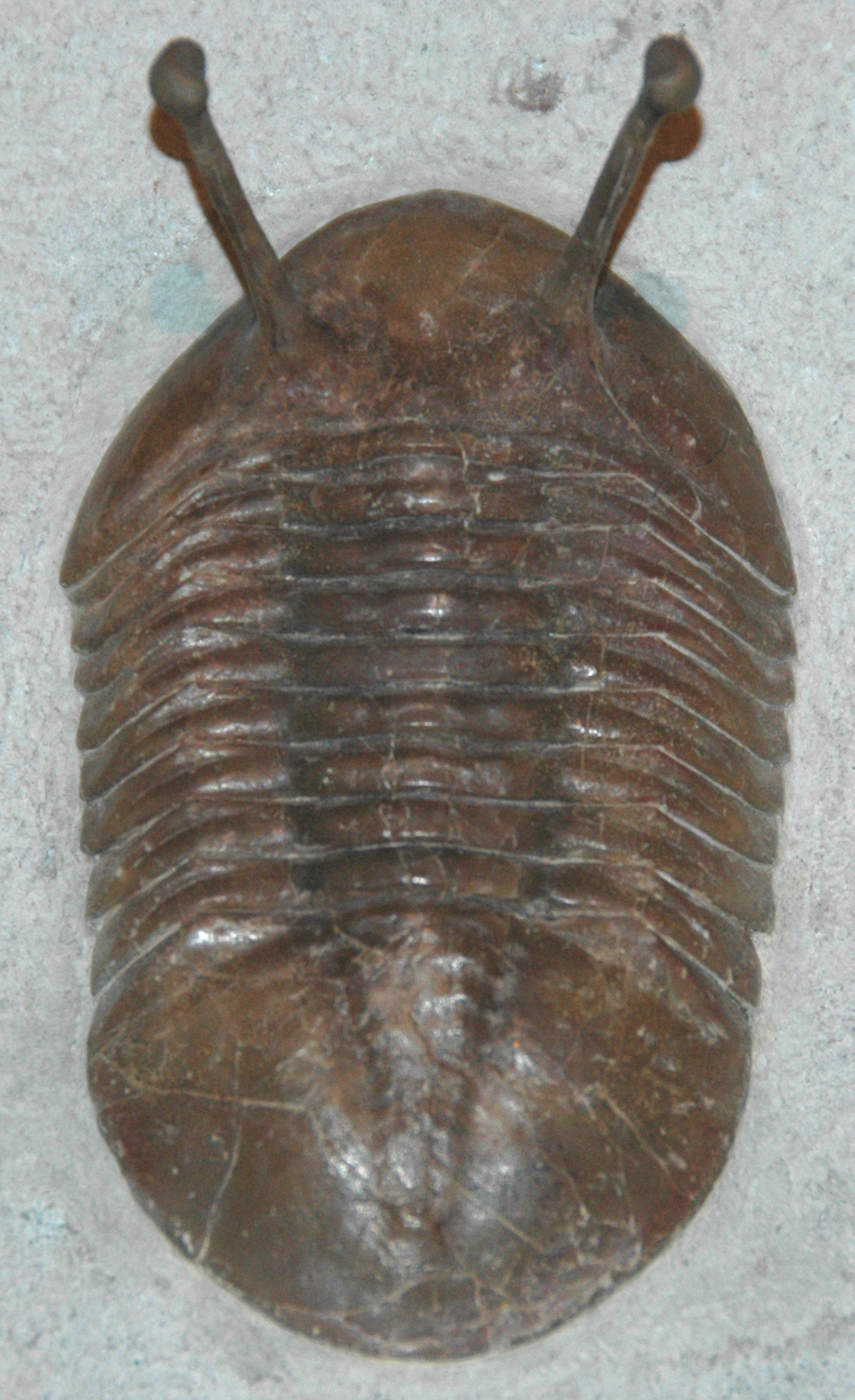
A. kowalewskii from the Volkhov River area, Russia

A. kowalewskii was described by N. Lawrow in 1856. In 1953, E. A. Balashova identified two fossils of A. kowalewskii figured by Friedrich Schmidt in 1901 as Lawrow's holotype and lectotype of the species, and proceeded to designate a neotype specimen, DPStPSU no 524/9243. DPStPSU no 524/9243 is a rolled up and partially destroyed specimen, found on the left bank of the Volkhov River. In 2003, A. Yu. Ivantsov deemed Balashova's identification of the specimens to be invalid, since they were not demonstrated to actually be Lawrow's original specimens, but nevertheless accepted the designation of a neotype.

A. kowalewskii is mainly known from fossils found in the Duboviki Formation, in the Baltic Klint of the Leningrad Oblast in Russia. In addition to Russian finds, A. kowalewskii has also been found in the Aseri Formation in Estonia, and the Pomorze Beds in northeastern Poland.

== Description ==
=== Size ===
A. kowalewskii is a medium-sized to large species of Asaphus. The largest known specimen has a cephalon (head shield) 49.5 millimeters (1.95 inches) wide, and the mean width is 39 millimeters (1.5 inches). The smallest known A. kowalewskii have a total body length of just 19 millimeters (0.75 inches).

=== Ocular pedicles ===
The most distinctive feature of A. kowalewskii is its eyes sitting atop long and spindly ocular pedicles (eyestalks). Several species of Asaphus have pedicles, though in no other species do they approach the length seen in A. kowalewskii. The pedicles can reach lengths of 5 centimeters (2 inches) or more. Like other trilobites, A. kowalewskii would have lived on the sea floor. The pedicles would have protruded up and allowed A. kowalewskii to see its surroundings even if its body got covered by sediment.

Smaller specimens of A. kowalewskii have comparatively shorter pedicles. This has been interpreted as the length of the pedicles changing through ontogeny, i.e. that juveniles had smaller pedicles and that they increased in length as the animal aged. Compared to other Asaphus species, long pedicles are nevertheless expressed in all known specimens, including the smallest known examples.

== Fossil collecting ==
Since the 1990s, Ordovician trilobites from Russia have been traded in the international fossil trade and have emerged as favorites among trilobite collectors. A. kowalewskii has in particular emerged as a species popular among collectors, due to the unique pedicles.
