= Colobinion =

Colobinion Temporal range: Early Ordovician–Sandbian

Scientific classification
- Domain: Eukaryota
- Kingdom: Animalia
- Phylum: Arthropoda
- Class: †Trilobita
- Order: †Phacopida
- Family: †Pliomeridae
- Genus: †Colobinion; Whittington, 1961
- Species: †C. julius

Binomial name
- †Colobinion julius (Billings, 1865)

Extinct genus of trilobites

Colobinion is an extinct genus of trilobite in the family Pliomeridae. There is one described species in Colobinion, C. julius.
