= Entomostracites =

Entomostracites is a scientific name for several trilobites, now assigned to various other genera.

- E. bucephalus = Paradoxides paradoxissimus
- E. crassicauda = Illaenus crassicauda
- E. expansus = Asaphus expansus
- E. extenuatus = Megistaspis extenuata
- E. gibbosus = Olenus gibbosus
- E. granulatus = Nankinolithus granulatus
- E. laciniatus = Lichas laciniatus
- E. laticauda = Eobronteus laticauda
- E. paradoxissimus = Paradoxides paradoxissimus
- E. pisiformis = Agnostus pisiformis
- E. punctatus = Encrinurus punctatus
- E. scarabaeoides = Peltura scarabaeoides
- E. spinulosus = Parabolina spinulosa
