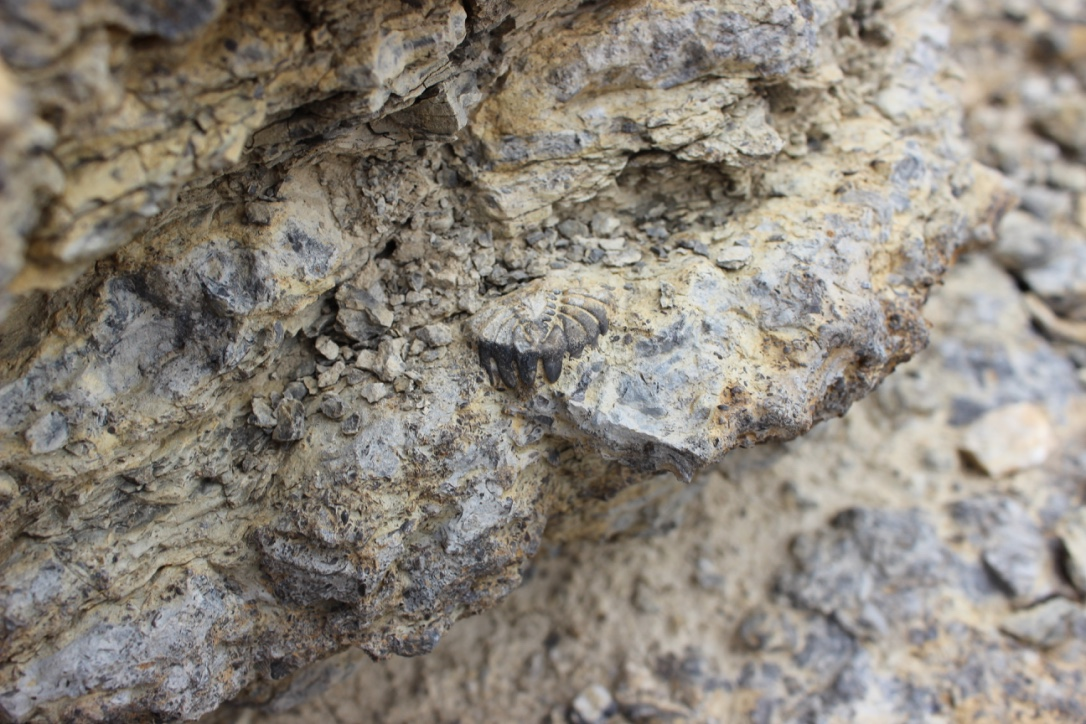
- Kanoshia kanoshensis pygidium from Utah

Scientific classification
- Domain: Eukaryota
- Kingdom: Animalia
- Phylum: Arthropoda
- Class: †Trilobita
- Order: †Phacopida
- Family: †Pliomeridae
- Genus: †Kanoshia; Harrington, 1957

= Kanoshia =

Extinct genus of trilobites

Kanoshia is a genus of trilobites in the order Phacopida (family Pliomeridae), that existed during the middle Ordovician in what is now Utah, United States. It was described by Harrington in 1957, and the type species is Kanoshia kanoshensis, which was originally described under the genus Pseudomera by Hintze in 1953. It also contains the species K. depressus and K. reticulata. The generic name is derived from the type species' epithet, which in turn is derived from the name of the type locality, the Kanosh Formation.
