= Pliomerina =

Pliomerina Temporal range: Middle–Late Ordovician

Scientific classification
- Domain: Eukaryota
- Kingdom: Animalia
- Phylum: Arthropoda
- Class: †Trilobita
- Order: †Phacopida
- Family: †Pliomeridae
- Genus: †Pliomerina; Chugaeva, 1958

Extinct genus of trilobites

Pliomerina is a genus of trilobites. A new species, P. tashanensis, was described from the late Ordovician of China by Dong-Chan Lee in 2012.
