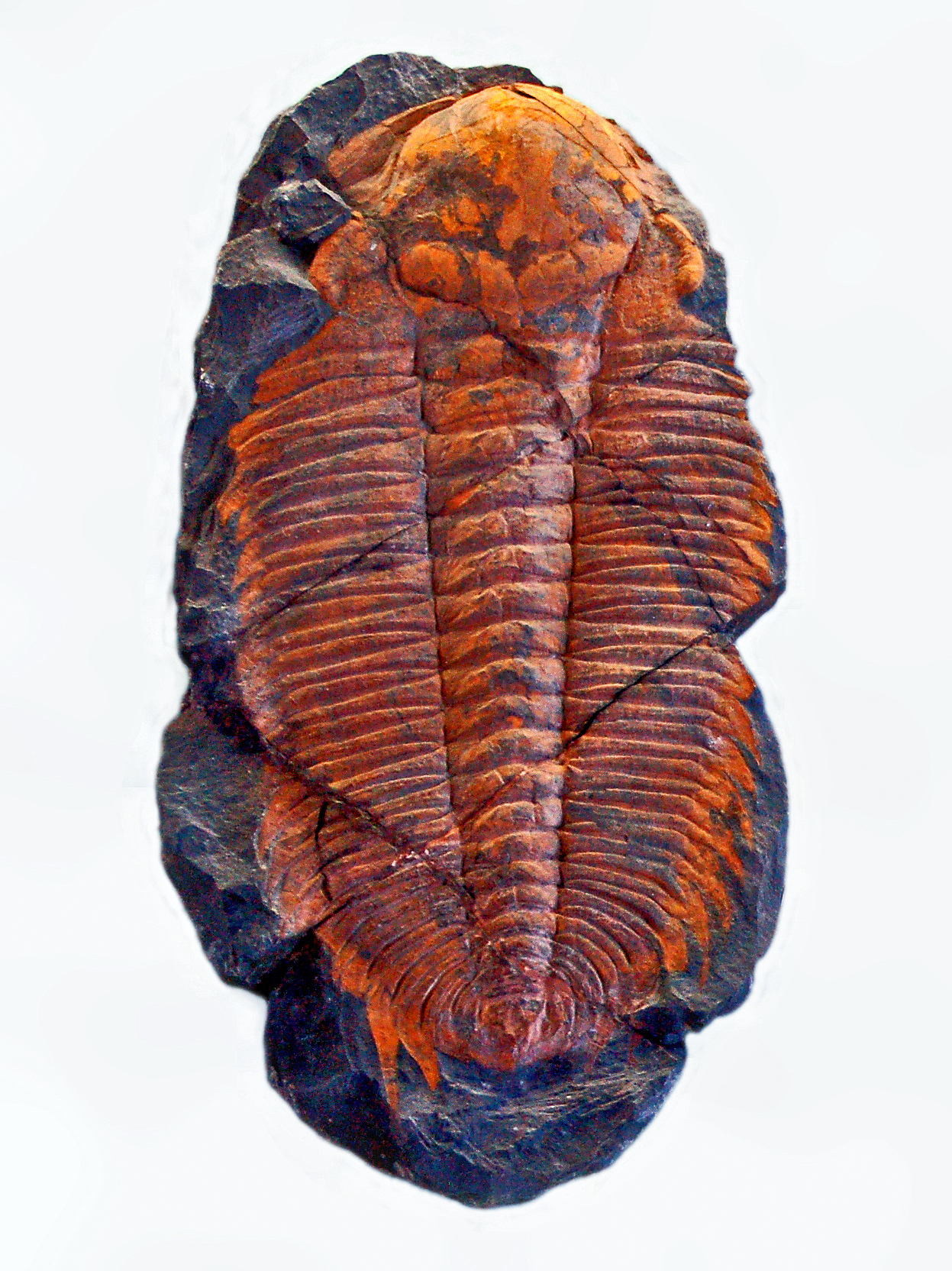
- Hydrocephalus carens at the National Museum (Prague)

Scientific classification
- Domain: Eukaryota
- Kingdom: Animalia
- Phylum: Arthropoda
- Class: †Trilobita
- Order: †Redlichiida
- Family: †Paradoxididae
- Genus: †Hydrocephalus; Barrande, 1846

Species
- H. carens Barrande, 1846 (type); H. lyelli (Barrande, 1852) = Rejkocephalus lyelli; H. mandiki Kordule, 1990; H. minor (Boeck, 1827) = Trilobites minor; H. paradoxum (Hawle et Corda, 1847) = Paradoxides paradoxum; H. rotundatus (Barrande, 1846) = Paradoxides rotundatus, Rejkocephalus rotundatus; H. spinulosus Rushton, Weidner & Ebbestad, 2016; H. vikensis Rushton & Weidner, 2007

Synonyms
- Phlysacium Hawle et Corda, 1847; Rejkocephalus Kordule, 1990

= Hydrocephalus (trilobite) =

Hydrocephalus Temporal range: Middle Cambrian

Genus of arthropods (fossil)

Hydrocephalus ("water head") is an extinct genus of redlichiid trilobite that was very common during the Middle Cambrian of Eurasia and North America, which lasted from 508 to 497 million years ago. This trilobite is up to 20 cm long and more widely built than others of the time. In comparison to other members of its family, its glabella appears swollen.

== Gallery ==
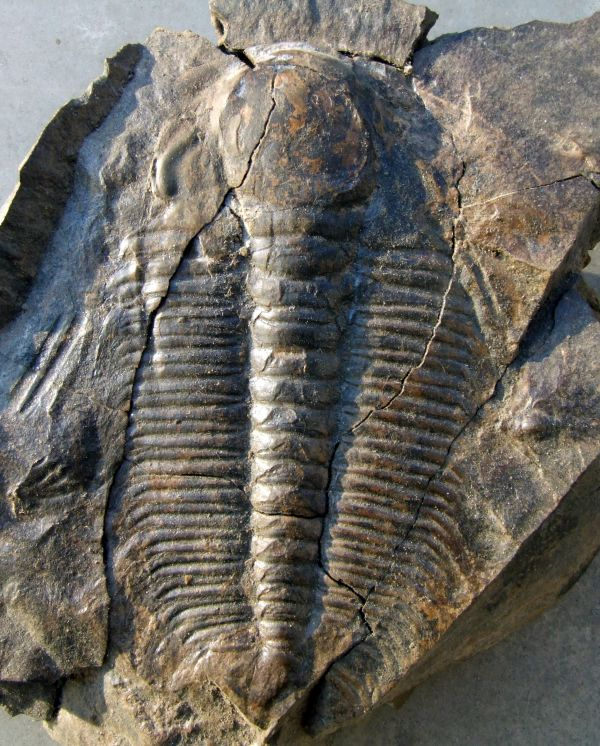
Hydrocephalus minor from Jince (Czech Republic)

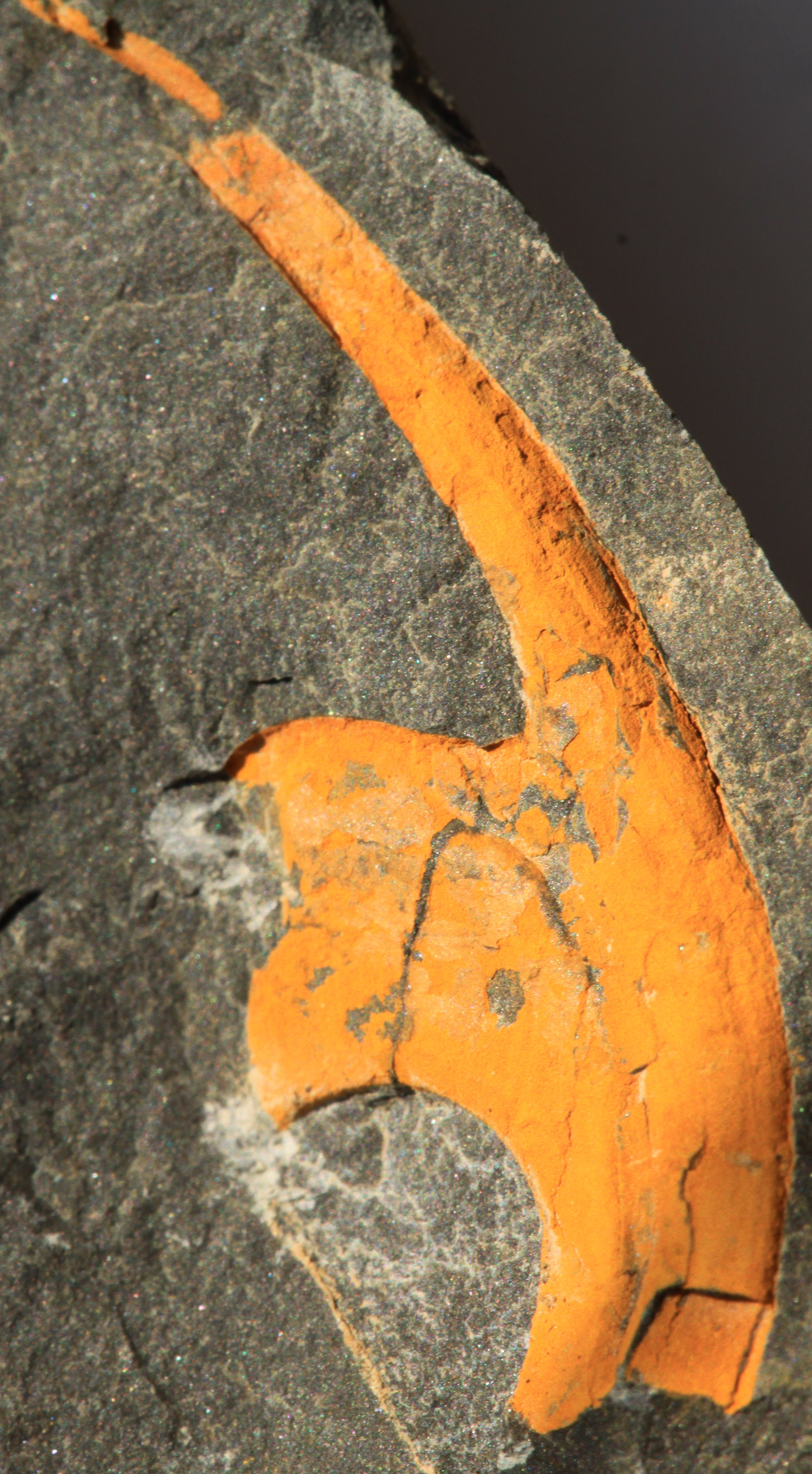
Free cheek of H. carens, 33mm between the tips

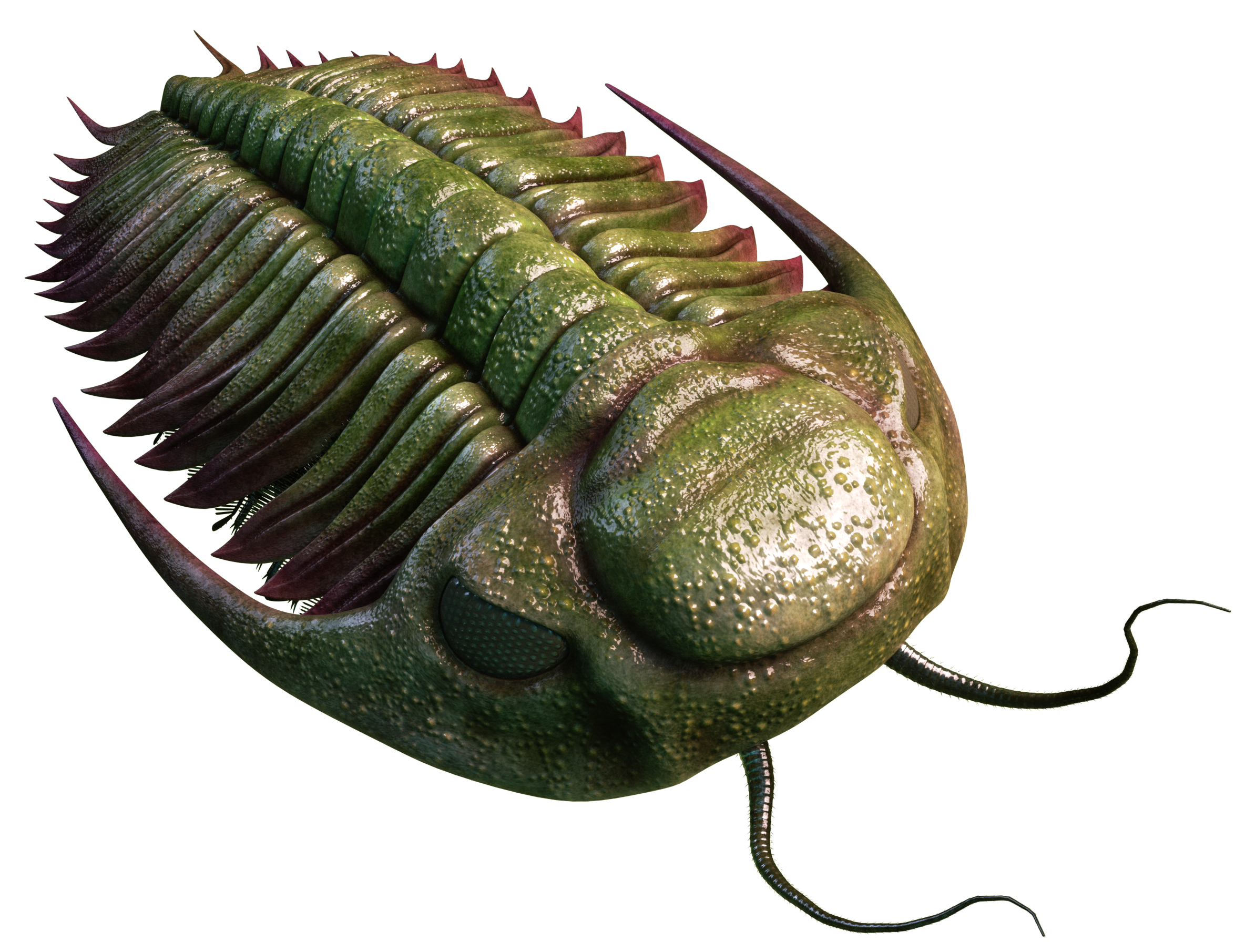
3D model
