= Basilicus =

3rd century Greek rhetorician

Basilicus (Ancient Greek: Βασιλικός) was a rhetorician and sophist of Nicomedeia. Many scholars believe he was one of the teachers of Apsines of Gadara, therefore he must have lived about 200 CE.

However, some scholars disagree that he was a teacher of Apsines, as the evidence for this is that Apsines calls him "the divine Basilicus", a convention that could mean he was a teacher of Apsines, but, some argue, also could mean that he had taught one of Apsines's teachers, or was a man simply admired by Apsines. However the general scholarly consensus is that he was, in fact, Apsines's teacher.

He was the author of several rhetorical works:

- On the patterns of words (περὶ τῶν διὰ τῶν λέξεων σχημάτων)
- On rhetorical preparation (περὶ ῥητορικῆς παρασκενῆς)
- On exercise (περὶ ἀσκήσεως)
- On transformation (πεπὶ μεταποιήσεως)

There were several other, more obscure sophists with this name in the 2nd and 3rd centuries.
