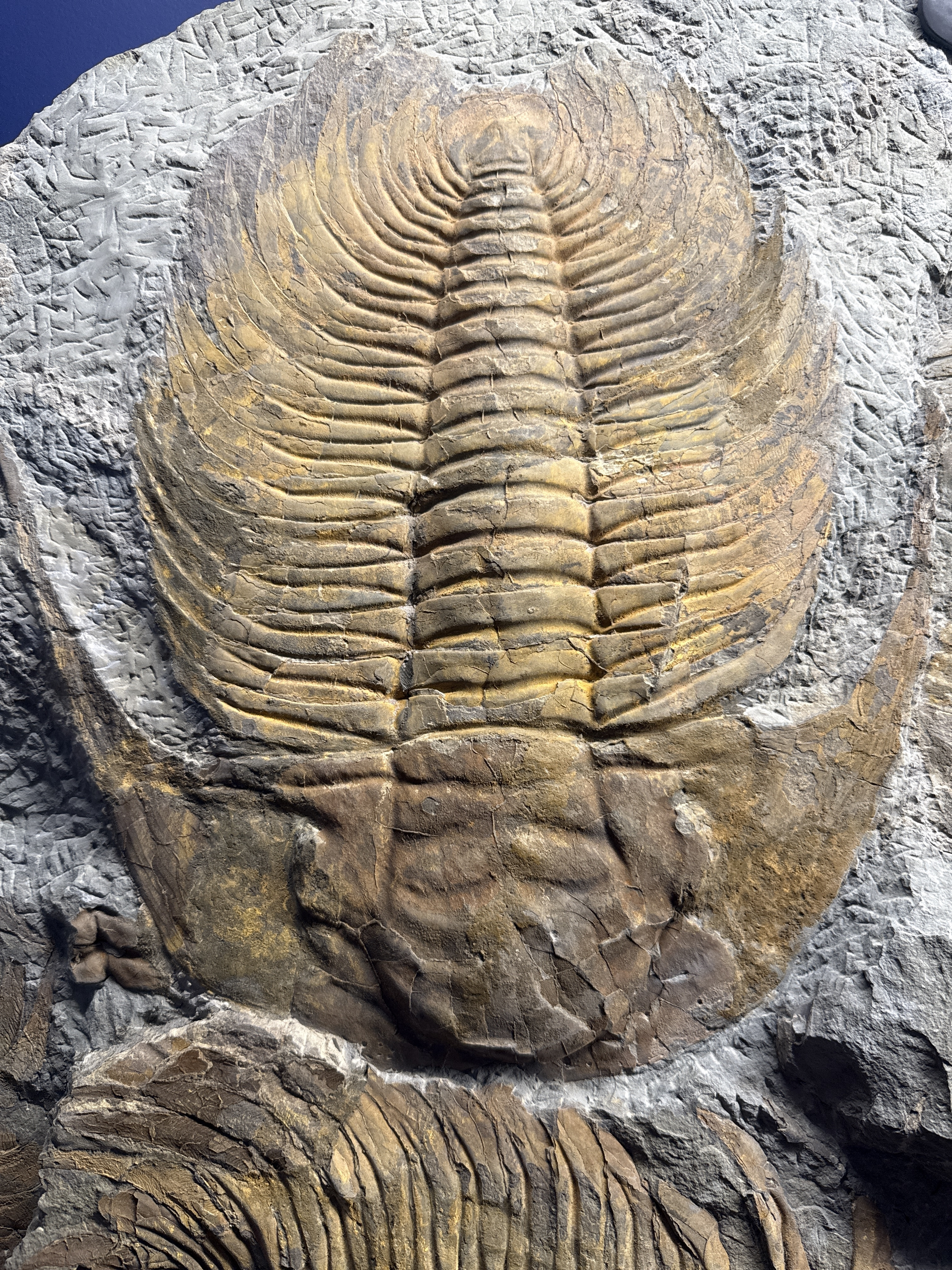
- A. briareus from Morocco, at the Royal Ontario Museum

Scientific classification
- Kingdom: Animalia
- Phylum: Arthropoda
- Clade: †Artiopoda
- Class: †Trilobita
- Order: †Redlichiida
- Family: †Paradoxididae
- Genus: †Acadoparadoxides; Šnajdr, 1957

Type species
- Acadoparadoxides sacheri (Barrande, 1852)

Subgenera
- Acadoparadoxides; A. sacheri (Barrande, 1852) (type species) = Paradoxides sacheri; Baltoparadoxides Šnajdr, 1986; A. oelandicus (Sjögren, 1872) (type species) = Paradoxides oelandicus

Synonyms
- Eoparadoxides

= Acadoparadoxides =

Acadoparadoxides Temporal range: Middle Cambrian

Acadoparadoxides is an extinct genus of redlichiid trilobite belonging to the family Paradoxididae. These fast-moving low-level epifaunal carnivores lived in the Middle Cambrian (abt 500 Ma).

== Selected species ==
The following species have been described:

- Acadoparadoxides briareus Geyer, 1993
- Acadoparadoxides deani Geyer and Vincent 2015
- Acadoparadoxides harlani Green 1834
- Acadoparadoxides levisettii Geyer and Vincent 2015
- Acadoparadoxides mureroensis Sdzuy 1958
- Acadoparadoxides nobilis Geyer 1998
- Acadoparadoxides ovatopyge Geyer and Vincent 2015
