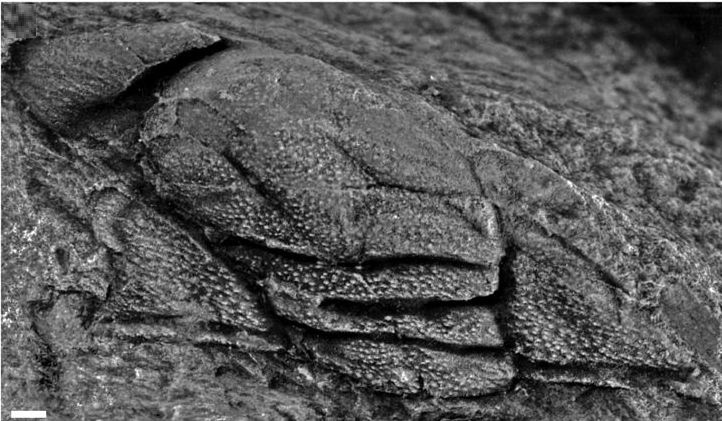
- Lectotype cranidium

Scientific classification
- Kingdom: Animalia
- Phylum: Arthropoda
- Clade: †Artiopoda
- Class: †Trilobita
- Order: †Redlichiida
- Family: †Paradoxididae
- Genus: †Plutonides; Hicks, 1895

Type species
- Plutonia sedgwickii Hicks, 1871

Species
- P. sedgwickii (Hicks, 1871); P.? illingi Lake, 1935

Synonyms
- Plutonia Hicks, 1871, non Plutonia Morelet in Stabile, 1864.

= Plutonides =

Plutonides Temporal range: Middle Cambrian ~514–497 Ma

Extinct genus of trilobites

Plutonides is a genus of Middle Cambrian trilobite in the family Paradoxididae with species Plutonides sedgwickii and possibly Plutonides? illingi. Several other species and subspecies were at times placed in Plutonides but have subsequently been moved to other genera.

In terms of the Scandinavian Middle Cambrian sequence the genus ranges from the Baltoparadoxides oelandicus Biosuperzone (B. pinus Biosubzone) at the type locality for P. sedwickii on Trwyncynddeiriog headland located 1.3 km (0.81 mi) south-southwest of St David’s Cathedral and 500 m (1,600 ft) east of Porth Clais Harbour - Pen-y-Cyfrwy Member, Newgale Formation, and possibly to middle part of the Mawddachites hicksii Biozone on the Penpleidiau (eastern) Headland of Caerfai Bay south of St David’s in southwest Wales, where P? illingi occurs [Locs. TC-1 & CF-1 of Rees et al.]

== Type ==
Plutonia sedgwickii is the type species for the genus and was first described in 1871 as "Plutonia" sedgwickii. However the genus name "Plutonia" had already been used for the Vitrinidae snail genus Plutonia by Morelet in Stabile (1864), and so the new genus Plutonides was coined by Hicks (1895). The species Lectotype is SM A1086, an internal mould of cranidium,.

== Species ==
Paradoxides cf. sedgwickii, described by Smith and White (1963) from the Baltoparadoxides pinus Biosubzone in the upper part of the Purley Shale Formation of Warwickshire, central England was redescribed by Rushton (1966, p. 42, pl. 6, figs. 1-10) as ‘Paradoxides’ sedgwickii porphyrus. The subspecies has broader palpebral lobes and finer surface granulation than observed in P. sedgwickii sedgwickii.

Vanĕk et al. (1999) described cranidia from the Middle Cambrian of Skrije - Týřovice area in the Czech Republic as Plutonides hicksi, although the specimens illustrated are of a different species to that from Wales. Fletcher (2007) however, has also since established the new subgenus, Paradoxides (Mawddachites), to include P. hicksii as type species. Alvarez et al. (2010) raised Mawddachites to a full genus.
