= Letná Formation =

Geologic formation in Czech Republic

- Stratigraphic range: Sandbian (Berounian); ~460–450 Ma
- Type: Geological formation
- Underlies: Vinice Formation
- Overlies: Libeň Formation
- Thickness: >600 m (2,000 ft)

Lithology
- Primary: Sandstone, shale, siltstone
- Other: Limestone, quartzite

Location
- Coordinates: 50.0°N 14.0°E
- Approximate paleocoordinates: 58.4°S 81.7°E
- Region: Prague
- Country: Czech Republic
- Extent: Prague Basin

Type section
- Named for: Letná Hill
- Named by: Havlíček & Vaněk
- Location: Malá Strana, Holešovice, Prague
- Year defined: 1966
- Coordinates: 50°05′40.5″N 014°25′03.0″E
- Letná Formation (Czech Republic)

The Letná Formation is a Late Ordovician (Sandbian, or in the regional stratigraphy Berounian) geologic formation of the Prague Basin, Bohemian Massif in the Czech Republic. The formation crops out in the Czech capital, more specifically at Letná Hill, after which the formation is named. The type locality is located at Malá Strana, Holešovice district.

The more than 600 metres (2,000 ft) thick formation comprises a rhythmic alternation of sandstones (greywackes and subgreywackes), quartzites, intercalated with siltstones and shales deposited in marine flysch-like environments.

Because of the excellent preservation, including gut remains, of a wide assemblage of early Paleozoic taxa in which trilobites dominate, the formation, which is lean in fossils in many areas but exceptionally rich in what has been interpreted as storm beds, has been designated a Konservat-Lagerstätte.

== Description ==
The Letná Formation was first formally defined in 1966 by Havlíček and Vaněk and crops out in the Prague Basin, a northeast–southwest trending minibasin stretching over 100 kilometres (62 mi) between Rokycany in the southwest and Úvaly in the northeast. The Prague Basin contains an Ordovician to Devonian succession in the larger Bohemian Massif. The formation conformably overlies the Libeň Formation and is overlain by the Vinice Formation. The Letná Formation is the thickest unit in the sedimentary sequence with a thickness of more than 600 metres (2,000 ft) between Beroun and Prague.

The formation consists of a rhythmic alternation of sandstones (greywackes and subgreywackes), quartzites, intercalated with siltstones and shales with limestone lenses in the upper part of the succession, deposited in a shallow marine environment, representing a flysch deposition in the early Paleozoic. While in most of the layers fossils are absent, certain levels contain a rich assemblage of shallow marine fauna interpreted as storm-induced beds. The concentration of a wide variety of excellently conserved fossils of the Letná Formation has granted it the name of a Konservat-Lagerstätte, giving insight into the diversification of marine ecosystems.

A rather diverse fauna composed of brachiopods, trilobites, echinoderms, conularids, and non-trilobite arthropods has been found in outcrops located between Zdice and Chrustenice. This area probably represented a rather shallow environment in the northwestern part of the basin. The fossils are usually fragmentary and preserved as internal or external moulds associated with angular claystone fragments within quartzose sandstones to siltstones. Accumulations of these fossil remains are commonly found in thick-bedded quartzose sandstones of light-grey and yellow or grey-brown color, which might have been deposited in areas sheltered from wave activity by sand bars.

Five communities of marine fauna were identified in the formation. The rich brachiopod dominated Drabovia Community is associated with shallow water, well-sorted quartzose sandstones. The Bicuspina Community, which probably represents a slightly deeper environment, is typically found in the poorly sorted greywackes of the higher horizons of the Letná Formation. These two communities constitute the Drabovia-Aegiromena Fauna. In more proximal environments, this fauna is replaced by the trilobite-dominated Dalmanitina-Deanaspis Association, which contains Birmanites ingens and Selenopeltis buchi. The more distal, probably deeper parts of the basin are characterized by a poorly diversified assemblage of trilobites associated with rare graptolites. Lastly, trilobites of the so-called Cyclopygid Biofacies and brachiopods of the Paterula Association are typical for the deepest portions of the Prague Basin. Intertidal (Skolithos ichnofacies) and near-shore (Cruziana ichnofacies) environments are also evidenced by ichnofossils.

Fossilized gut remains have been observed in four of the about twenty trilobite species present in the Letná Formation: Birmanites ingens, Dalmanitina socialis, Deanaspis goldfussi and Selenopeltis buchi. These four trilobites belong to the Dalmanitina-Deanaspis Association, characterizing rather proximal and shallow environments of the Letná Formation. Most of the non-trilobite arthropods discovered in this formation, including forms with non-mineralized exoskeletons, are also found associated with D. goldfussi and/or D. socialis. This suggests that the development of conditions conducive to soft-tissue fossilization was not uncommon in the environment represented by the Dalmanitina-Deanaspis Association.

== Fossil content ==
The following fossils were reported from the formation:

- Trilobites
  - Actinopeltis completa
  - Birmanites ingens
  - Calymenella parvula
  - Caryon bohemicus
  - Cekovia transfuga
  - Colpocoryphe grandis
  - Dalmanitina socialis
  - Deanaspis goldfussi
  - Eudolatites dubia
  - Eccoptochile (Eccoptochile) clavigera
  - Eccoptochile (Eccoptochiloides) tumescens
  - Kloucekia phillipsi
  - Pharostoma pulchrum
  - Placoparia (Hawleia) grandis
  - Plaesiacomia rara
  - Platycoryphe bohemica
  - Primaspis (Primaspis) primordialis
  - Selenopeltis buchi
  - Stenopareia panderi
  - Vysocania moraveci
  - Zeliszkella (Zeliszkella) hawlei
  - Girvanopyge sp.
  - Heterocyclopyge sp.
  - Prionocheilus sp.
- Non-trilobite arthropods
  - Duslia insignis
  - Quasicaris bohemica
  - Furca bohemica
  - Furca sp.
  - Zonozoe drabowiensis
  - Pseudoprotozoea
  - Bohemiacaris
- Crinoids
  - Caleidocrinus multiramus
- Lingulata
  - Lingula deleta
  - Orbiculoidea grandis
  - Schizocrania incola
  - Schizotreta sp.
- Gastropods
  - Asinomphalus antiqua
  - Bucania draboviensis
  - Bucanopsina calypso
  - Bucanopsis comata
  - Cyrtodiscus procer
  - Holopea antiquata
  - Tritonophon bohemica
  - T. peeli
- Paragastropoda
  - Antispira praecox
- Bivalves
  - Astarte convergens
  - Concavodonta ponderata
  - Grammysia catilloides
  - Leptodesma patricia
  - Modiolopsis veterana
  - Myoplusia bilunata
  - Praenucula bohemica
  - P. dispar
  - Deceptrix sp.
  - Palaeoneilo sp.
  - Alena pustulosa
- Crustaceans
  - Nothozoe pollens
- Ostracods
  - Cerninella bohemica
  - Crescentilla pugnax
  - Cytheropsis testis
  - Hastatellina sp.
  - Trubinella latens
- Rostroconchia
  - Ribeiria apusoides
- Blastoidea
  - Mespilocystites bohemicus
  - Anatifopsis sp.
- Rhynchonellata
  - Svobodaina ellipsoides
  - Jezercia chrustenicensis
  - Drabovinella draboviensis
  - Hirnantia ulrichi
  - Drabovia asperula
  - D. fascicostata
  - D. redux
  - Chrustenopora sp.
  - Onniella sp.
  - Saukrodictya sp.
- Craniata
  - Petrocrania obsoleta
- Strophomenata
  - Aegiromena aquila
  - Bicuspina cava
  - B. multicostellata
  - Rafinesquina occulata
- Tergomya
  - Barrandicellopsis extenuata
  - Cytherina graegaria
  - Dactylogonia blyskavensis
  - Sinuitopsis neglecta
- Tentaculita
  - Conchicolites confertus
- Edrioasteroidea
  - Hemicystites bohemicus
  - H. velatus
- Eocrinoidea
  - Ascocystites drabowiensis
  - A. cf. micraster
  - Echinosphaerites infaustus
  - Macrocystella bohemica
  - Cystidea obscondita
  - Rhombifera bohemica
- Stylophora
  - Mitrocystites mitra
- Soluta
  - Dendrocystites sedgwicki
- Scyphozoa
  - Anaconularia anomala
  - Archaeoconularia fecunda
  - A. insignis
  - Conularia rugulosa
  - Exoconularia exquisita
  - Metaconularia pyramidata
  - Pseudoconularia grandissima
  - P. nobilis
- Merostomata
  - Triopus draboviensis
- Polychaeta
  - Serpulites sp.
- Machaeridia
  - Plumulites folliculum
- Algae
  - Dendrocystis barrandei
- Other
  - Chasmatoporella havliceki
  - Versispira contraria

== Gallery ==
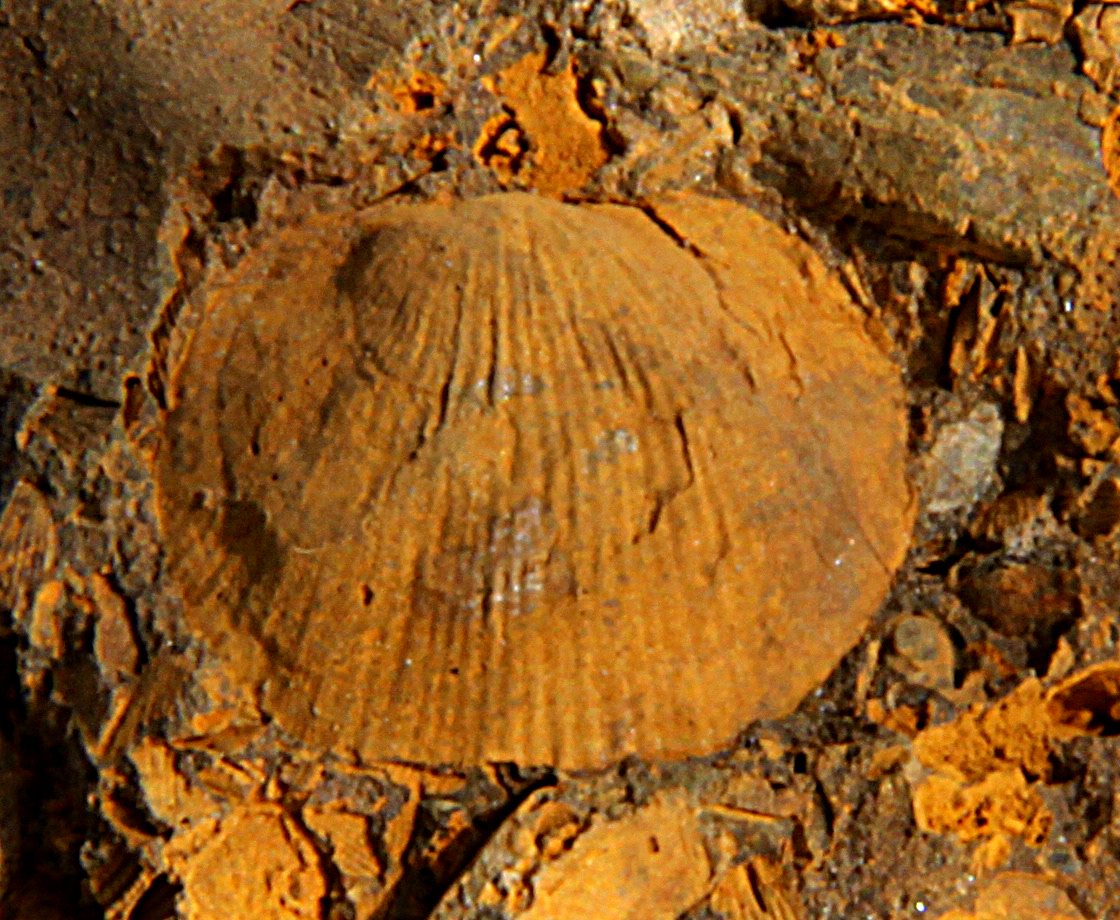
Bicuspina multicostellata

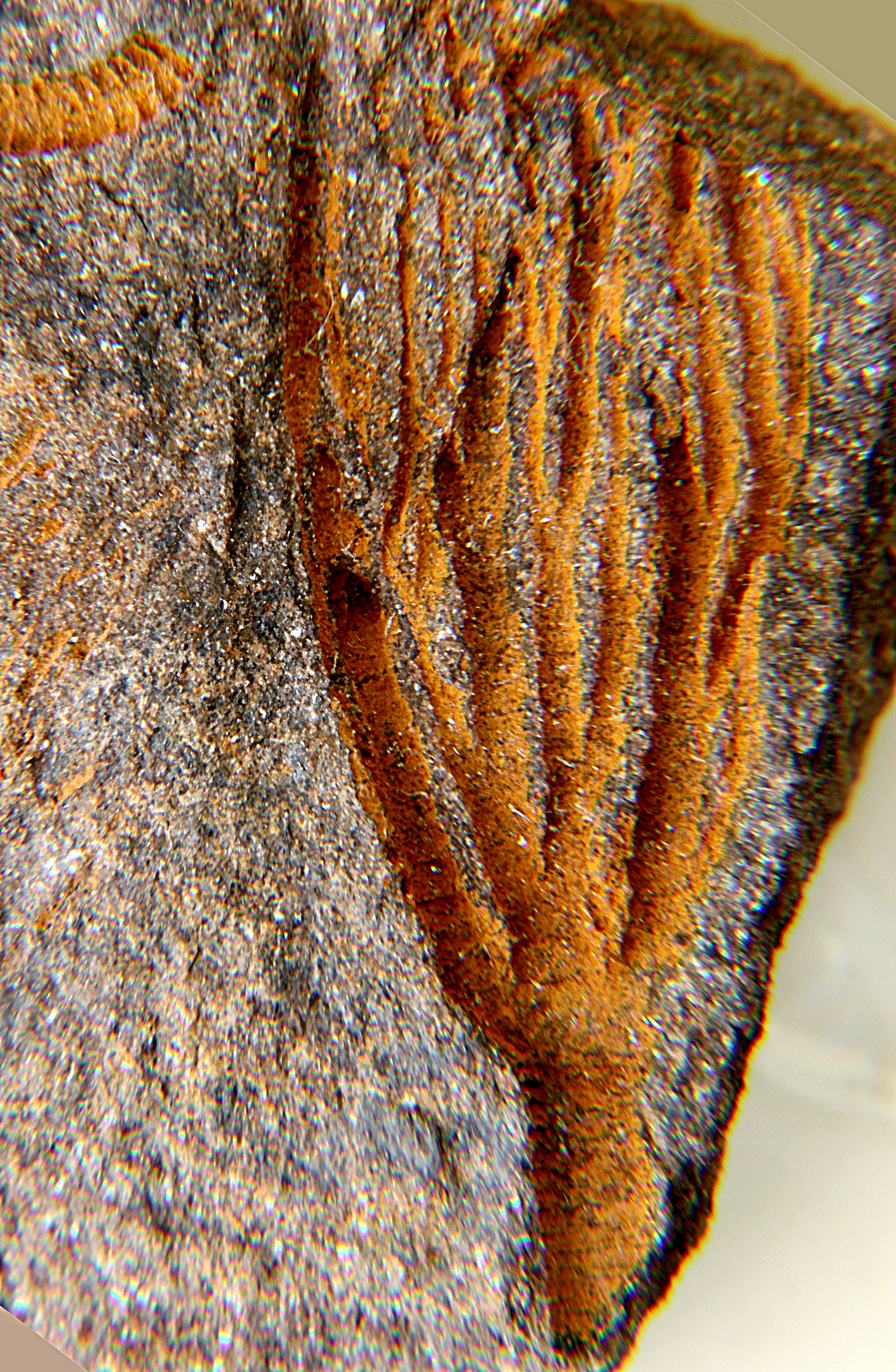
Caleidocrinus multiramus

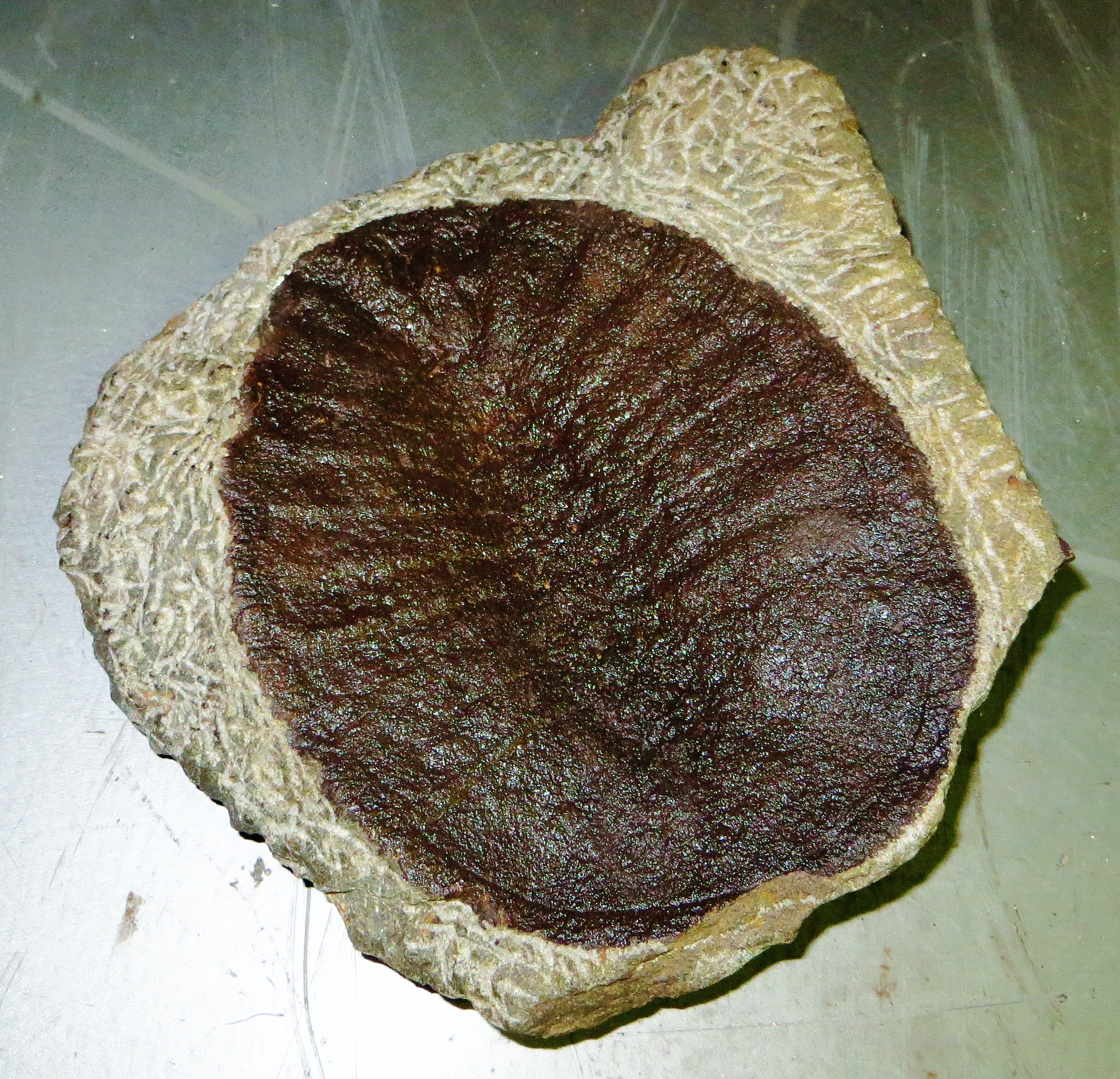
Duslia insignis

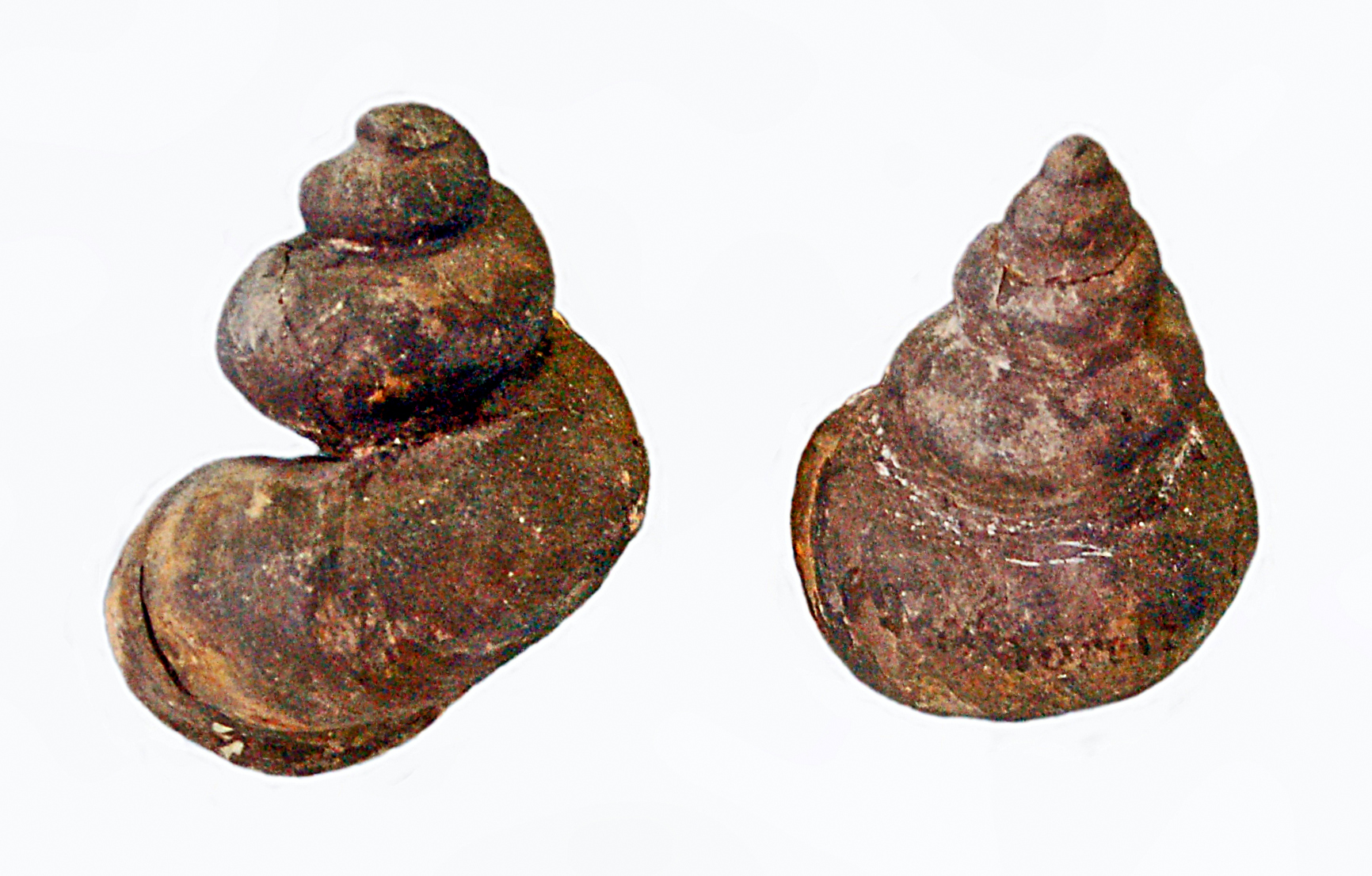
Holopea praestans

== See also ==
- Fezouata Formation
- Folkeslunda Limestone
- Soom Shale
