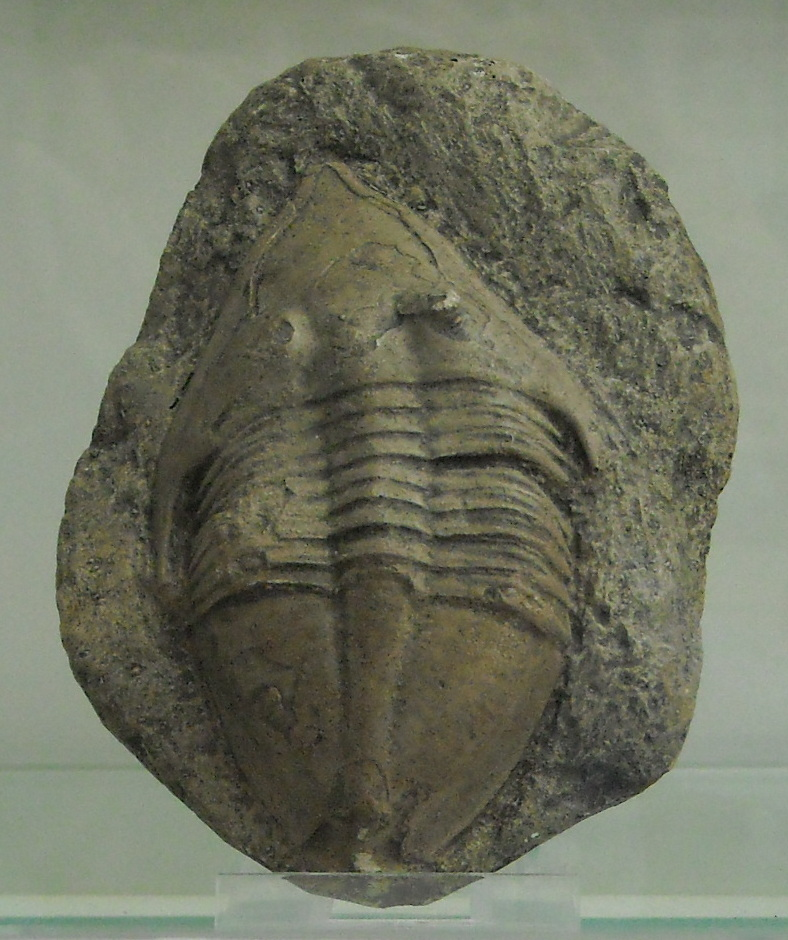
- Fossil of Megistaspis (Megistaspidella) acuticauda

Scientific classification
- Kingdom: Animalia
- Phylum: Arthropoda
- Clade: †Artiopoda
- Class: †Trilobita
- Order: †Asaphida
- Family: †Asaphidae
- Genus: †Megistaspis; Jaanusson, 1956

Type species
- Megistaspis limbata Boeck, 1838

Species
- 56, see text

= Megistaspis =

Megistaspis Temporal range: Early Ordovician-Middle Ordovician

Extinct genus of trilobites

Megistaspis (Greek for "largest shield") is a genus of asaphid trilobites that lived throughout the Early and Middle Ordovician. Megistaspis was common throughout the Early and Middle Ordovician of Baltoscandia, but specimens have also been found in Australia, France, Germany, Morocco, and the United States. Appendages and a digestive system of M. hammondi have been preserved; it likely served as a mixed detritivore, producing Cruziana rugosa trace fossils. Meanwhile, Megistaspis hyorrhina may have burrowed below the sediment, using a swelling on the head to detect pressure changes. Megistaspis is also notable as it displays a large degree of morphological variation as a result of environmental conditions like ocean depth and substrate. The genus plays an important part in the biostratigraphy of Baltoscandia from the Ordovician, with several biozones being named after Megistaspis species.

== History of discovery ==
The type species of Megistaspis, M. (Megistaspis) limbata, was described as Trilobites limbatus by Norwegian zoologist Christian Boeck in 1838. In 1851, Swedish paleontologist Nils Peter Angelin moved Trilobites limbatus, along with Entomostracites extenuatus and Asaphus heros, to the new genus Megalaspis and erected several new species, including Megalaspis gigas, Megalaspis explanata, and Megalaspis planilimbata.

In 1956, Estonian-Swedish geologist Valdar Jaanusson recognized that the name Megalaspis was preoccupied by the fish genus Megalaspis, named by Pieter Bleeker earlier in 1851. He therefore erected the genus Megistaspis to replace Megalaspis, choosing the name, which is Greek for "largest shield", to be as similar to the old name Megalaspis as possible. Jaanusson created two subgenera: M. (Megistaspis) to accommodate forms with a strongly convex thoracic rachis and triangular cephalon, and M. (Megistaspidella) to accommodate later forms with a flat thoracic rachis and elongate cephalon, as well as suggesting the existence of a third group, composed of early forms with a somewhat flat thoracic rachis but semicircular cephalon, which he called the M. planilimbata group.

Also in 1956, Scandinavian paleontologist Torsten E. Tjernvik moved Megistaspis planilimbata to the subgenus Plesiomegalaspis (Plesiomegalaspis) and erected the new species Plesiomegalaspis estonica, Plesiomegalaspis norvegica, and Plesiomegalaspis scutata in addition to creating the new subgenus Plesiomegalaspis (Ekeraspis), containing forms with a long pygidial spine and deep posterior border furrow of the cephalon, to accommodate Megalaspis heroides and his new species Plesiomegalaspis armata.

In 1976, Soviet paleontologist E. A. Balashova split the genus Megistaspis into several genera as part of the family Megistaspisidae, which also included Plesiomegalaspis and several other genera. Balashova (1976) created several new genera: she created the genus Paramegistaspis, comprising forms previously within the M. planilimbata group, to accommodate P. planilimbata, P. estonica, P. norvegica, P. scutata and their relatives and the genus Rhinoferus, composed of forms with a large swelling on the glabella, to accommodate M. hyorrhina and its relatives. In addition, M. (Megistaspidella) was split into the genus Megistaspidella and P. (Ekeraspis) was split into the genus Ekeraspis. In 1983, B. T. Wandås created the subgenus M. (Heraspis), containing forms with a wide cephalon and a long pygidial spine, to accommodate two species: M. heroica and M. laticauda.

In 1995, Danish paleontologist Arne Thorshøj Nielsen demoted the genera Megistaspidella, Paramegistaspis, Rhinoferus, and Ekeraspis to subgenera of Megistaspis, giving Megistaspis six subgenera: Megistaspis, Megistaspidella, Paramegistaspis, Rhinoferus, Ekeraspis, and Heraspis. Heraspis was subsequently subsumed into Megistaspidella by Hansen, 2009.

== Description ==
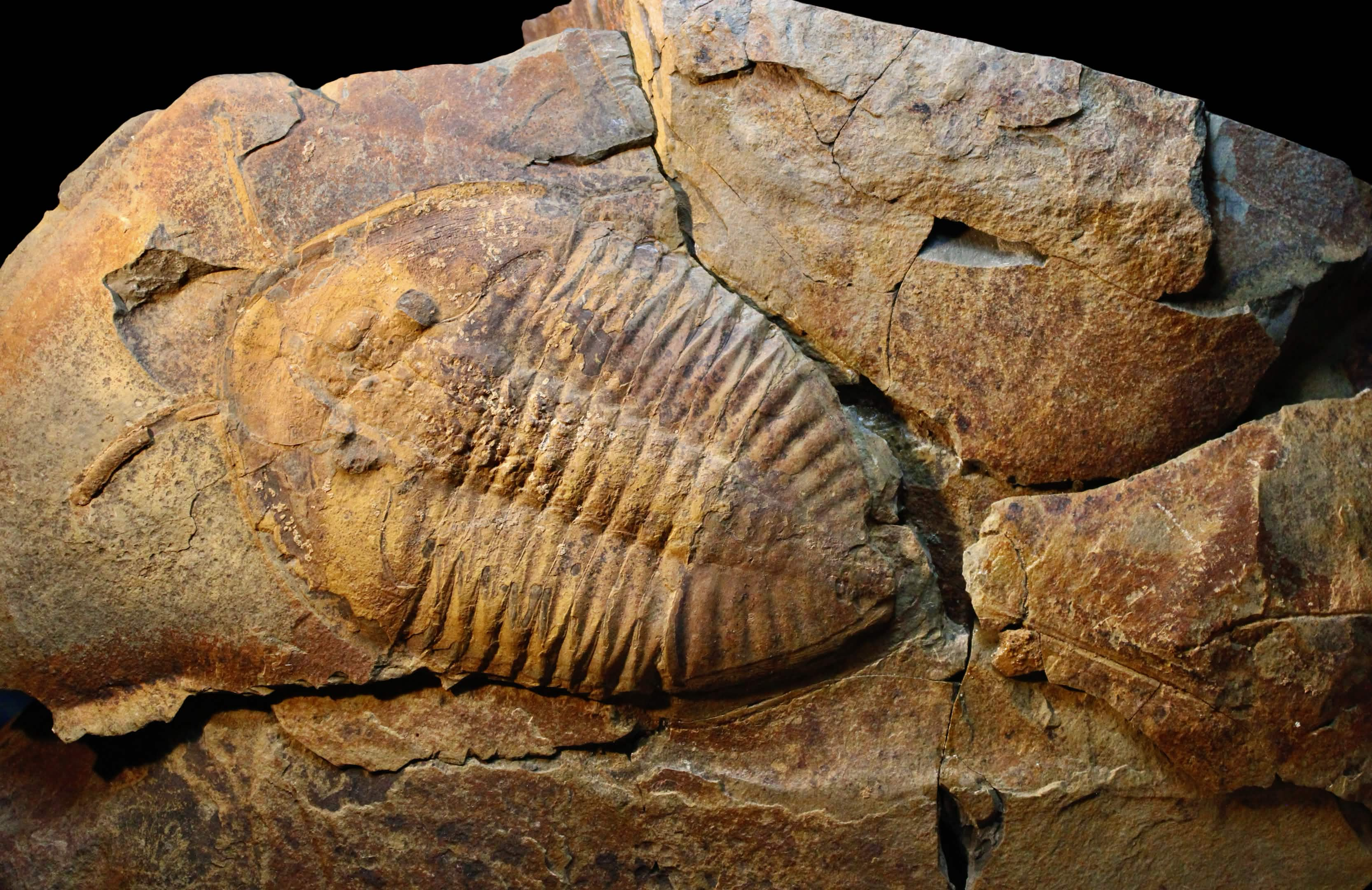
Complete specimen of Megistaspis (Ekeraspis) hammondi with preserved antennae

Megistaspis is a large genus of asaphid trilobite, with several species reaching lengths in excess of 25 centimeters. Like other asaphid trilobites, Megistaspis has a cephalon, eight thoracic segments, and a pygidium which may or may not bear a terminal spine.

The cephalon is large and semielliptical or triangular. The glabella is almost rectangular, with a semicircular frontal lobe, and the preglabellar field (the area of the cephalon in front of the glabella) is long and can reach over a quarter of the length of the cephalon. The facial sutures diverge strongly directly in front of the eyes before curving into a point in front of the glabella. The eyes are holochroal, small- to medium- sized, and situated around halfway along the length of the cephalon very close to the axial furrows which differentiate the axial lobe from the pleural lobes. The free cheeks (librigenae) are composed of a narrow anterior process that runs along the preglabellar field, a triangular middle portion designated as the body of the free cheek, and a posterior process that forms the genal spines, which extend backward from the rear corners of the cephalon. In most species of Megistaspis (other than M. (Megistaspidella) gigas and certain other members of the same species group), the peripheral rim of the free cheeks is flattened and the lateral parts of the cephalon are concave, forming a distinct marginal rim and border between the rim and the rest of the cephalon. The anterior body of the hypostome is arched and oval, with a weakly present or absent median furrow, while the posterior body of the hypostome takes the form of a narrow crescent. The lateral body of the hypostome is broad with distinct and rounded lateral projections. The posterior margin of the hypostome can be slightly concave (as in M. (Megistaspis)), evenly rounded, or slightly pointed (as in M. (Megistaspidella)).

The thorax is composed of eight segments with a narrow rachis. The pleural portion of the doublure (a rim around the ventral margin of the body formed by a folding over of the dorsal segments) have straight inner margins and bear Panderian notches. The Panderian notches, which may have contributed to enrollment, take the form of a hole in the doublure and are also present on the doublure of the free cheeks. The pygidium is roughly equal in size to the cephalon, is triangular or semicircular, and, like the cephalon, has concave lateral parts that form a distinct marginal rim. The rachis is distinctly segmented, with an articular half-ring followed by an articular furrow and several pygidial rings (between seven rings in M. (Ekeraspis) hammondi and up to 27 rings in M. (Megistaspidella) curvispina and M. (Megistaspidella) gigas). The first three rings are usually divided into an anterior and posterior half by a median depression. The pleural lobe of the pygidium bears ribs that may be undeveloped or distinctly furrowed. The pygidial doublure is narrow with a parabolic inner border. The pygidium may (as in M. (Ekeraspis) and some species of M. (Megistaspidella)) or may not (as in M. (Megistaspis), M. (Rhinoferus), M. (Paramegistaspis) and some species of M. (Megistaspidella)) bear a terminal spine.

=== Appendages ===
Preserved appendages have been found in several specimens of M. hammondi, a large species of Megistaspis from the Fezouata Biota. One specimen in particular, MGM-6756X, preserves a complete set of endopods. This specimen shows that M. hammondi has 21 pairs of limbs: three pairs of cephalic limbs, eight pairs of thoracic limbs, and 10 pairs of pygidial limbs. M. hammondi has slight heteropody as its cephalic limbs are larger and heavier than its thoracic and pygidial limbs. The cephalic limbs also bear spines on podomeres 2–4, with the best-preserved cephalic appendage of specimen MGM-6756X preserving 11 spines dorsally and 7 spines ventrally. No spines are present on the thoracic or pygidial limbs. An additional specimen, MGM-7569X, preserves part of the right antenna in addition to the distal portions of the endopods and exopods. Antennae can also be observed in many commercially sold specimens, but they usually exhibit varying degrees of cosmetic modification, including the addition of extra podomeres, the adding of spines to the abaxial side of the antenna, and the outlining of the rock surrounding the antennae with "cat ears".

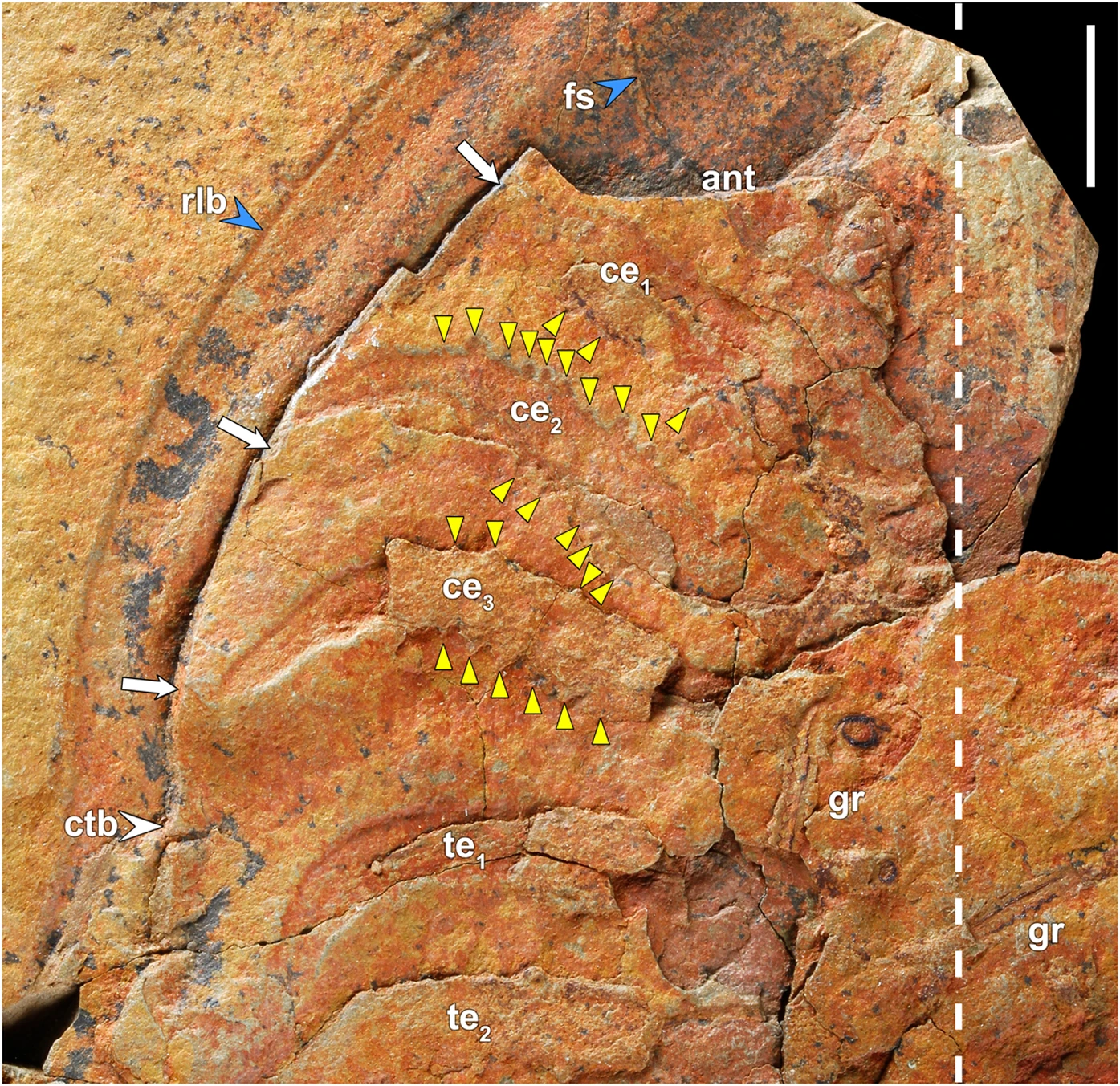
Cephalic and first thoracic endopods of M. hammondi specimen MGM-6756X

=== Digestive system ===
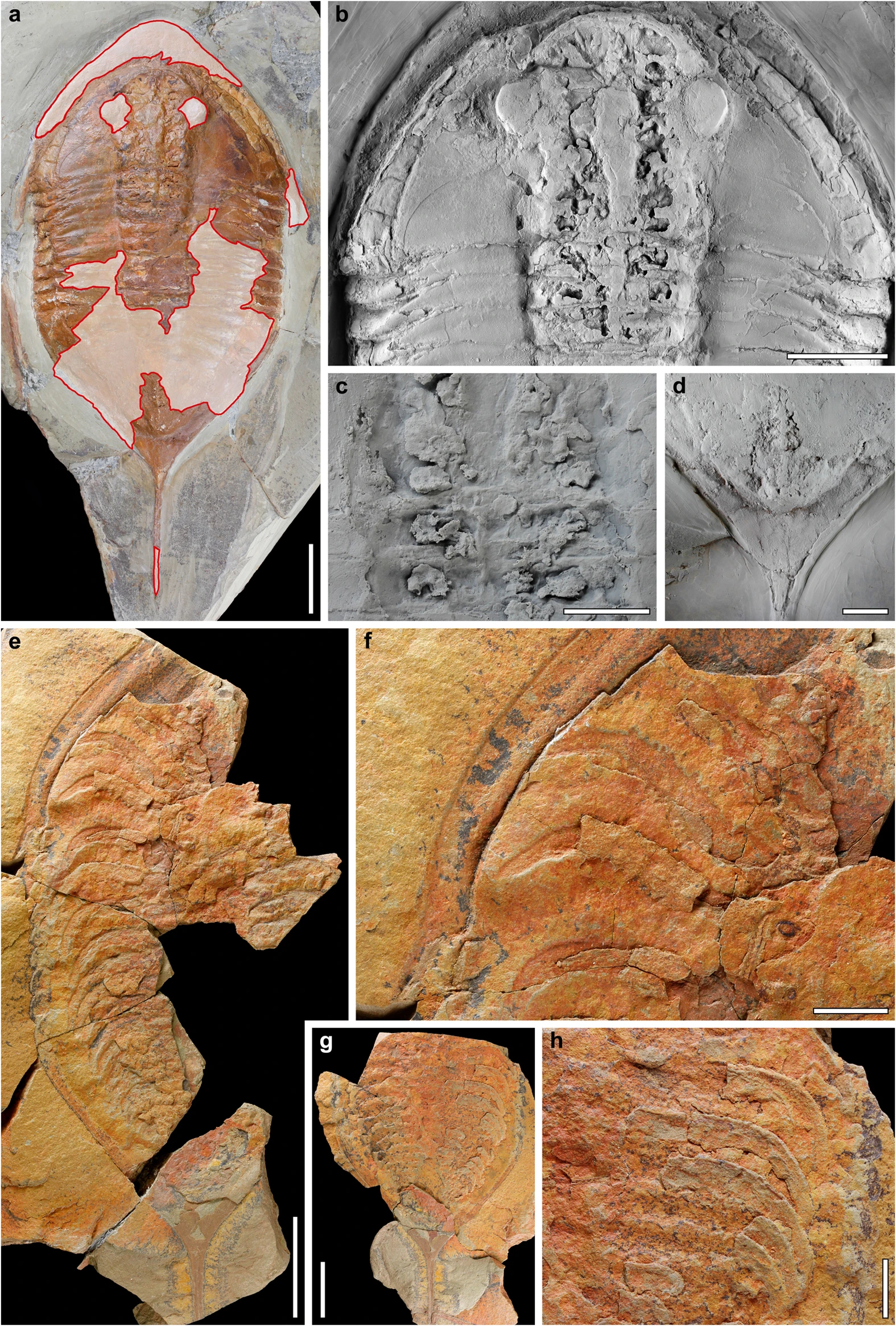
Fossils of M. (Ekeraspis) hammondi with soft-bodied preservation. (a-d) Specimen MGM-6755X, preserving digestive structures. (e-h) MGM-6756X, preserving a complete set of endopods

Another specimen of M. hammondi, MGM-6755X, preserves the digestive system. The alimentary canal of MGM-6755X consists of an 8-millimeter wide crop that extends from the anterior edge of the eyes to the end of the cephalon, tapering to 4 millimeters by the end. Following the crop is a 3-millimeter wide intestine that is preserved up to the third thoracic segment before reappearing for 22 millimeters before the axial end of the pygidium. There are two bilaterally symmetrical digestive caecae anterior to the crop that occupy the whole anterior region below the glabella. Behind the eyes are at least 4 additional pairs of lobed, laterally-oriented caecae with longitudinally aligned tips. The posterior caecae lengthen transversely as the crop tapers. The first three thoracic segments preserve digestive caecae similar in size and shape to the posteriormost cephalic pair. The alimentary canal may preserve three pairs of small and simple caecae posterior of the pygidial axis; however, the presence of caecae along the entire digestive tract is impossible to determine due to the quality of preservation and the fact that much of the specimen is restored. The crop and intestine are preserved with a positive relief, while the caecae are preserved as voids but were likely initially permineralized during early diagenesis, possibly due to being an enzymatically active region in life. The presence of both a crop (anatomy) and caecae suggests that M. (Ekeraspis) hammondi had a unique "type 3" digestive system (in contrast to the "type 1" digestive system defined by the presence of caecae but no crop and the "type 2" digestive system found in Isotelus and Birmanites defined by the presence of a crop but no caecae).

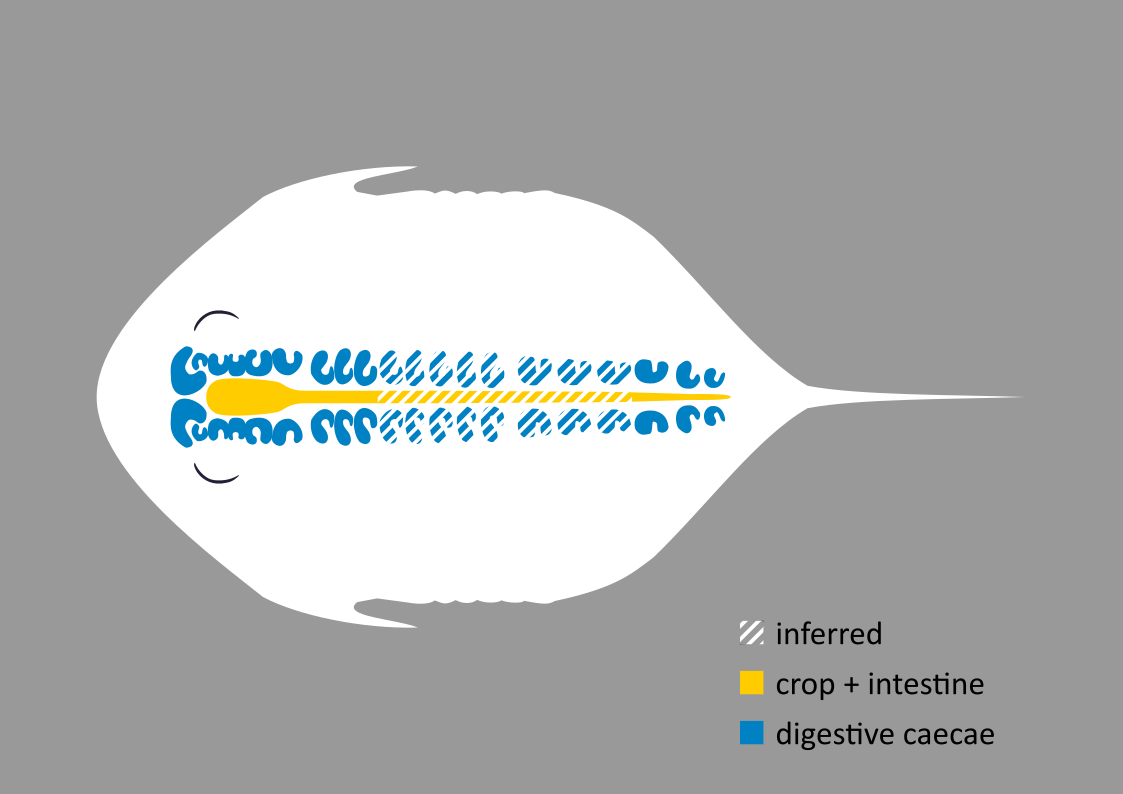
Digestive system of Megistaspis (Ekeraspis) hammondi with crop and intestine in yellow and digestive caecae in blue. Inferred parts have white scoring.

=== Ornamentation ===
The test of Megistaspis is generally smooth. Terracing exists only on the doublure (only on the base of the "snout" in forms like M. acuticauda with elongated snouts), the articular facets of the thorax and pygidium, and the genal spines, while light terracing may exist along the margins of the free cheeks and pygidium. However, small pits, which are indicated on the internal surface of the test by small tubercles, occur in all Megistaspis species (but are only preserved in cases where the test has not been weathered or corroded). The pits may be in close proximity to each other or widely spaced from each other depending on the species; in addition, the pits are not always evenly spread across the test and may be crowded around the borders of the test but widely spaced closer to the central regions. In some cases, the pits may be of two different sizes, and in these cases, the smaller pits form a background. Below the surface of the test is a perfectly smooth lamella which can be observed in specimens where the surface of the test is peeled off. The pits are clearly visible on the lamella and can also be seen on the mold if the sediment is fine enough to preserve almost microscopic details.

In some preserved pygidia with a weathered test, fine striations can be seen diverging forwards and outwards to the dorsal furrow, where they suddenly turn outwards and somewhat backward. This structure is entirely independent of the relief of the pygidium, and the weak ribs in the posterior parts of the pygidium can be superseded by the striations. In the anterior ribs, the distal portion of the ribs behind the rib furrow may become diffuse and merge into the network created by the striae. The striations are preserved in both external and internal relief and can sometimes be preserved in an internal mold of the pygidium. The striations are also not restricted to the pygidium, being observed in cranidia of M. (Rhinoferus) lawrowi and M. (Megistaspidella) heros. These striations have been found in M. (Megistaspidella) heros, M. (Megistaspidella) acuticauda, M. (Megistaspidella) curvispina, and M. (Megistaspidella) gigas, but indications of them can be seen in other species and they likely exist in all species of Megistaspis and perhaps other asaphid genera.

== Paleobiology ==
=== Diet and trace production ===
The relief of the crop and intestine of M. (Ekeraspis) hammondi has the same texture and grain size as the matrix, suggesting active sediment ingestion or rapid sediment infill. This, combined with the slight heteropody of the cephalic appendages (where the cephalic limbs were slightly larger than the thoracic limbs) and the non-forked hypostome, suggests that M. (Ekeraspis) hammondi was a detritus feeder, a common mode of life for other benthic trilobites. The spinose cephalic appendages of M. (Ekeraspis) hammondi were likely used to dig for food in a comb-like motion. This behavior would have produced Cruziana rugosa traces, which were pascichnia (combined feeding and locomotion traces) associated with the food searching strategy of asaphoid trilobites. In addition, Cruziana rugosa traces could have reached 26 centimeters wide, which is only consistent with large asaphoid trilobites like M. (Ekeraspis) hammondi and Ogyginus, the latter of which are frequently found in association with Cruziana rugosa traces.

M. (Ekeraspis) hammondi may have also produced resting traces similar to Rusophycus carleyi and Rusophycus morgoti, molting burrows that were previously interpreted as predation traces. The fine, backward-oriented crests of these Rusophycus have been attributed to spines on the endopods, and the trace-makers have non-forked hypostomes. These traces have been assigned to Ogyginus and Asaphellus, but M. (Ekeraspis) hammondi may have produced similar resting traces other than the long terminal spine, which could have been directed slightly upwards in life.

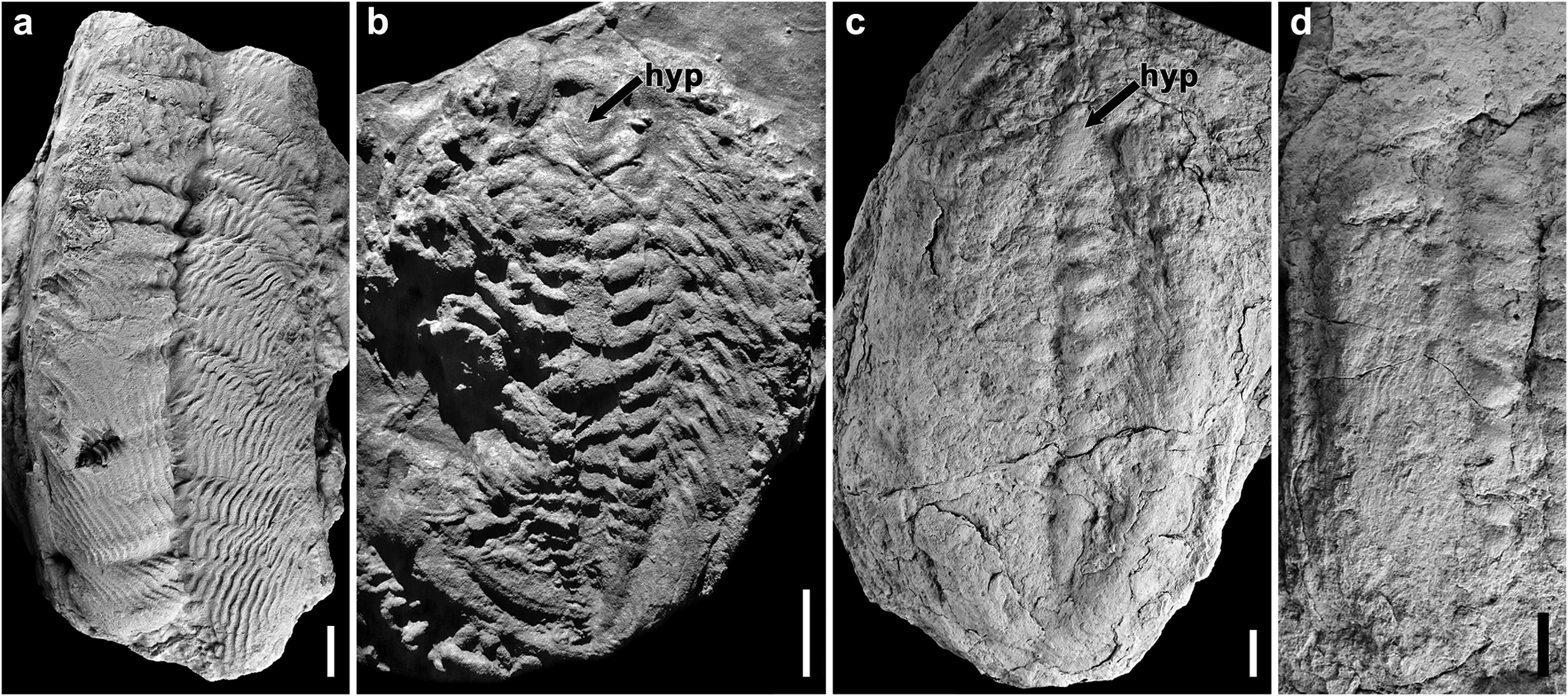
Various trace fossils attributed to asaphid trilobites. (a) Cruziana rugosa from the early Dapingian of Argentina, specimen MGM-6760X (b) Rusophycus morgati from the Floian of France, specimen IGR-114954 (c–d) Rusophycus carleyi from the Floian-stage Upper Fezouata Formation of Morocco, locally associated with the trackmaker Asaphellus, (c) specimen MGM-6759X, (d) specimen MGM-6758X.

However, M. (Rhinoferus) gibba has an anteriorly inflated glabella which has been suggested to facilitate the predation or scavenging of larger prey. While the hypostome of M. (Rhinoferus) gibba is currently unknown, its discovery could elucidate the ecological significance of an anteriorly inflated glabella. The hypostome of M. (Rhinoferus) hyorrhina is not drastically different from that of other species of Megistaspis, but it has the median notch characteristic of M. (Megistaspis) rather than the median point of M. (Megistaspidella). However, the glabellar swelling of M. (Rhinoferus) hyorrhina occurs not on the anterior of the glabella but on the posteriormost lobe of the glabella behind the glabellar tubercule.

=== Burrowing and sensation ===
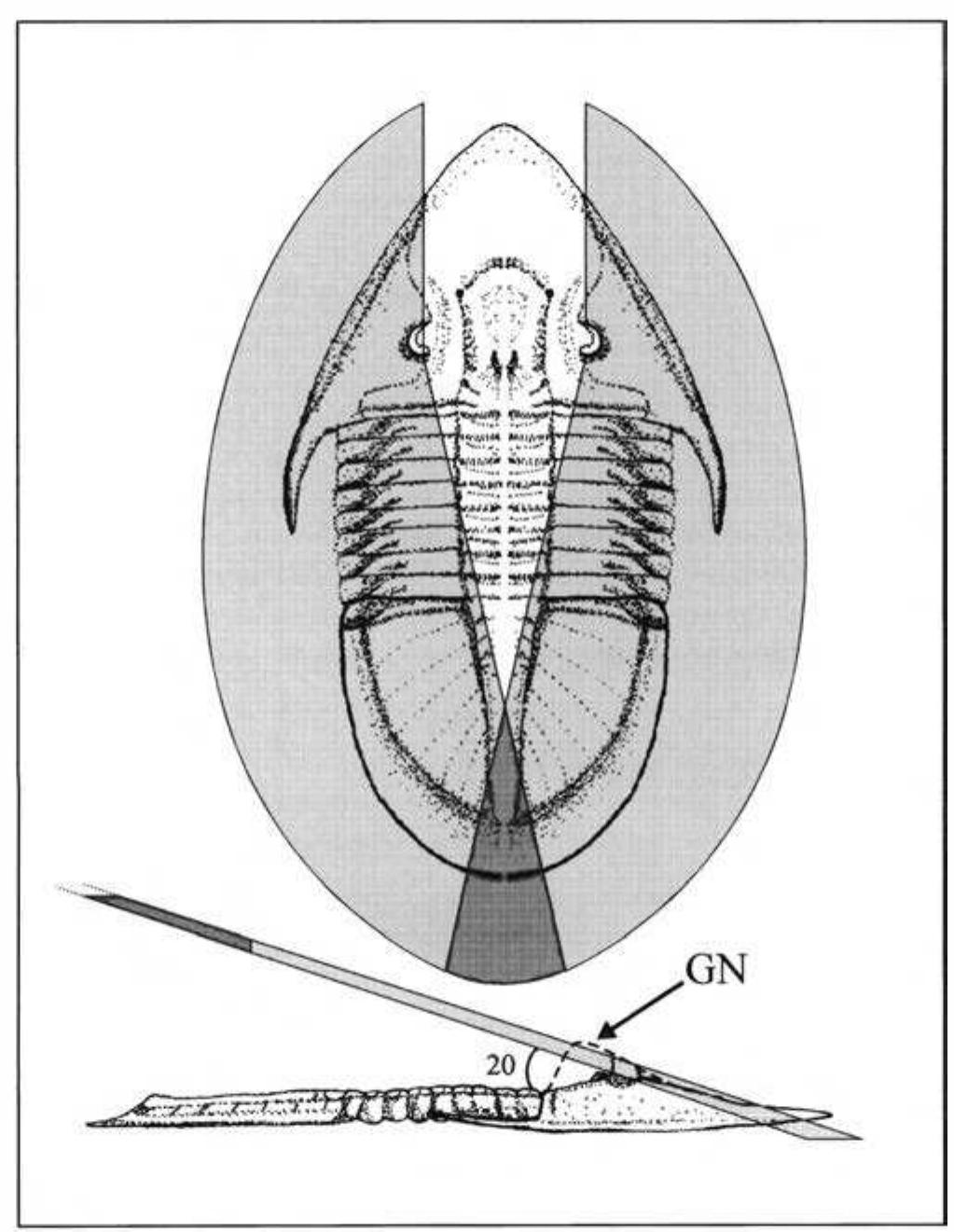
Dorsal and lateral reconstruction of the visual field of Megistaspis (Rhinoferus) hyorrhina based on PMO 162.658–659. Darker colour indicates overlapping fields. The dotted line marked GN is the outline of the glabella in the most swollen specimens.

M. (Rhinoferus) hyorrhina has been suggested to have a shallow infaunal life habit, where it would burrow just below the sediment. This observation is supported by its flattened exoskeleton, elevated holochroal eyes, and the large glabellar node (a swelling on the posteriormost lobe of the glabella). The glabellar tubercule may have acted as a pressure-sensitive organ in asaphid trilobites, and the inflated glabellar node may have served to elevate this organ above the sediment, allowing M. (Rhinoferus) hyorrhina to detect pressure changes even when burrowing. The eyes are strongly elevated, and like most other asaphid trilobites, M. (Rhinoferus) hyorrhina has a strongly restricted visual field. In 2002, Hoel and Høyberget estimated that the visual field of each eye covered about 195°, from a point straight in front of the eye to a point behind the rear of the body. Consequently, the visual fields of the left and right eye would have overlapped at the rear of the body, while a zone directly in front of the body could not be seen by either eye. Vertically, the visual field covers a narrow band sloping backward and upwards at a 20° angle above the horizontal.

=== Cuticular thickness and molting ===
In Norwegian specimens of M. (Rhinoferus) hyorrhina, the pygidia are frequently flattened more than the cranidia. While this was suggested to mean that the specimens were newly molted, two specimens only consisting of a pygidium and five thoracic segments, that are probably shed exuviae, are flattened to the same degree as the other Norwegian pygidia. This may suggest that the cuticle of the cranidium was thicker and more robust than that of the pygidium in life.

The two specimens of M. (Rhinoferus) hyorrhina consisting of a pygidium and five thoracic segments, along with a specimen of M. (Megistaspidella) triangularis consisting of a pygidium and five thoracic segments that was collected by Magne Høyberget from the same beds, may suggest that during molting, the pygidium and posterior five thoracic segments separated as a unit from the anterior parts, which were shed somewhere else. In addition, the suture between the third and fourth thoracic segments may have been a constant zone of weakness. However, Hoel and Høyberget warn against generalizing based on so few specimens.

=== Ecological variations ===
Many characters of Megistaspis, including the width of the test, the convexity of the shell, the depth of furrows, and the development of the pygidial rim are affected by the environment. For instance, the pygidial length-with ratio of adult species of Megistaspis may vary around 15–20% in individual ecosystems but may total 30% or more (40% in M. (Megistaspidella) acuticauda) across all members of a species. Shallow-water species (like M. (Paramegistaspis) planilimbata and M. (Megistaspis)) tend to be narrower with a faint posterior border furrow on the cephalon while deeper-water species that dwell on muddy substrate like M. (Paramegistaspis) estonica tend to have broader tests and lack posterior border furrows.

=== Pathologies ===
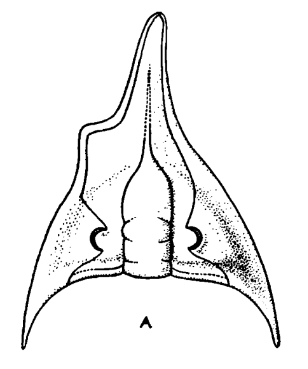
Pathological cephalon of Megistaspis acuticauda Angelin, 1854 showing tumor on left side and deformation of anterior section of facial suture

A specimen of Megistaspis (Megistaspidella) acuticauda from the Baltic region notably displays a tumor on the left side of the cephalon and a "corresponding deformation of the anterior facial suture." In addition, a specimen of M. (Paramegistaspis) planilimbata cyclopyge from Montana shows a scarred glabella, likely due to parasitism.

==== Boring organisms ====
Megistaspis exuviae from the Vaginatum limestone are rapidly destroyed by seawater and boring organisms if they are not buried immediately after molting. The surfaces of eroded tests frequently bear branching, winding, and anastomosing ridges with a semicircular cross-section without any structures like pores or striations. These ridges are never seen in specimens with smooth tests and likely contributed to the destruction of the shell. While the organism that produced these tubes may never be discovered, a colony of bryozoans has also been seen on a heavily eroded specimen, proving that the bioerosion was caused by an organism contemporaneous with Megistaspis.

== Species ==
- Megistaspis ringsakerensis Skjeseth, 1952
- Megistaspis knyrkoi Schmidt, 1906

Subgenus Megistaspis (Megistaspis) Jaanusson, 1956

This subgenus is characterized by a triangular cephalon and pygidium, a notched hypostome, a glabella with lateral grooves, basal lobes and occipital lobes, a convex rachis and pleurae, the presence of a postmarginal furrow, and a pygidial rim that widens slightly towards the posterior end of the pygidium.

- Type species Megistaspis (Megistaspis) limbata Boeck, 1838 – Volkhov stage of Norway, Sweden, and Russia
  - Megistaspis (Megistaspis) limbata baltica Balashova, 1976 – Volkhov stage of the Baltics
- Megistaspis (Megistaspis) elongata Schmidt, 1906 – Kunda stage of Norway and Sweden
- Megistaspis (Megistaspis) geminus Nielsen, 1995 – Volkhov stage of Sweden
- Megistaspis (Megistaspis) ingeriensis Jaanusson, 1956 – Volkhov stage of the Baltics
- Megistaspis (Megistaspis) lepikuensis Jaanusson, 1956 – Arenig of Russia and Estonia
- Megistaspis (Megistaspis) lawae Schmidt, 1906 – Volkhov stage of the Baltics
- Megistaspis (Megistaspis) planilimbata Angelin, 1851 – Latorp stage
- Megistaspis (Megistaspis) polyphemus Brögger, 1882 – Volkhov stage of Norway and Sweden
- Megistaspis (?Megistaspis) similis Burskij, 1970
- Megistaspis (Megistaspis) simon Tjernvik and Johansson, 1980 – Volkhov stage of Sweden

Subgenus Megistaspis (Megistaspidella) Jaanusson, 1956

This subgenus is characterized by a triangular and elongated cephalon, a subparabolic or triangular pygidium which may be pointed or bear a small terminal spine, an unsegmented glabella, and a relatively flat thoracic rachis.

- Type species Megistaspis (Megistaspidella) extenuatus Sars, 1835 – Norway
- Megistaspis (Megistaspidella) acuticauda Angelin, 1854 – Lower Ordovician of Sweden
- Megistaspis (Megistaspidella) convexa Bohlin, 1960 – Lower Ordovician of Sweden
- Megistaspis (Megistaspidella) curvispina Bohlin, 1960 – Lower Ordovician of Sweden
- Megistaspis (Megistaspidella) bombifrons Bohlin, 1960 – Lower Ordovician of Sweden
- Megistaspis (Megistaspidella) gigas Angelin, 1854 – Lower Ordovician of Sweden
- Megistaspis (Megistaspidella) giganteus Wandås, 1983 – Llanvirn of Norway
- Megistaspis (Megistaspidella) grandis Sars, 1835 – Norway
- Megistaspis (Megistaspidella) isvosica Balashova, 1976
- Megistaspis (?Megistaspidella) laine Jaanusson, 1956 – Volkhov stage of Sweden
- Megistaspis (Megistaspidella) lamanskii Schmidt, 1906
- Megistaspis (Megistaspidella) longa Balashova, 1976
- Megistaspis (Megistaspidella) maximus Wandås, 1983 – Llanvirn of Norway
- Megistaspis (Megistaspidella) obtusicauda Bohlin, 1955 – Lower Ordovician of Sweden
- Megistaspis (Megistaspidella) obuchovenis Balashova, 1976
- Megistaspis (Megistaspidella) pseudorudis Balashova, 1976
- Megistaspis (Megistaspidella) pugiocauda Harrington and Leanza, 1957
- Megistaspis (Megistaspidella) saltaensis Kayser, 1898 – Lower Ordovician of Sweden
- Megistaspis (Megistaspidella) spinulata Bohlin, 1960 – Lower Ordovician of Sweden
- Megistaspis (Megistaspidella) triangularis Schmidt, 1906 – Lower Ordovician of Sweden
- Megistaspis (Megistaspidella) heroica Angelin, 1854 – Lower Ordovician of Sweden
- Megistaspis (Megistaspidella) heros Dalman, 1828
- Megistaspis (Megistaspidella) laticauda Wandås, 1983 – Llanvirn of Norway

Subgenus Megistaspis (Paramegistaspis) Balashova, 1976

This subgenus is characterized by a semicircular cephalon, a semicircular or triangular pygidium, a gently notched hypostome, a glabella without lateral grooves, basal lobes and occipital lobes, a slightly convex rachis and pleurae, an unpronounced postmarginal furrow, and a pygidial rim that widens slightly towards the midpoint of the lateral margin pygidium.

- Type species Megistaspis (Paramegistaspis) planilimbata Angelin, 1851 – Tremadocian of Sweden
  - Megistaspis (Paramegistaspis) planilimbata cyclopyge Harrington, 1938- Lower Ordovician of Montana, USA and Argentina
- Megistaspis (Paramegistaspis) estonica Tjernvik, 1956 – Arenig of Russia, Estonia, and Sweden
- Megistaspis (Paramegistaspis) leuchtenbergi Lamansky, 1905 – Tremadoc of Russia
- Megistaspis (Paramegistaspis) norvegica Tjernvik, 1956 – Arenig of Norway and Sweden
- Megistaspis (Paramegistaspis) popovkiensis Balashova, 1966 – Early Ordovician of Russia
- Megistaspis (Paramegistaspis) putilovensis Balashova, 1966 – Arenig of Russia
- Megistaspis (Paramegistaspis) scutata Tjernvik, 1956 – Arenig of Sweden

Subgenus Megistaspis (Rhinoferus) Balashova, 1976

This subgenus is characterized by a triangular cephalon, a rounded pygidium which may or may not bear a short spine, a gently notched hypostome, a convex glabella with swellings of varying size in front of the occipital lobes, and eyes located far from the posterior margin of the cephalon.

- Type species Megistaspis (Rhinoferus) hyorrhina Leuchtenberg, 1843 – Baltics, Norway and Sweden
  - Megistaspis (Rhinoferus) hyorrhina var. typica Leuchtenberg, 1843 – Norway
  - Megistaspis (Rhinoferus) ?hyorrhina var. kolenkoi Schmidt, 1906 – Norway
  - Megistaspis (Rhinoferus) ?hyorrhina var. mickwitzi Schmidt, 1898 – Norway
  - Megistaspis (Rhinoferus) ?hyorrhina var. stacyi Schmidt, 1906 – Norway
- Megistaspis (Rhinoferus) explanata Angelin, 1851
- Megistaspis (Rhinoferus) gibba Schmidt, 1904
- Megistaspis (Rhinoferus) lawrowi Schmidt, 1906 – Lower Ordovician of Russia and Sweden
- Megistaspis (Rhinoferus) petrowtschinensis Balashova, 1976
- ?Megistaspis (?Rhinoferus) pogrebowi Balashova, 1966

Subgenus Megistaspis (Ekeraspis) Tjernvik, 1956

This subgenus is characterized by a cephalon with long genal spines, a subtriangular pygidium with a long terminal spine, a short hypostome with a rounded posterior margin, a glabella without lateral grooves and occipital lobes, a convex rachis and pleurae, a wide and deep postmarginal furrow, and a narrow rhachis.

- Type species Megistaspis (Ekeraspis) armata Tjernvik, 1956 – Arenig (Floian) of Norway and Sweden
- Megistaspis (Ekeraspis) euclides Walcott, 1925 – Tremadoc of Tasmania, Australia and British Columbia, Canada
- Megistaspis (Ekeraspis) filacovi Bergeron, 1889
  - Megistaspis (Ekeraspis) filacovi filacovi Bergeron, 1889 – Lower Ordovician of the Montagne Noire, France
  - Megistaspis (Ekeraspis) filacovi bergeroni Thoral – Lower Ordovician of the Montagne Noire, France
- Megistaspis (Ekeraspis) floweri Ross, 1970 – Tulean (late Tremadocian – early Floian) of Nevada, USA
- Megistaspis (Ekeraspis) gladiator Fritsch, 1901 – Arenig of Germany
- Megistaspis (Ekeraspis) hammondi Brögger, 1882 – Tremadocian of Morocco
- Megistaspis (Ekeraspis) heroides Brögger, 1882 – Arenig of Norway and Sweden
- Megistaspis (Ekeraspis) nevadaensis Ross, 1970 – Stairsian (Tremadocian) of Nevada, USA
- Megistaspis (Ekeraspis) roquebrunensis Courtessole, Pillet, and Vizcaïno 1985 – Montagne Noire, France

=== Distribution ===
While most species of Megistaspis were concentrated in the temperate waters of Baltoscandia, in particular Norway, Sweden, Estonia, and Russia, members of the subgenus M. (Ekeraspis) have a wider distribution, being found in temperate regions like Norway and Sweden (M. (Ekeraspis) armata and M. (Ekeraspis) heroides), Germany (M. (Ekeraspis) gladiator, and France (M. (Ekeraspis) filacovi and M. (Ekeraspis) roquebrunensis); tropical regions like Nevada (M. (Ekeraspis) floweri) and Tasmania (M. (Ekeraspis) euclides); and polar regions like Morocco (M. (Ekeraspis) hammondi).

== Biostratigraphy ==
The genus Megistaspis is one of the four most common genera in the Komstad limestone of Sweden, (the others being Nileus, Symphysurus, and Geragnostus), and its abundance and diversity allows it to be used as an index fossil for several biozones (rock layers defined by the presence of a certain species of index fossil) of Scandinavia and Estonia.

Megistaspis species act as index fossils for the following biozones in Scandinavia:

- the M. (Ekeraspis) armata, M. (Paramegistaspis) planilimbata, and M. aff. (Paramegistaspis) estonica zones of the Ottenbyan stage.
- the M. (Paramegistaspis) estonica zone of the Billingenian stage.
- the M. (Megistaspis) polyphemus, M. (Megistaspis) simon, and M. (Megistaspis) limbata zones of the Volkhovian stage.
- the M. (Megistaspidella) gigas-M. (Megistaspidella) obtusicauda zone of the Kundan stage.

Ordovician trilobite biostratigraphy of Scandinavia according to Nielsen et al., 2023:
← / Ceratopyge forficula; ← / Ceratopyge acicularis
