= Isopodichnus =

Isopodichnus Temporal range: 221.5-205.6 Ma

Trace fossil classification
- Domain: Eukaryota
- Kingdom: Animalia
- Phylum: Arthropoda
- Class: Malacostraca
- Order: Isopoda (?)
- Ichnogenus: †Isopodichnus; Bornemann 1889

Ichnospecies
- †Isopodichnus queenslandensis Cook & Bann, 2000

Trace fossil

Isopodichnus is an ichnogenus of trace fossil. Ribbon-like in form, Isopodichnus traces were likely formed by the activity of an isopod crustacean foraging within the preserved sediment. Parallel to the bedding plane, a central furrow is flanked by two hypichnial ridges. Trails may also exhibit scratch marks and be associated with Rusophycus-like resting traces. Isopodichnus are very similar in form to Cruziana traces, making delineation of the two forms difficult, and controversial.

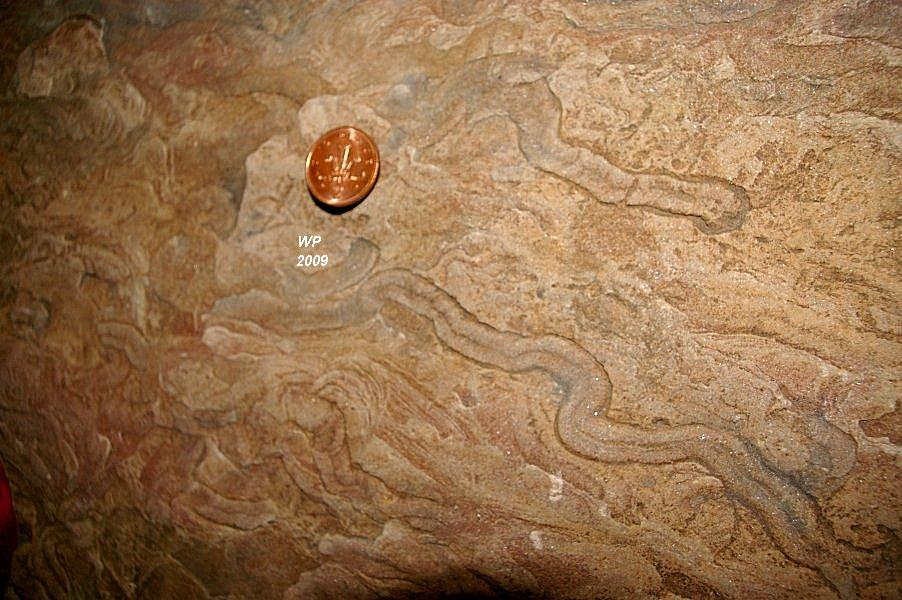
Isopodichnus trace fossil from the upper carboniferous - (Scotland, St Monans, Fife) (two penny piece for scale)

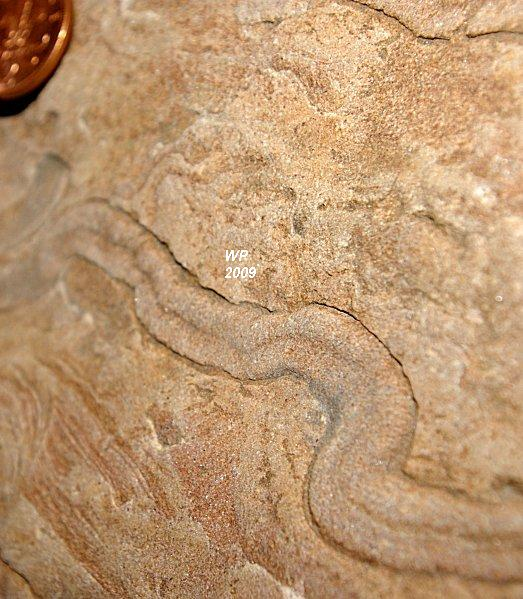
Close up

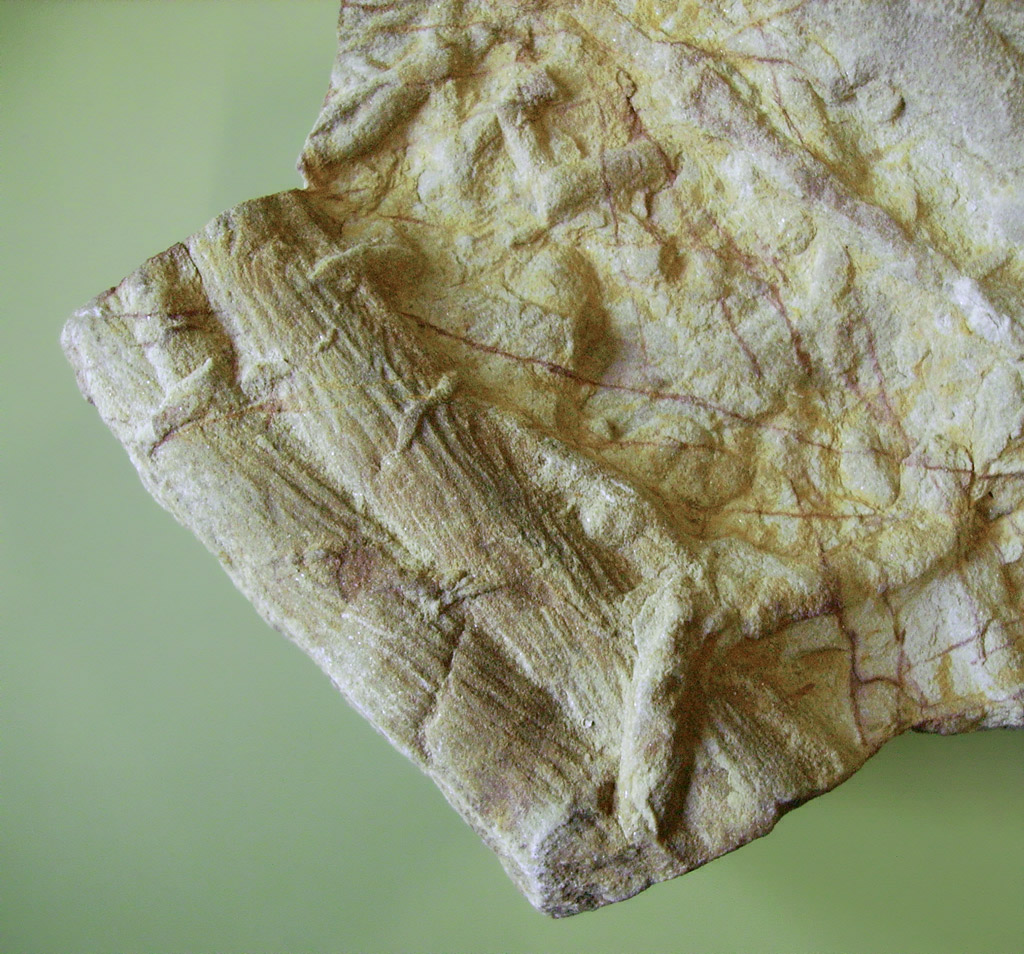
Cruziana trace, possibly formed by a Trilobite.

== See also ==
- Cruziana
- Ichnology
- Trace fossil
