= Folkeslunda Limestone =

Limestone and mudstone formation

- Stratigraphic range: Darriwilian (Lasnamägi); 463.5–460.9 Ma
- Type: Formation
- Underlies: Furudal Limestone
- Overlies: Seby Limestone
- Thickness: 0.99–3.51 m (3.2–11.5 ft)

Lithology
- Primary: Calcarenitic limestone
- Other: Mudstone

Location
- Coordinates: 58.0°N 15.0°E
- Approximate paleocoordinates: 36.0°S 8.3°W
- Region: In situ: Dalarna, Jämtland, Öland & Östergötland; Ex situ: Mecklenburg-Vorpommern, Lubusz & Kuyavia-Pomerania
- Country: Sweden; Ex situ: Germany; Poland
- Extent: Patches from Jämtland (N) via Siljan (C) to Öland (SE)

Type section
- Named for: Folkeslunda, Öland
- Named by: Jaanusson
- Location: Långlöt & Runsten, Öland
- Year defined: 1960
- Coordinates: 56°43′38.4″N 16°43′01.9″E
- Folkeslunda Limestone (Sweden)

The Folkeslunda Limestone is a thin limestone and mudstone geologic formation of Sweden. The formation crops out on the island of Öland to the east of Kalmar, where Folkeslunda is located. Other exposures of the formation are in Dalarna, Jämtland and Östergötland. The Folkeslunda Limestone was deposited in an open marine environment with an estimated water depth of 150 to 200 metres (490 to 660 ft) in a eustatically transgressive phase.

The formation preserves fossils dating back to the late Darriwilian (Lasnamägi stage in the regional stratigraphy) of the Middle Ordovician period, dating to 463.5 to 460.9 Ma. Several genera of nautiloids, trilobites, brachiopods and ostracods were found in the maximum 3.51 metres (11.5 ft) thick formation.

Erratic blocks of the same formation are also found in Germany (Mecklenburg-Vorpommern) and along the Vistula River in Bydgoszcz and in Żary, Lower Silesia, Poland.

== Description ==
Ordovician sedimentary rocks are exposed in patches across the southern half of Sweden. The northernmost exposure is surrounding the Siljan Ring, a Devonian impact crater in Dalarna. Other outcrops are found west and south of Örebro, northeast of Livköping, west and southwest of Skövde and surrounding Falköping. Underlying the Granby crater, west of Linköping, the Ordovician has a larger exposure. The southernmost Ordovician outcrops are situated in Skåne, due east of Lund and at the southeastern tip of Sweden.

Most of the island of Öland consists of Ordovician sediments, where Folkeslunda is located, the namesake for the formation. Previous names for the formation were Upper Grey Orthoceratite Limestone, Chiron Limestone, Centaurus Limestone and Schroeteri Limestone (lower part). The type section is located in the southeastern part of the parish of Långlöt and the northeastern part of the parish of Runsten on Öland. The best section of the unit on Öland is in a quarry close to the road from Vedby to Bäcklunda, east of Hornsjön.

The formation is the uppermost unit in the traditional Orthoceras Limestone of Sweden, overlying the Seby Limestone and the Folkesunda Limestone is overlain by the Furudal Limestone. The Folkeslunda Limestone dates to the Lasnamägi stage, part of the Purtse, belonging to the Virunian in the regional stratigraphy of Sweden, corresponding to a late Darriwilian age of the Middle Ordovician.

The unit is 2 metres (6.6 ft) thick in the Vikarby section and 2.6 metres (8.5 ft) thick in the Kårgärde section of the western Siljan Ring. In the Lunne section of Jämtland the unit is between 0.99 and 3.51 metres (3.2 and 11.5 ft) thick.

== Lithologies ==
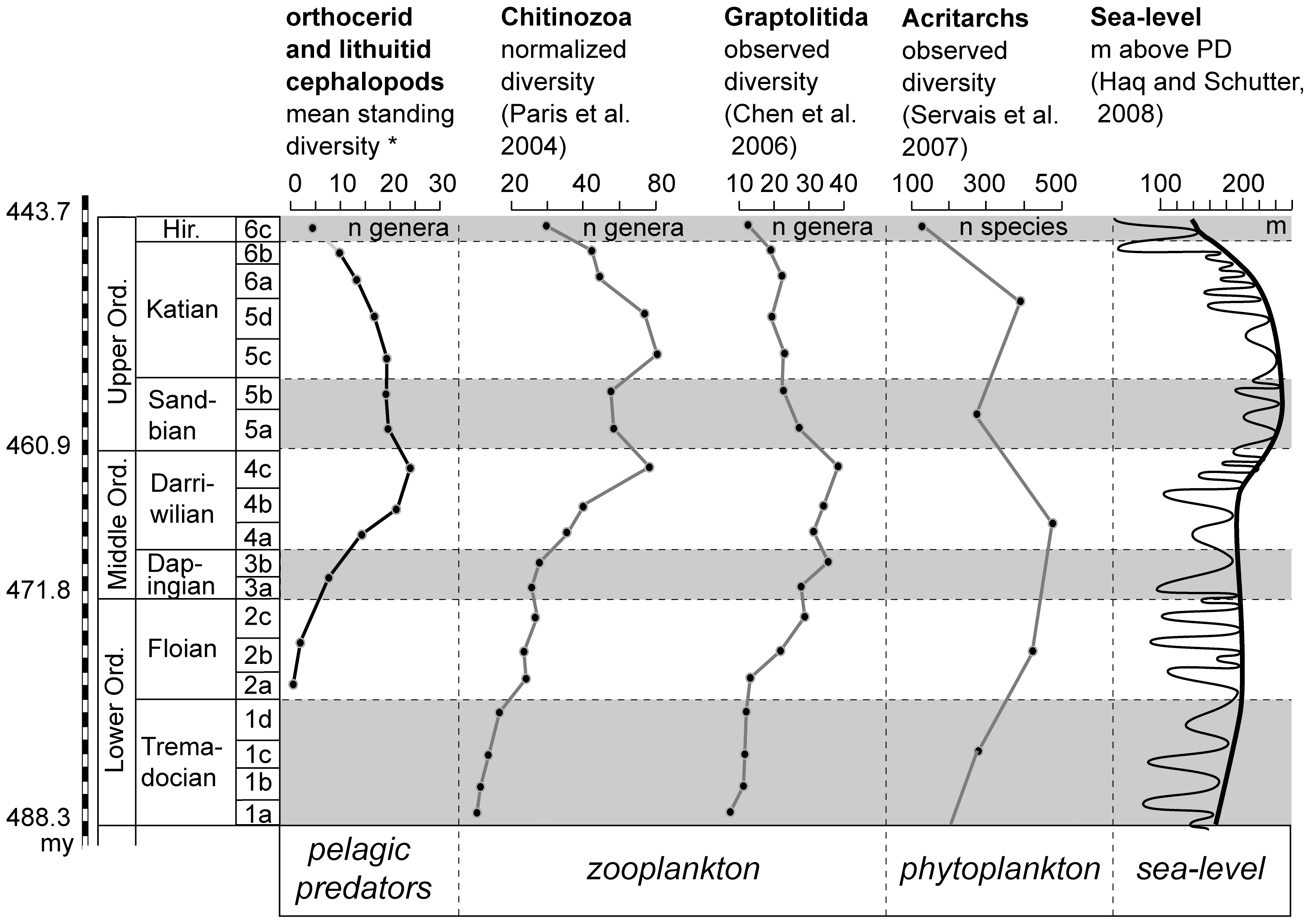
Eustatic sea level of the Ordovician

The base of the formation is formed by a 15 centimetres (5.9 in) thick grey calcarenitic limestone bed, which is overlain by thin-bedded calcarenitic and calcilutitic limestones. The upper half of the formation consists of thick-bedded calcarenitic limestones. In Kårgärde, the formation comprises medium-bedded, coarse-grained, grey to dark grey limestones with chamositic grains in some beds. Other parts of the formation contain finely nodular lime mudstones and mudstones, and thick-bedded, coarse grained, in part coquinoid grey to dark grey limestones.

The depositional environment of the limestone has been interpreted as reef platform facies. The eustatic sea level change globally during deposition of the Folkeslunda Limestone was a transgression, and based on the low implosion rate of fossil shells during fossilization, the water depth at time of deposition of the Folkeslunda Limestone has been estimated at 150 to 200 metres (490 to 660 ft).

== Erratic boulders ==
Erratic boulders belonging to the formation have been found in Mecklenburg-Vorpommern, Germany and Lubusz and Kuyavia-Pomerania, Poland. The German boulder was described by Schlotheim (1820) and Boll (1857). Boll's collection is fortunately preserved at the regional Müritz Museum of Waren, Mecklenburg. Dzik (1984) described and illustrated Ordovician nautiloids of the erratic boulders in Poland.

== Paleontology ==
With respect to both fauna and lithology, the unit in the Siljan District resembles its development on Öland. The fauna shares many common species with the Seby Limestone, but is also distinct with respect to the cephalopods and hyolithids. Faunal differences with respect to the underlying formation were notes in the phosphatic brachiopod fauna, although the dominant species is the same as in the Seby Limestone. Trilobites from the Folkeslunda Limestone were described by Holm (1883) and Törnquist (1884), while Janusson (1957) described ostracods. Species of nautiloid cephalopods were reported by Holm in 1896, Troedsson (1931, 1932), and Kröger (2004). Biostratigraphically, the Folkeslunda Limestone spans the Pygodus serra conodont zone and the Eoplacoghnathus reclinatus subzone.

=== Correlations ===
The Eoplacoghnathus reclinatus subzone extends from the lowermost part of the Folkeslunda Limestone into the lower part of the Furudal Limestone. The subzone index species is not common outside Baltoscandia but has been recorded from a few localities in eastern North America (Bergström 1973), Argentina (Albanesi & Ortega 2002), and China (Zhang 1998).

=== Fossil content ===
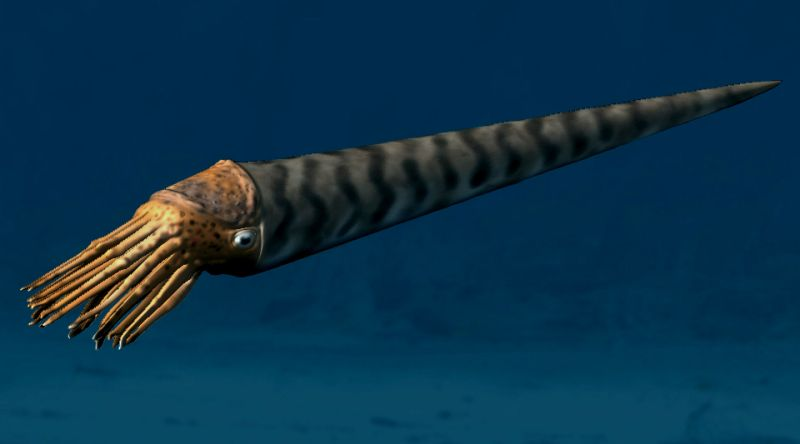
Interpretation of Orthoceras

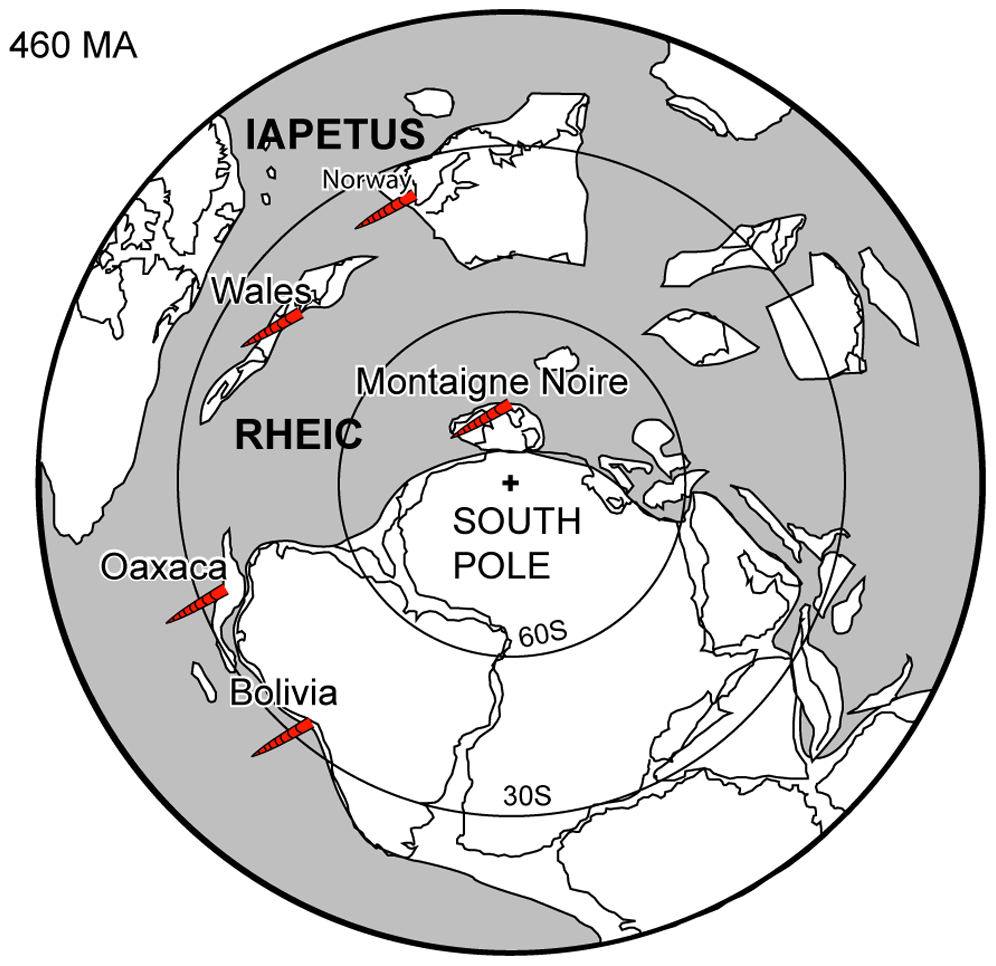
Paleogeography of the late Middle Ordovician. The Folkeslunda Limestone was deposited around 30°S

The following fossils have been found in the rocks belonging to the formation:

Group	Genus	Species	Location	Status	Notes
Cephalopods	Archigeisonoceras	A. folkeslundense	Öland	In situ	
Cephalopods	Arionoceras	A. lotskirkense	Löts Kyrka, Öland	In situ	
Cephalopods	Arionoceras	A. lotskirkense	Mecklenburg-Vorpommern	Erratic block	
Cephalopods	Bactroceras	B. angustisiphonatum	Mecklenburg-Vorpommern	Erratic block	
Cephalopods	Cyrtendoceras	C. hircus	Öland	In situ	
Cephalopods	Nilssonoceras	N. latisiphonatum	Öland	In situ	
Cephalopods	Orthoceras	O. bifoveatum	Öland	In situ	
Cephalopods	Orthoceras	O. regulare	Öland	In situ	
Cephalopods	Orthoceras	O. scabridum	Södra Bäck, Öland	In situ	
Cephalopods	Oonoceras	O. priscum	Vistula River, Bydgoszcz	Erratic block	
Cephalopods	Phthanoncoceras	P. ellipticum	Lerkaka, Kalmar	In situ	
Cephalopods	Phthanoncoceras	P. ellipticum	Vistula River, Bydgoszcz	Erratic block	
Cephalopods	Phthanoncoceras	P. ellipticum	Żary, Lower Silesia	Erratic block	
Cephalopods	Plagiostomoceras	P. fragile	Böda, Stora Mossen, Öland	In situ	
Cephalopods	Polygrammoceras	P. oelandicum	Folkeslunda, Öland	In situ	
Cephalopods	Richardsonoceras	R. gerhardi	Lerkaka, Kalmar	In situ	
Cephalopods	Troedssonella	T. endoceroides	Öland	In situ	
Cephalopods	Clinoceras	sp.	Vistula River, Bydgoszcz	Erratic block	
Cephalopods	Cochlioceras	sp.	Sjöstorp, Öland	In situ	
Cephalopods	Cochlioceras	sp.	Vistula River, Bydgoszcz	Erratic block	
Cephalopods	Cochlioceras	sp.	Żary, Lower Silesia	Erratic block	
Cephalopods	Lituites	sp.	Kårgärde, Dalarna	In situ	
Trilobites	Illaenus	I. chiron	Kårgärde, Dalarna	In situ	
Trilobites	Pseudoasaphus	P. aciculatus	Kårgärde, Dalarna	In situ	
Trilobites	Pseudobasilicus	P. ?brachyrachis	Kårgärde, Dalarna	In situ	
Trilobites	Plectasaphus	P. plicicostis	Kårgärde, Dalarna	In situ	
Trilobites	Pseudomegalaspis	P. patagiata	Kårgärde, Dalarna	In situ	
Trilobites	Ampyx (Cnemidopyge)	sp.	Kårgärde, Dalarna	In situ	
Trilobites	Asaphus	sp.	Żary, Lower Silesia	Erratic block	
Trilobites	?Lonchodomas	sp.	Żary, Lower Silesia	Erratic block	
Trilobites	Nileus	sp.	Kårgärde, Dalarna	In situ	
Trilobites	Remopleurides	sp.	Östergötland	In situ	
Trilobites	Remopleurides	sp.	Kårgärde, Dalarna	In situ	
Gastropods	Eccyliopterus	E. alatus	Lerkaka, Kalmar	In situ	
Gastropods	Eccyliopterus	E. declivis	Lerkaka, Kalmar	In situ	
Gastropods	Pararaphistoma	P. vaginati	Lerkaka, Kalmar	In situ	
Gastropods	Sinuites	S. vetustus	Lerkaka, Kalmar	In situ	
Ostracods	Euprimites	E. bursa	Kårgärde, Dalarna	In situ	
Ostracods	Euprimites	E. effusus	Kårgärde, Dalarna	In situ	
Ostracods	Steusloffia	S. linnarssoni	Kårgärde, Dalarna	In situ	
Ostracods	Laccochilina	sp.	Östergötland	In situ	
Ostracods	Laccochilina	sp.	Kårgärde, Dalarna	In situ	
Ostracods	Sigmobolbina	sp.	Östergötland	In situ	
Lingulata	Biernatia	B. holmi	Kårgärde, Dalarna	In situ	
Lingulata	Conotreta	C. mica	Kårgärde, Dalarna	In situ	
Lingulata	Conotreta	C. siljanensis	Kårgärde, Dalarna	In situ	
Lingulata	Eoconulus	E. cf. clivosus	Kårgärde, Dalarna	In situ	
Lingulata	Eoconulus	E. robustus	Kårgärde, Dalarna	In situ	
Lingulata	Hisingerella	H. unguicula	Kårgärde, Dalarna	In situ	
Lingulata	Myotreta	M. dalecarlica	Kårgärde, Dalarna	In situ	
Lingulata	Rowellella	R. cf. lamellosa	Kårgärde, Dalarna	In situ	
Lingulata	Scaphelasma	S. mica	Kårgärde, Dalarna	In situ	
Lingulata	Spinilingula	S. radiolamellosa	Kårgärde, Dalarna	In situ	
Lingulata	Talasotreta	T. deformis	Kårgärde, Dalarna	In situ	
Lingulata	Cyrtonotreta	sp.	Kårgärde, Dalarna	In situ	
Lingulata	Paterula	sp.	Kårgärde, Dalarna	In situ	
Lingulata	Spondylotreta	sp.	Kårgärde, Dalarna	In situ	
Lingulata	Lingulellinae	indet.	Kårgärde, Dalarna	In situ	
Lingulata	Orbiculoideinae	indet.	Kårgärde, Dalarna	In situ	
Rhynchonellata	Nicolella	sp.	Östergötland	In situ	
Strophomenata	Christiania	sp.	Kårgärde, Dalarna	In situ	

== See also ==
- List of fossiliferous stratigraphic units in Sweden
- Alum Shale Formation, Scandinavia
- Letná Formation, Czech Republic
- Fezouata Formation, Morocco
- San Juan Formation, Argentina
- Sella Formation, Bolivia
