= Köpinge Sandstone =

Geologic formation in Sweden

- Stratigraphic range: Latest early-middle late Campanian; ~80–75 Ma
- Type: Formation

Lithology
- Primary: Highly calcareous and glauconitic sandstone

Location
- Coordinates: 55.5°N 13.9°E
- Approximate paleocoordinates: 45.7°N 14.3°W
- Region: Skåne
- Country: Sweden
- Extent: Localized outcrops in the Vomb Trough

Type section
- Named for: Köpingebro
- Köpinge Sandstone (Sweden)

The Köpinge Sandstone is a highly calcareous and glauconitic sandstone geologic formation of the Vomb Trough in Skåne, southernmost Sweden. The formation dates to the latest early to middle late Campanian stage of the Late Cretaceous and has provided fossils of ammonites, belemnites, the shark Cretalamna borealis and the mosasaurid Hainosaurus. Ex situ occurrences in Pleistocene deposits have provided a dorsal vertebra of a possible elasmosaurid.

== Description ==
The Köpinge Sandstone has been recorded from a number of small outcrops, the majority of which are not accessible today, northeast of the town of Ystad, around Köpingemolla, Svenstorp, Valleberga, Ingelstorp, Herrestad and Fredriksberg.

The formation comprises yellow highly calcareous and glauconitic sandstones and ranges in age (on the basis of abundant belemnites and ammonites) from the latest early Campanian to the middle late Campanian.

Christensen (1986) recorded two belemnite assemblages from the area, i.e., an older one comprising Belemnellocamax mammillatus and Belemnitella mucronata, and a younger one with B. mucronata and Belemnitella aff. langei. Ammonites (Gaudryceras sp., Pachydiscus haldemsis, Patagiosites stobaei, Nostoceras junior, Lewyites elegans, Baculites cf. aquilaensis, B. angustus, B. schlueteri, Trachyscaphites spiniger spiniger and Hoploscaphites ikorfatensis) from the Köpinge district indicate an early late Campanian age. The formation has also provided fossils of the mosasaurid Hainosaurus.

An isolated dorsal vertebra of a possible elasmosaurid was found in a Pleistocene Geschiebe, an ex situ occurrence of the Campanian formation, in southern Sweden.

The shark Cretalamna borealis recovered from the formation was described in 2015.

== See also ==
- List of fossiliferous stratigraphic units in Sweden
- Kristianstad Basin
- Folkeslunda Limestone, Ordovician fossiliferous formation of Sweden with ex situ fossil assemblages
