= Horns Kungsgård =

Nature preserve in Öland, Sweden

Coordinates: 57°11′35″N 16°55′56″E

- Interactive map of Horns Kungsgård
- Area: 946 hectares (2,340 acres; 3.65 sq mi) (78% on land)
- Established: 1979
- Website: visitoland.com/en/gora-pa-oland/horns-kungsgard-horns-crown-demesne/

Horns Kungsgård ("Horn's crown demesne") is a nature preserve in the northern part of Öland, Sweden. It was founded as a model farm by Gustav Vasa in the 1550s. It was incorporated in 1971 and expanded in 2001, and became one of the protected areas of the Natura 2000 network.

== History ==
The area has been farmed since the Iron Age, and remains of those farms can still be seen, including the farmers' stone walls. At Hornsjön are the remains of a fortified medieval manor. The original village of Degerhorn was emptied out by Gustav Vasa and the farmers forced out in the 1550s; in its stead he built a model farm which also produced for the royal stores at a time when the entire island was a royal hunting domain.

Horns Kungsgård was incorporated as a non-profit in 1979 and expanded in 2001, and is one of the protected areas of the Natura 2000 network.

== Landscape and animals ==
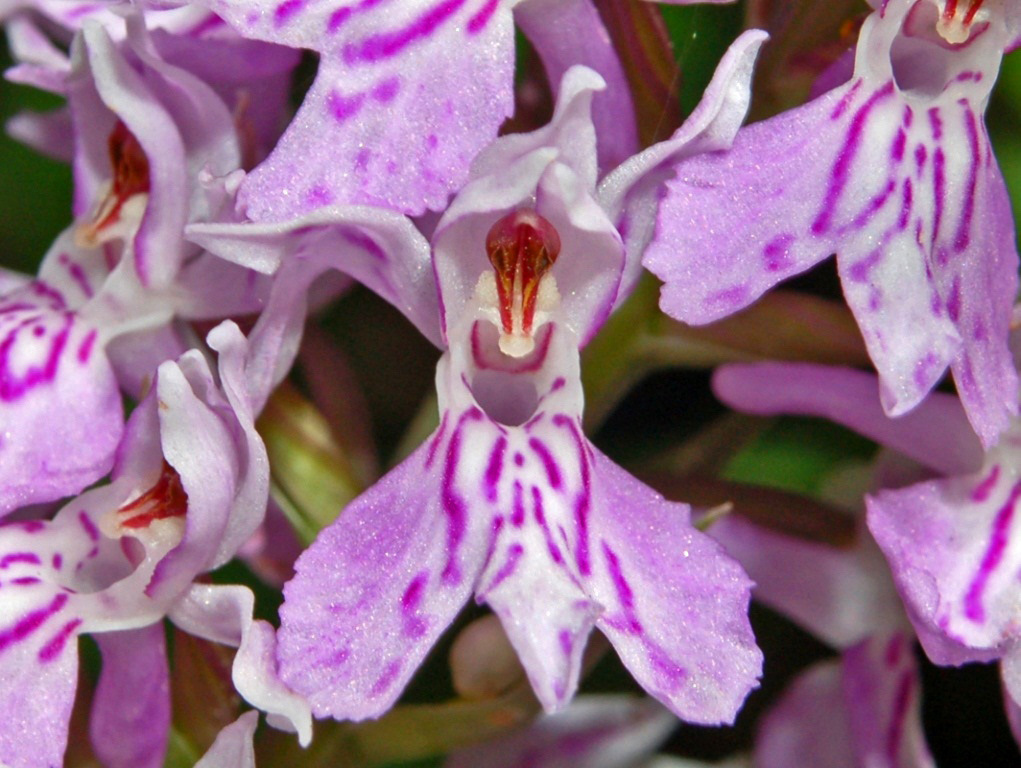
Dactylorhiza maculata, detail

The area includes farms and fields and a variegated flora and fauna, including Hornsjön, the island's largest lake. The coastline has cliffs, and the land has limestone areas interspersed with wetlands and hardwood forests, besides pastures and hay fields. The Skogsgärdesängen area is rich in orchids (including Anacamptis pyramidalis, Gymnadenia conopsea, and Dactylorhiza maculata), and the forests and the lake support rich bird life, including ospreys, Caspian terns, great crested grebes, and Eurasian bitterns. It has a bird-watching tower.

The lake is also a habitat for bats; twelve of Sweden's eighteen bat species are found here, including Nathusius's pipistrelle and the rare barbastelle.
