= List of fossiliferous stratigraphic units in Sweden =

| Group or Formation | Period | Notes |
|---|---|---|
| Alum Shale Formation | Cambrian | |
| Annero Formation | Cretaceous | |
| Ardrarum Formation | Cambrian | |
| Austerberg Limestone Formation | Silurian | |
| Formations of the Båstad Basin | Cretaceous | |
| Berge Formation | Silurian | |
| Boda Limestone Formation | Ordovician | |
| Burgsvik Beds | Silurian | |
| Ceratopyge Formation | Ordovician | |
| Chasmopskalk Formation | Ordovician | |
| Colonus Shale Beds Formation | Silurian | |
| Dalby Formation | Ordovician | |
| Djupadal Formation | Jurassic | |
| Dictyonema Shale Formation | Ordovician | |
| Ede Quartzite Formation | Silurian | |
| Eke Formation | Silurian | |
| Expansus Formation | Ordovician | |
| Exsulans Limestone Formation | Cambrian | |
| Fjacka Shale Formation | Ordovician | |
| Fjäcka Formation | Ordovician | |
| Folkeslunda Limestone | Ordovician | |
| Furudal Formation | Ordovician | |
| Gillberga Formation | Ordovician | |
| Gislov Formation | Cambrian | |
| Glisstjärn Formation | Ordovician | |
| Gulhogen Formation | Ordovician | |
| Halla Formation | Silurian | |
| Hamra Formation | Silurian | |
| Hemse Formation | Silurian | |
| Holen Formation | Ordovician | |
| Höganäs Formation | Jurassic, Triassic | |
| Högklint Formation | Silurian | |
| Jerrestad Formation | Ordovician | |
| Jonstorp Formation | Ordovician | |
| Kallholn Shale Formation | Silurian | |
| Klasen Formation | Ordovician | |
| Klinta Formation | Silurian | |
| Klinteberg Formation | Silurian | |
| Kogsta Formation | Ordovician | |
| Kopinge Sandstone Formation | Cretaceous | |
| Formations of the Kristianstad Basin | Cretaceous | |
| Kullsberg Formation | Ordovician | |
| Kyrkås Formation | Ordovician | |
| Langevoja limestone Formation | Ordovician | |
| Lerberg Marlstone Formation | Silurian | |
| Lilla Karlso Limestone Formation | Silurian | |
| Loka Formation | Ordovician | |
| Lower Visby Formation | Silurian | |
| Mickwitzia Sandstone Formation | Cambrian | |
| Mine Formation | Triassic | |
| Mossen Formation | Ordovician | |
| Mulde Formation | Silurian | |
| Oelandicus Shale Formation | Cambrian | |
| Ojlemyr cherts Formation | Ordovician | |
| Oved Sandstone Formation | Silurian | |
| Pentamerus gotlandicus Limestone Formation | Silurian | |
| Persnas Formation | Ordovician | |
| Rya Formation | Jurassic | |
| Ryd Limestone Formation | Ordovician | |
| Seby Limestone Formation | Ordovician | |
| Segerstad Limestone Formation | Ordovician | |
| Skagen Formation | Ordovician | |
| Skarlov Limestone Formation | Ordovician | |
| Slite Formation | Silurian | |
| Slite Group/Hangvar Formation | Silurian | |
| Slite Group/Slite f Formation | Silurian | |
| Spangande Limestone Formation | Silurian | |
| Stevns Klint Formation | Paleogene | |
| Sularp Formation | Ordovician | |
| Sularp Shale Formation | Ordovician | |
| Sundre Formation | Silurian | |
| Sundre Beds Formation | Silurian | |
| Särdal Beds Formation | Cretaceous | |
| Tofta Formation | Silurian | |
| Tofta Beds Formation | Silurian | |
| Tommarp Formation | Ordovician | |
| Ulanda Mudstone Formation | Ordovician | |
| Upper Visby Formation | Silurian | |
| Venenäs Formation | Cambrian | |
| Formations of the Vomb Trough | Cretaceous | |
| Visby Beds Formation | Silurian | |
| Öved Formation | Silurian | |

== See also ==
- Lists of fossiliferous stratigraphic units in Europe
