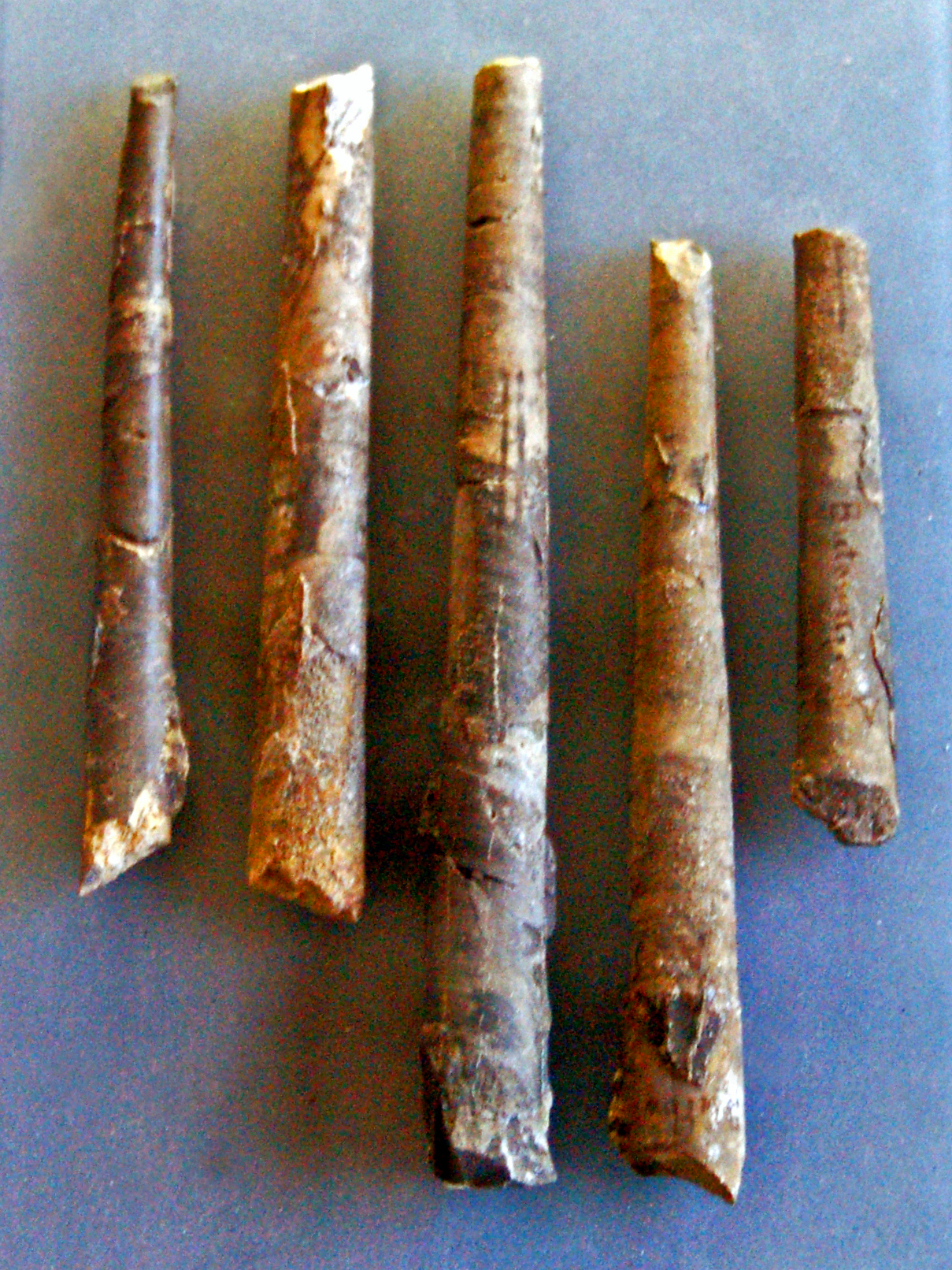
- Plagiostomoceras pleurotomum from Jinonice, Prague (Czech Republic) at the National Museum (Prague)

Scientific classification
- Kingdom: Animalia
- Phylum: Mollusca
- Class: Cephalopoda
- Order: †Orthocerida
- Family: †Orthoceratidae
- Genus: †Plagiostomoceras; Teichert and Glenister, 1952

= Plagiostomoceras =

Plagiostomoceras Temporal range: U Ord - L Dev

Extinct genus of nautiloids

Plagiostomoceras is an orthocerid cephalopod from the lower Paleozoic (Upper Ordovician to Lower Devonian) of Europe and Australia.

Shells of Plagiostomoceras are long slender orthocones with circular to slightly depressed cross sections. Sutures are straight or slightly oblique and may have faint lateral lobes. The siphuncle is central or offset, probably ventrally. The aperture is strongly oblique, sloping adapically toward the presumed venter.

Plagiostomoceras is included in the Michelinoceratinae, a subfamily of the Orthoceratidae.

== See also ==
- List of nautiloids
