= Hypostome =

In zoology, the hypostome can refer to structures in distinct animal groups:

- Hypostome (trilobite), the ventral mouthpart plate in trilobites
- Hypostome (tick), the barbed attachment structure associated with the mouthparts of parasitic arachnids
- Hypostome (cnidarian), the oral tip surrounded by tentacles in hydrozoan cnidarians
