= Hornsjön =

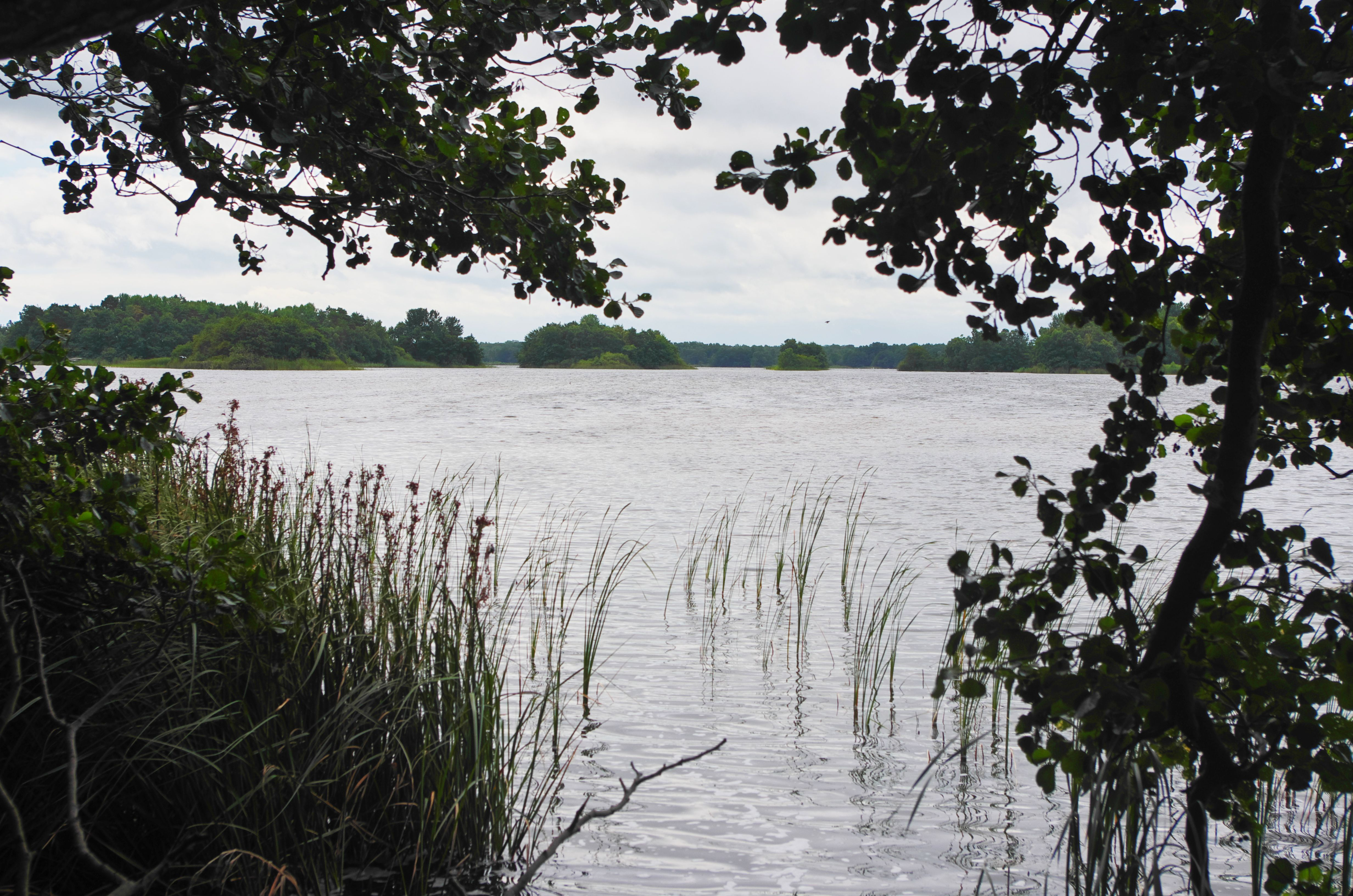

- Location within Kalmar Location within Sweden
- Location: Öland, Sweden
- Coordinates: 57°11′N 16°57′E
- Type: lake
- Surface area: two square kilometres (0.77 sq mi)
- Max. depth: four metres (13 ft)

Hornsjön, also known as Hornsviken, is the largest lake on the island of Öland, Sweden. Located in Högby socken near Löttorp, it has a surface area of around two square kilometres (0.77 sq mi) and a maximum depth of four metres (13 ft).

The lake lies in Horns Kungsgård, one of the protected areas in the Natura 2000 network.
