= Eudolatites =

Scientific classification
- Kingdom: Animalia
- Phylum: Arthropoda
- Clade: †Artiopoda
- Class: †Trilobita
- Order: †Phacopida
- Family: †Dalmanitidae
- Genus: †Eudolatites; Delo, 1935

Genus of trilobites

Eudolatites is a trilobite in the order Phacopida, that existed during the upper Ordovician in what is now the Czech Republic. It was described by Delo in 1935, and the type species is Eudolatites angelini, which was originally described under the genus Dalmanites by Barrande in 1852. The type locality was the Bohdalee Formation.
