= Dalmanitina =

Scientific classification
- Domain: Eukaryota
- Kingdom: Animalia
- Phylum: Arthropoda
- Class: †Trilobita
- Order: †Phacopida
- Family: †Dalmanitidae
- Genus: †Dalmanitina; Reed, 1905

Extinct genus of trilobites

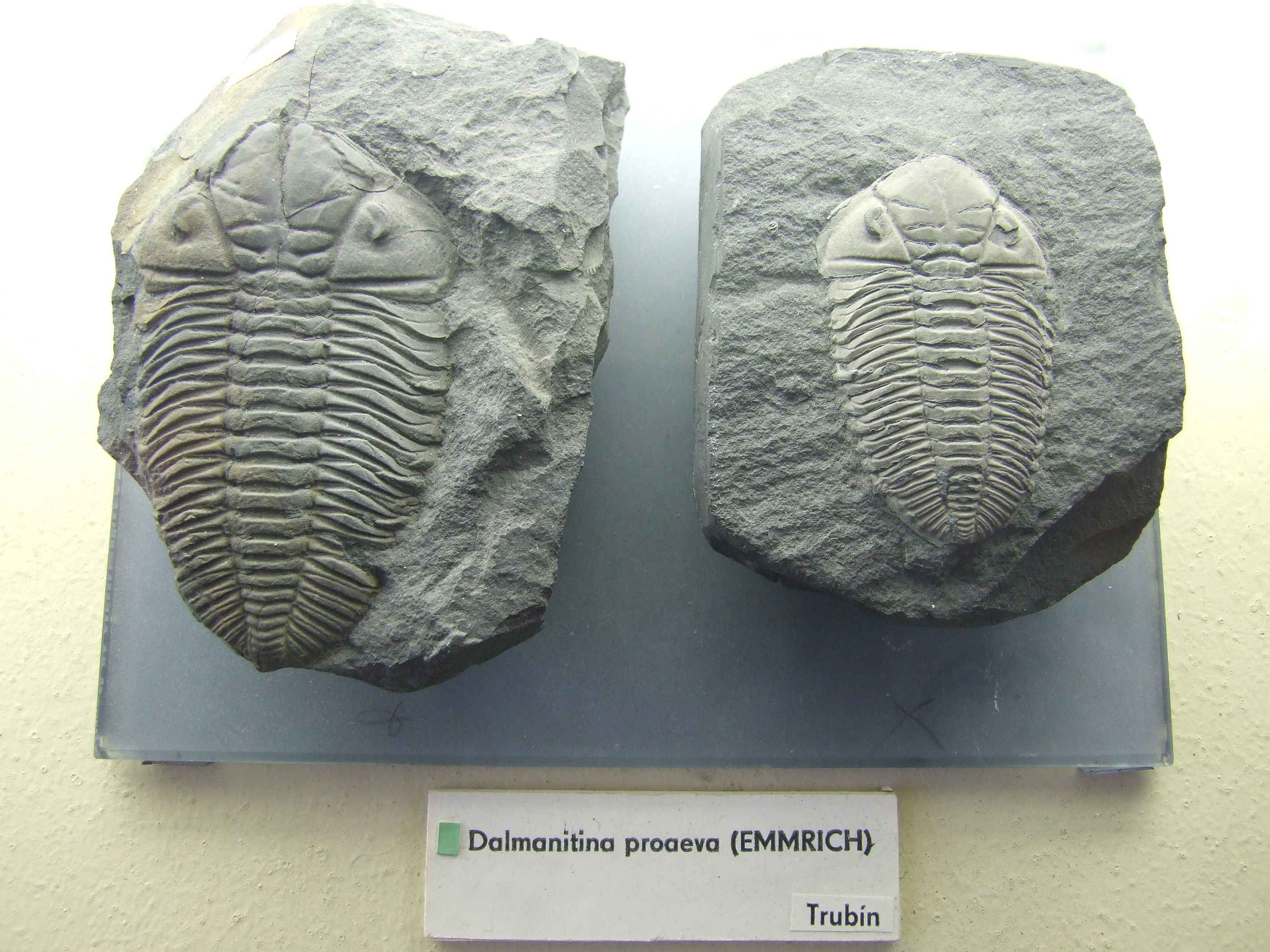
Dalmanitina proaeva fossils on display in Prague

Dalmanitina is an extinct genus of trilobite in the family Dalmanitidae. There are about seven described species in Dalmanitina.

== Species ==
These seven species belong to the genus Dalmanitina:

- † Dalmanitina acuta Hammann, 1971
- † Dalmanitina destombesi (Henry, 1965)
- † Dalmanitina osiris
- † Dalmanitina philippoti Henry, 1980
- † Dalmanitina tellecheai (Harrington & Leanza, 1957)
- † Dalmanitina wagneri
- † Dalmanitina socialis (Barrande, 1846)
