= Eccoptochile =

Scientific classification
- Domain: Eukaryota
- Kingdom: Animalia
- Phylum: Arthropoda
- Class: †Trilobita
- Order: †Phacopida
- Family: †Cheiruridae
- Genus: †Eccoptochile; Hawle & Corda, 1847

Genus of trilobites

Eccoptochile is an extinct genus of trilobites in the order Phacopida.
