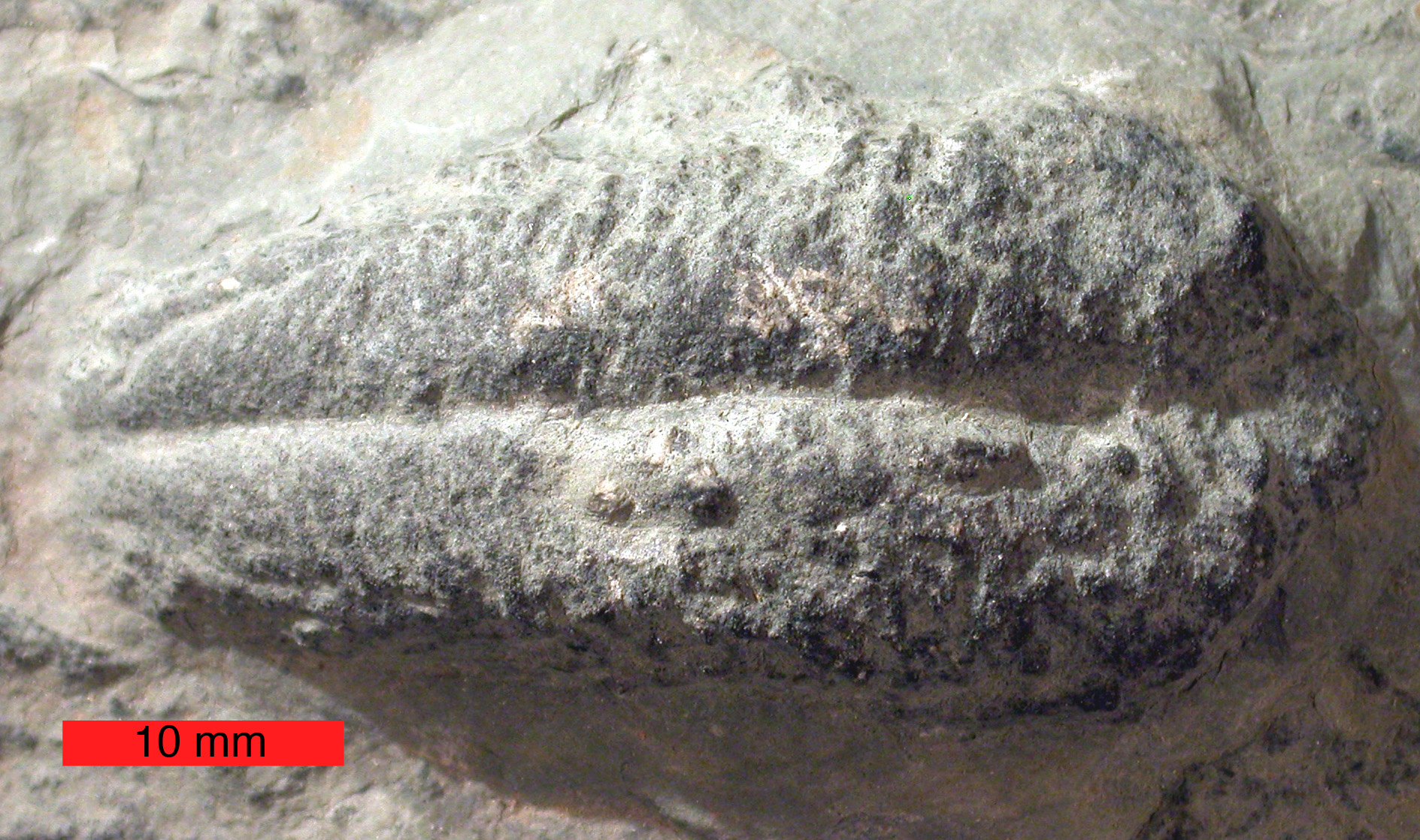
- Rusophycus trace fossil from the Ordovician of southern Ohio. Scale bar is 10 mm.

Trace fossil classification
- Domain: Eukaryota
- Kingdom: Animalia
- Phylum: Arthropoda
- Ichnogenus: †Rusophycus; J. Hall, 1852

= Rusophycus =

Rusophycus Temporal range: Early Cambrian–Early Triassic

Trace fossil ichnogenus

Rusophycus is an ichnogenus of trace fossil (fossil records of lifeforms' movement, rather than of the lifeforms themselves) allied to Cruziana. Rusophycus is the resting trace, recording the outline of the tracemaker; Cruziana is made when the organism moved. The sculpture of Rusophycus may reveal the approximate number of legs that the tracemaker had, although striations (scratchmarks) from a single leg may overlap or be repeated.

Both Rusophycus and Cruziana are typically associated with trilobites but can also be made by other arthropods. Rusophycus is known from sediments dating to the earliest Cambrian Period (somewhat before the first appearance trilobite fossils), and from the Triassic Period (after the Permian extinction of trilobites), indicating that other producers could make the trace.
