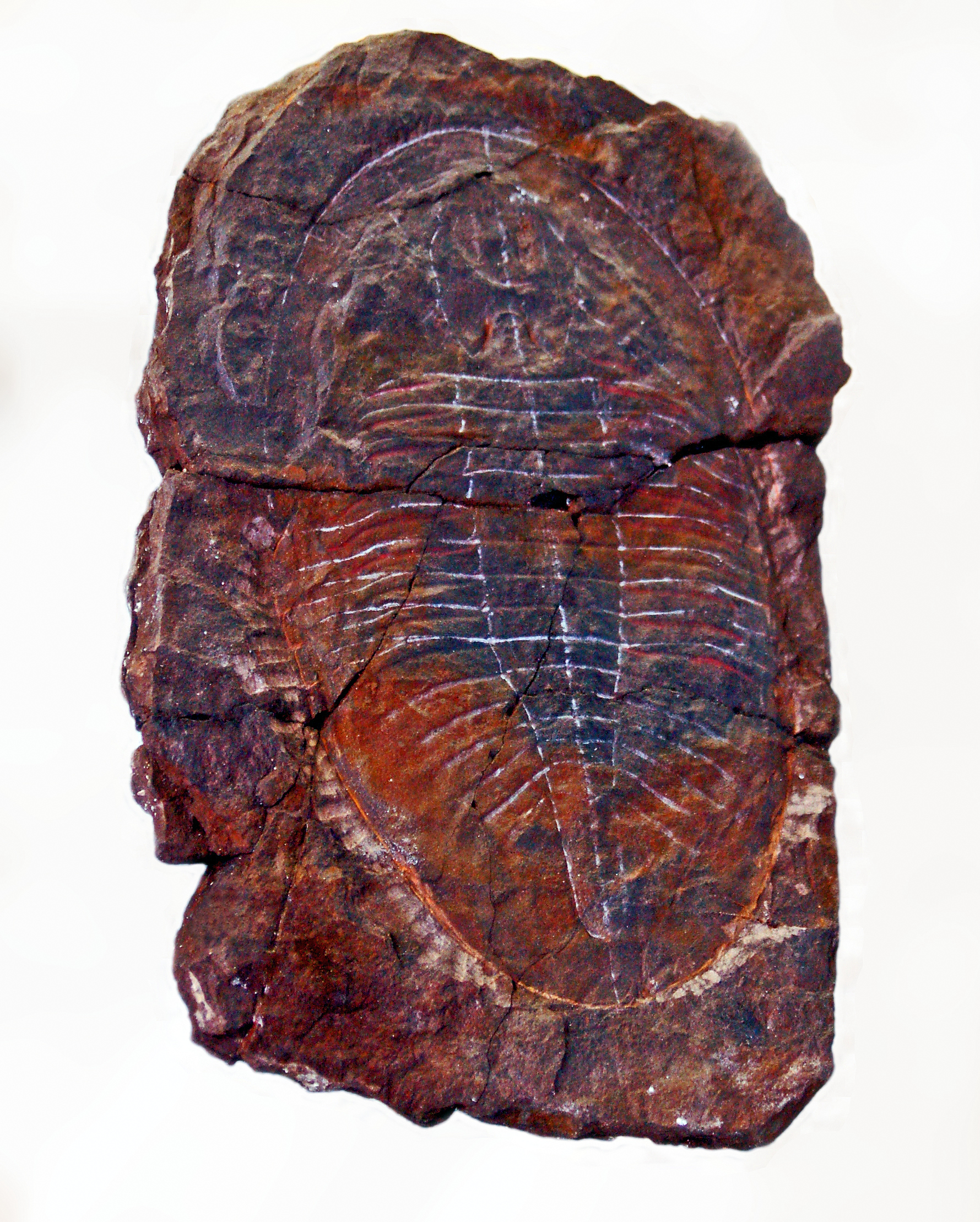
- B. ingens from Czech Republic at the National Museum (Prague)

Scientific classification
- Kingdom: Animalia
- Phylum: Arthropoda
- Clade: †Artiopoda
- Class: †Trilobita
- Order: †Asaphida
- Family: †Asaphidae
- Genus: †Birmanites; Sheng, 1934

Synonyms
- Opsimasaphus Kielan 1960

= Birmanites =

Birmanites Temporal range: Upper Cambrian–Silurian

Extinct genus of trilobites

Birmanites is a genus of trilobites in the order Asaphida, family Asaphidae.

They lived in the Ordovician period, from the Tremadocian age until the Lower Ashgillian age (488.3-449.5 million years ago). These arthropods were a low-level epifauna, fast-moving and detritivore.

== Distribution ==
Ordovician of Canada, China, the Czech Republic, Ireland, Italy, Sweden, the United Kingdom; Llandeilo of China; Arenigian of Argentina, China.

== List ==
- Birmanites yunnanensis (China)
