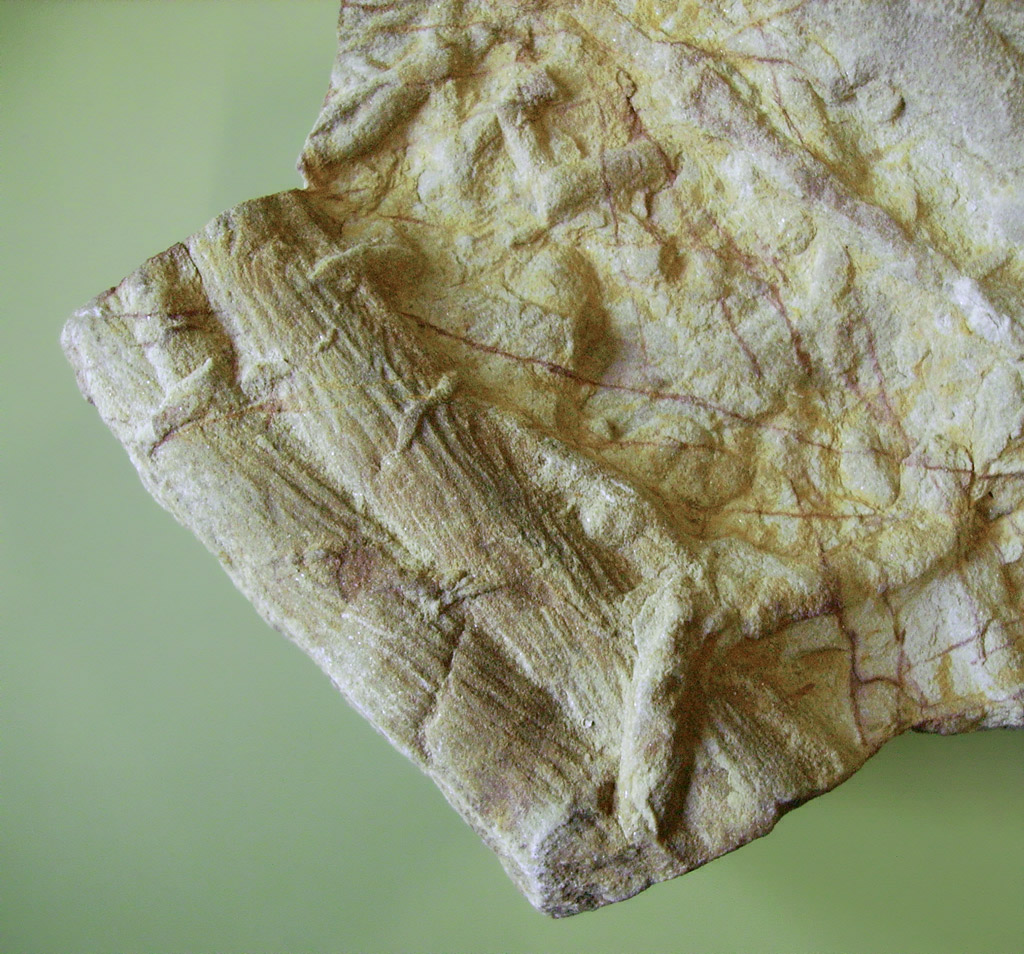
- Cruziana, fossil trackways of trilobites.

Trace fossil classification
- Kingdom: Animalia
- Phylum: Arthropoda
- Clade: †Artiopoda
- Class: †Trilobita
- Ichnogenus: †Cruziana d'Orbigny, 1842

= Cruziana =

Cruziana Temporal range: Cambrian - Triassic, 537–250 Ma

Ichnogenus of trace fossils

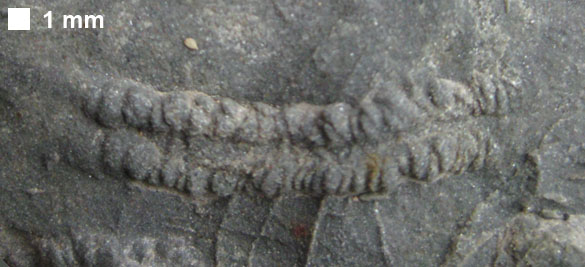
Cruziana from the Devonian Brallier Formation or Harrell Formation.

Cruziana is a trace fossil (fossil records of lifeforms' movement, rather than of the lifeforms themselves) consisting of elongate, bilobed, approximately bilaterally symmetrical burrows, usually preserved along bedding planes, with a sculpture of repeated striations that are mostly oblique to the long dimension. It is found in marine and freshwater sediments. It first appears in upper Fortunian rocks of northern Iran and northern Norway. Cruziana has been extensively studied because it has uses in biostratigraphy (specific scratch patterns are unique to specific time intervals), and because the traces can reveal many aspects of their makers' behavior.

Cruziana is typically associated with trilobites but can also made by other arthropods. Cruziana appears in non-marine formations such as the Beacon Supergroup that would have been unsuitable environments for trilobites, and in Triassic sediments that were deposited after trilobites became extinct at the end of the Permian Period.

Cruziana traces can reach 15 mm across and 15 cm in length, with one end usually deeper and wider than the other. The burrow may begin or end with a resting trace called Rusophycus, the outline of which corresponds roughly to the outline of the trace-maker, and with sculpture that may reveal the approximate number of legs, although striations (scratchmarks) from a single leg may overlap or be repeated. Cruziana tenella, and conceivably other ichnospecies, appears to have been formed by the concatenation of a series of Rusophycus traces, suggesting that Cruziana is a feeding trace, rather than a locomotory trace formed by burrowing within a layer of mud as historically believed.

The ichnogenus Diplichnites may be produced where the trackmaker sped up. Several specimens of Cruziana are commonly found associated together at one sedimentary horizon, suggesting that the traces were made by populations of arthropods.
