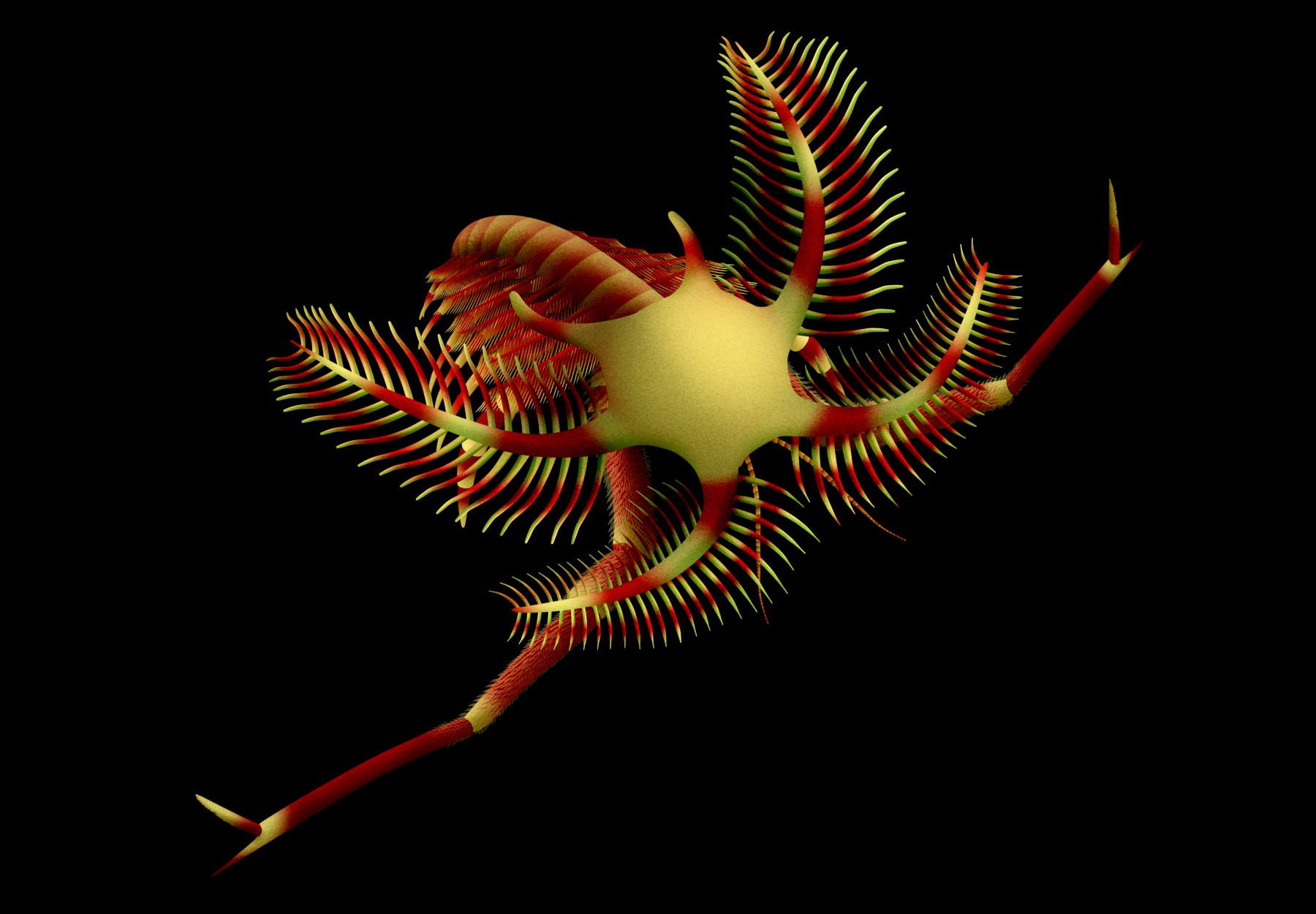
- Restoration

Scientific classification
- Kingdom: Animalia
- Phylum: Arthropoda
- Class: †Marrellomorpha
- Order: †Marrellida
- Family: †Mimetasteridae
- Genus: †Tomlinsonus; Moysiuk et al., 2022
- Species: †T. dimitrii

Binomial name
- †Tomlinsonus dimitrii Moysiuk et al., 2022

= Tomlinsonus =

Tomlinsonus Temporal range: Katian

Extinct genus of marrellomorph

Tomlinsonus is an extinct genus of marrellomorph arthropod known from the Late Ordovician (Katian) Kirkfield Formation of Ontario, Canada. It is a member of Marrellida, and closely related to Mimetaster.

== Description ==
Only a single partial specimen (ROMIP 66233) was recovered during fieldwork in September 2020, by amateur paleontologist Marc Haensel. This specimen preserves a mostly complete head and some appendages. Like other marrellids, the head is composed of a cephalic shield with pairs of spine-like projections, with two large pairs present in Tomlinsonus. These projections curve posteriorly. Like most other marrellids, these projections are covered in second-order spines. There is also a pair of smaller projections without spines extending posteriorly from the back of the head. Attached to the head is a pair of extremely elongate appendages, around 7 centimetres (2.8 in) in length, with 9 podomeres/segments, with a spine present on the end of the 8th podomere, which is the longest leg segment. There is also another, shorter moderately sized cephalic appendage with at least four podomeres, with fourth and distalmost podomere being triangular in shape. There were pairs of filamentous appendages running along the trunk.

== Ecology ==
The depositional environment of the Kirkfield Formation was an open marine carbonate platform. Tomlinsonus was likely a slowly moving animal that lived on the seafloor. It likely used the large first appendage pair to lift itself up off the substrate, and may have rested plantigrade on the 9th podomere to spread its bodyweight, while using its trunk biramous appendages to propel itself forwards.

== Taxonomy ==
In a phylogenetic analysis Tomlinsonus was found a member of Mimetasteridae, as the closest known relative of Mimetaster hexagonalis, with which it shares an enlarged uniramous first appendage, with the supposed Argentinian Mimetaster species "M." florestaensis found to be more closely related to Furca.

After Moysiuk et al., 2022:

- - - - Marrellomorpha
        - - Marrellida
            - - - "Mimetaster" florestaensis
                - Furca bohemica
              - - Mimetaster hexagonalis
                - Tomlinsonus dimitrii
              - Moroccan marrellid ("Furca mauretanica")
            - Marrella
          - - - Palaeoisopus
              - Haliestes
            - Aquilonifer
        - Acercostraca
          - - - Vachonisia
              - Xylokorys
            - Enosiaspis
          - - Skania
            - Primicaris
      - Eoredlichia
      - Mollisonia
    - - Waptia
      - Tokummia
  - Kylinxia
