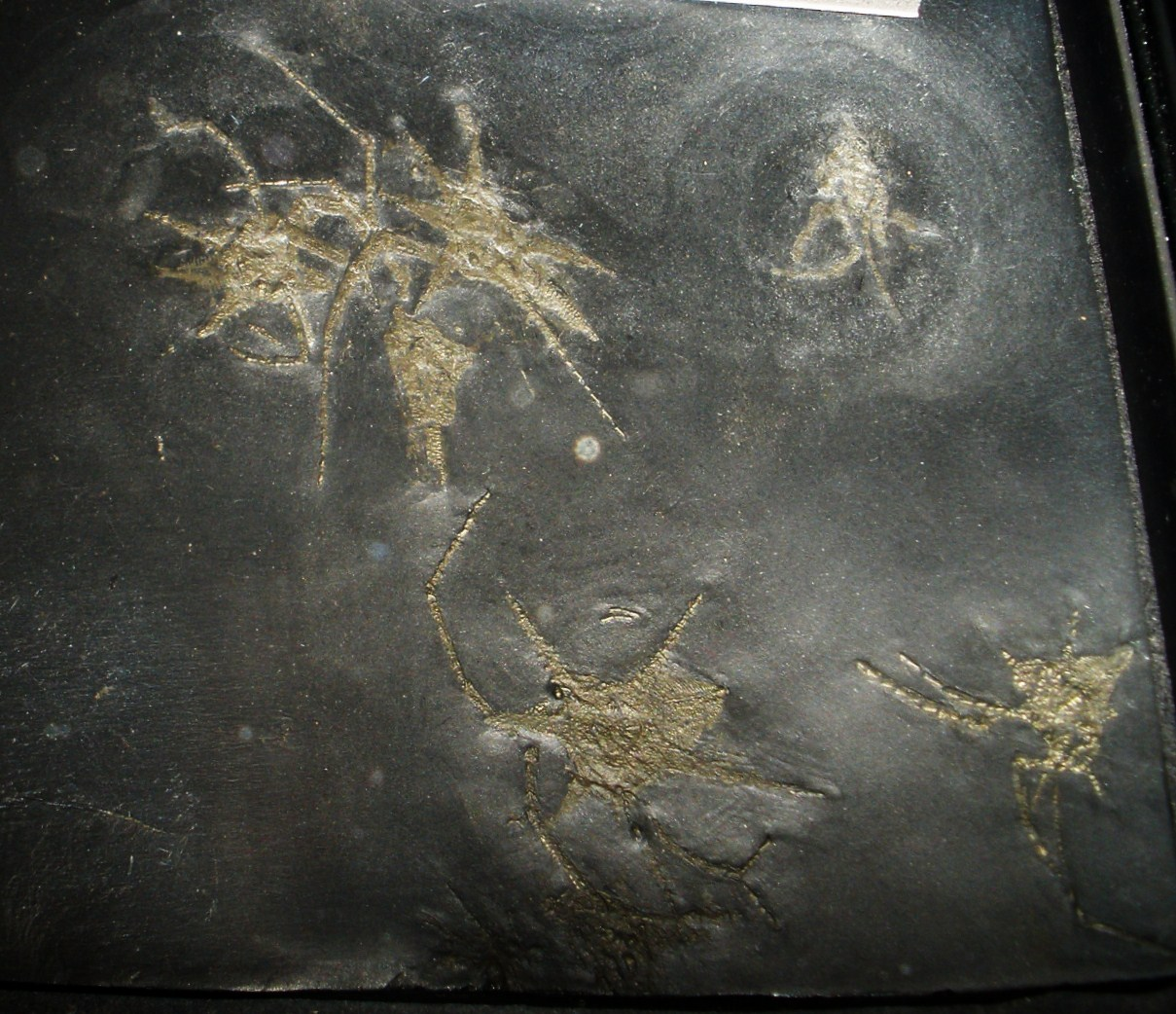
- Fossil specimens
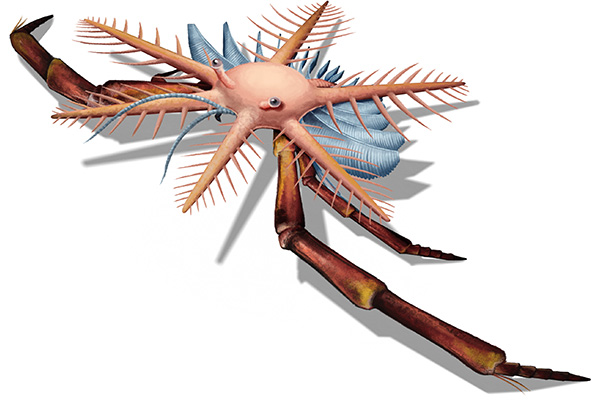
- Life restoration in resting posture (note that in life it would have spent much of its time tilted upwards propped up on its large front legs)

Scientific classification
- Kingdom: Animalia
- Phylum: Arthropoda
- Class: †Marrellomorpha
- Order: †Marrellida
- Family: †Mimetasteridae
- Genus: †Mimetaster; Gürich, 1932

Type species
- Mimaster hexagonalis Gürich, 1931

Species
- M. hexagonalis (Gürich, 1931) (type); "M." florestaensis Aris et al., 2017

Synonyms
- Mimaster Gürich, 1931 (preoccupied)

= Mimetaster =

Mimetaster Temporal range: Emsian

Extinct genus of arthropods

Mimetaster is an extinct genus of marrellomorph arthropod. The type species, Mimetaster hexagonalis is known from the Lower Devonian (Pragian-Emsian) Hunsrück Slate, and amongst the most common arthropods from the locality, with over 120 specimens including three juveniles.

== Description ==
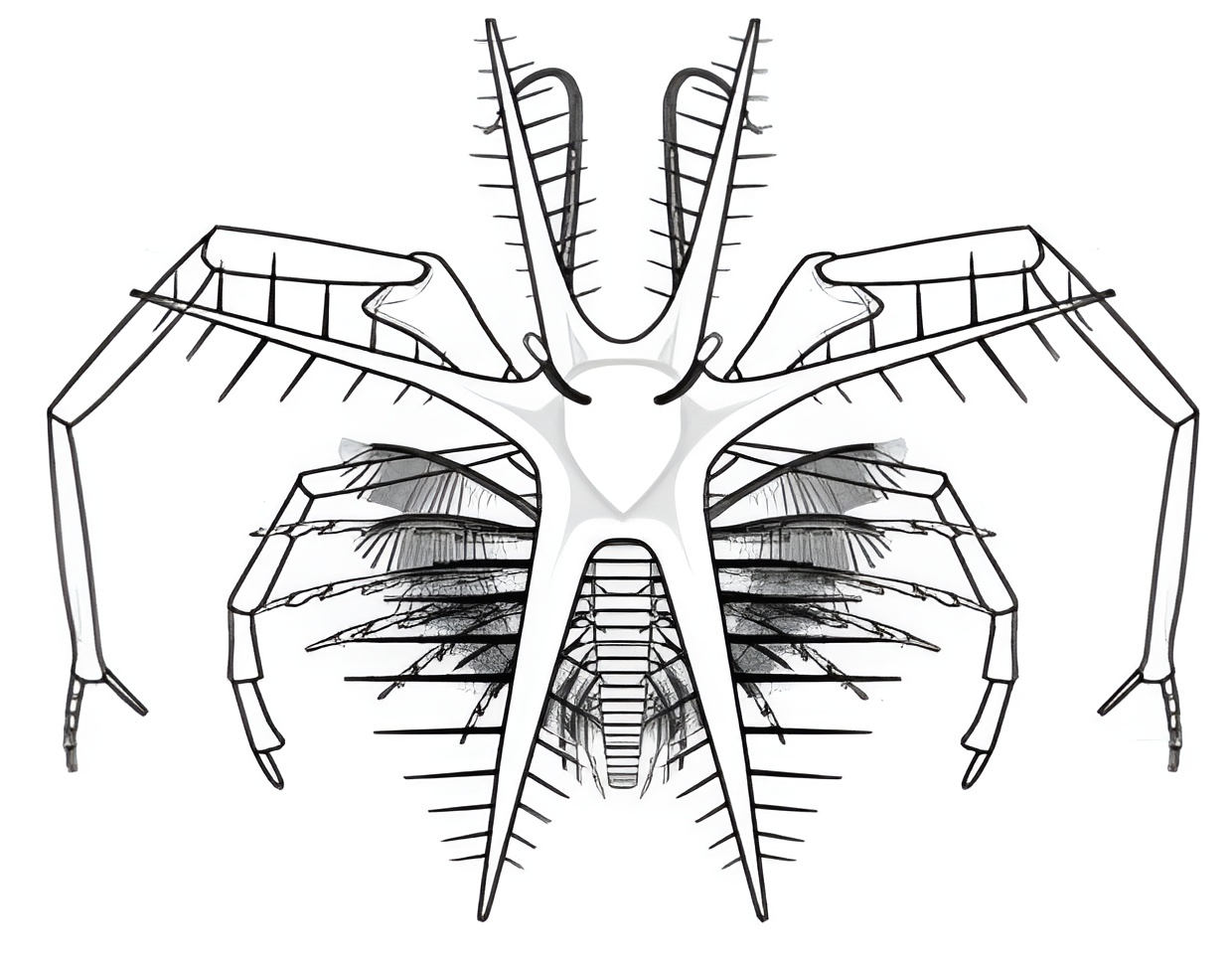
Diagram of M. hexagonalis in dorsal view

The head shield of M. hexagonalis had an average length of 1 centimetre (0.39 in), was oval shaped and raised on its upper surface, with three pairs of elongate straight projections radiating outwards, which have pairs of spines. On the upper surface was attached pair of probable eyes on segmented stalks. Attached on the underside was a pair of forward-projecting elongate segmented antennae, the first 10 segments of which were elongate, while the subsequent 14 were short and flagella-like, as well as two pairs of large uniramous (single-branched) leg-like appendages. The first of the two pairs was substantially larger than the second. Also present on the underside of the head was a hypostome, as well as a "ventral organ" of unclear function. The trunk consisted of up to 32 segments, each approximately 0.25 millimetres (3/256 in) long and each of which except the last bore a pair of biramous (two-branched) appendages, which gradually decreased in size posteriorly. The endopods (lower, leg-like branches) of the biramous appendages had 7 segments/podomeres, each with endites (structures present on the underside) at the end of each segment except the last. The exopods (upper branches of the limbs) had up to 40 segments, each of which had an individual seta (hair-like structures) projecting downwards.

== Ecology ==
M. hexagonalis probably lived in small groups on the seafloor, walking in a tilted, upright posture propped up on its two uniramous legs. The first six trunk endopods are much larger than the remaining pairs, and were likely also used in locomotion, albeit with less power than the two main legs. They are thought to have been deposit feeders. Many specimens have been found associated with tentaculitoids and sponge remains, which suggests that these taxa grew on the surface of Mimetaster as epibionts, which likely acted as camouflage.

== "Mimetaster" florestaensis ==
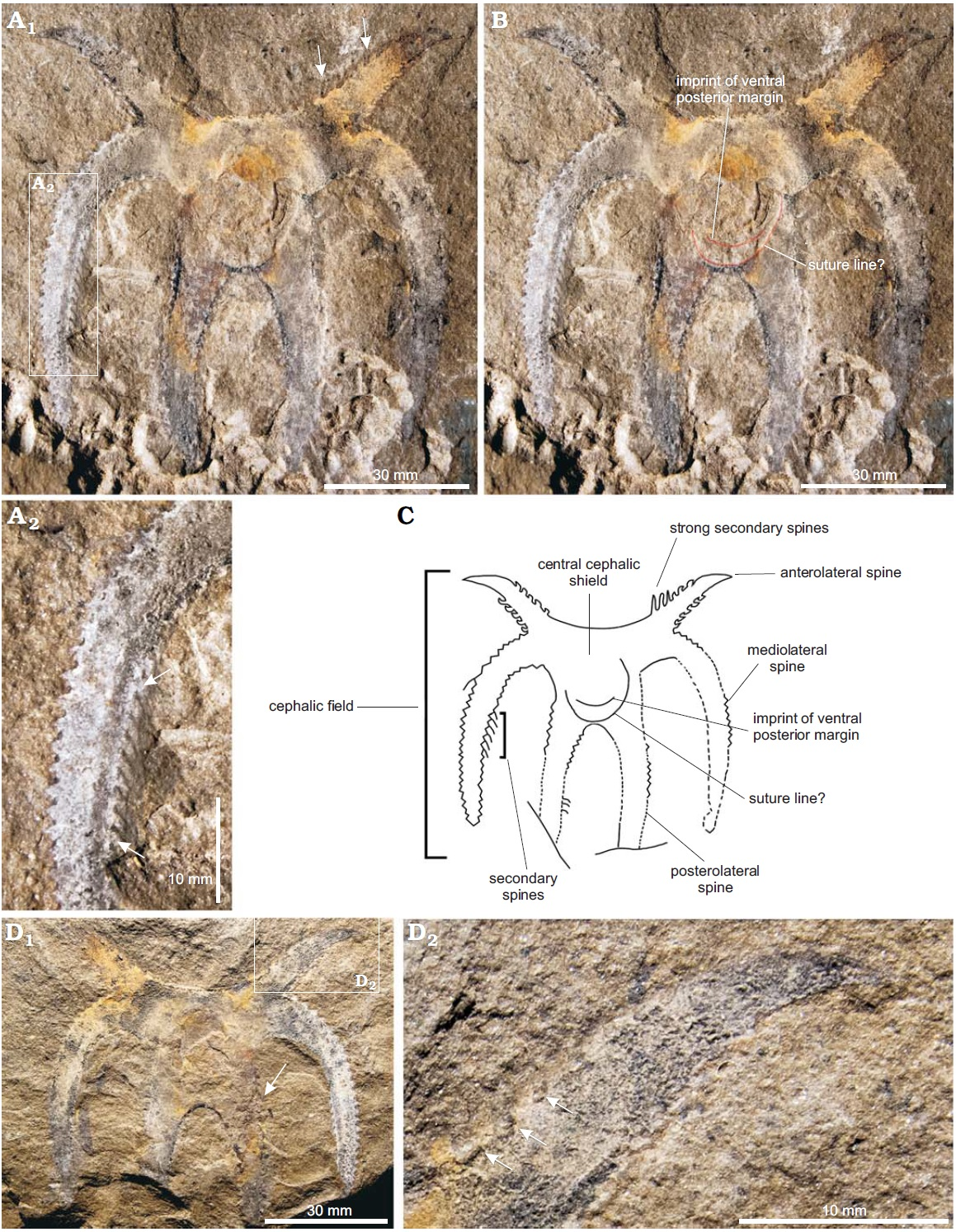
Fossil of "Mimetaster" florestaensis, which is probably only distantly related to M. hexagonalis

"Mimetaster" florestaensis is only known from a head shield, which is characterized by three pairs of curved principal spines, as well as strong secondary spines in the proximal two-thirds of the anterolateral spines. It was found in the Lower Ordovician (Tremadocian) Floresta Formation of Argentina, the first occurrence of this group in South America. However the taxon is quite different from the type species, and was found in a phylogenetic analysis to be more closely related to Furca, and thus probably warrants being placed in a new genus, with the genus Tomlinsonus being the closest known relative of M. hexagonalis.

== Phylogeny ==
After Moysiuk et al., 2022.

- - - - Marrellomorpha
        - - Marrellida
            - - - "Mimetaster" florestaensis
                - Furca bohemica
              - - Mimetaster hexagonalis
                - Tomlinsonus dimitrii
              - Moroccan marrellid ("Furca mauretanica")
            - Marrella
          - - - Palaeoisopus
              - Haliestes
            - Aquilonifer
        - Acercostraca
          - - - Vachonisia
              - Xylokorys
            - Enosiaspis
          - - Skania
            - Primicaris
      - Eoredlichia
      - Mollisonia
    - - Waptia
      - Tokummia
  - Kylinxia

== See also ==
- Hunsrück Slate
