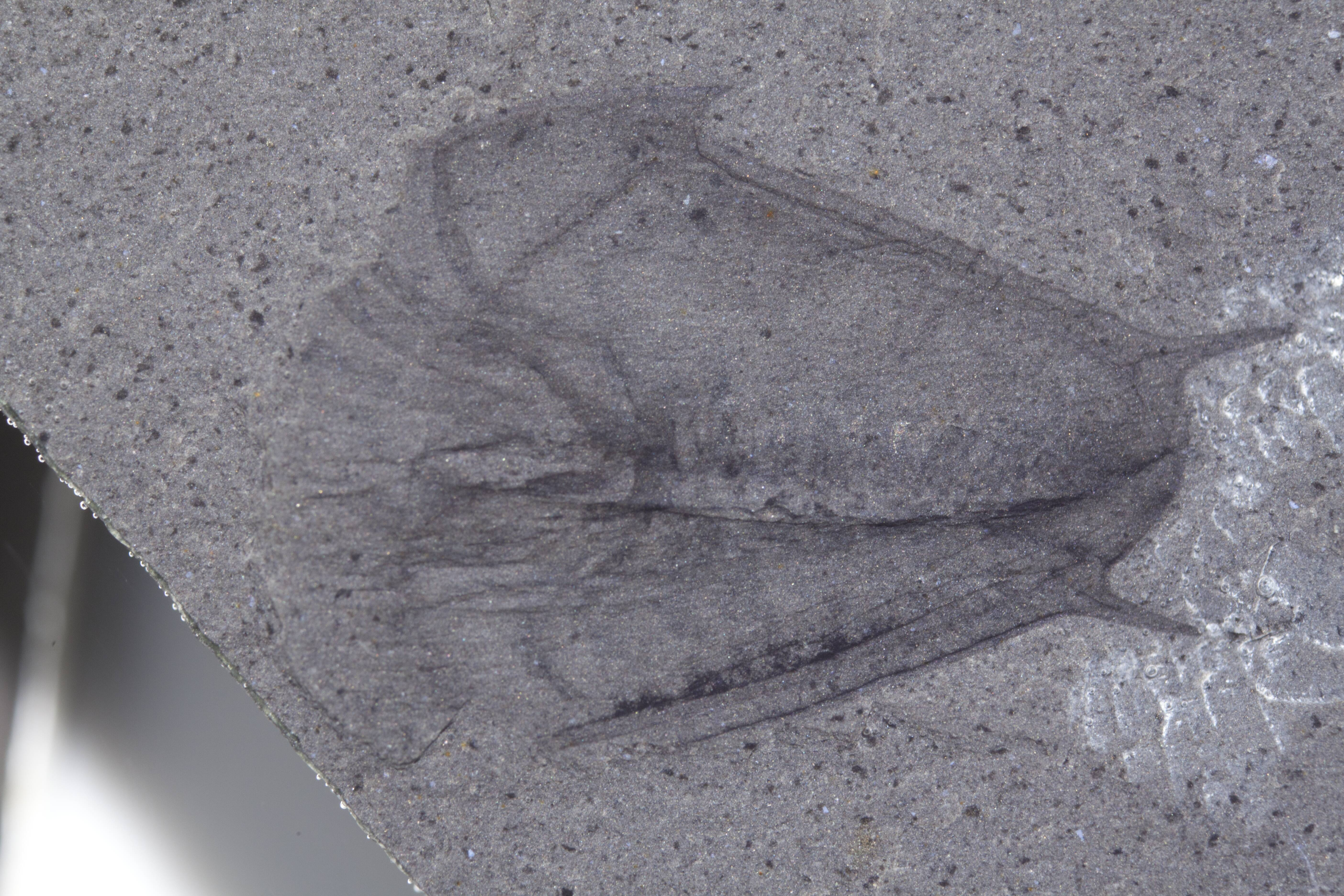
- Holotype of Skania fragilis
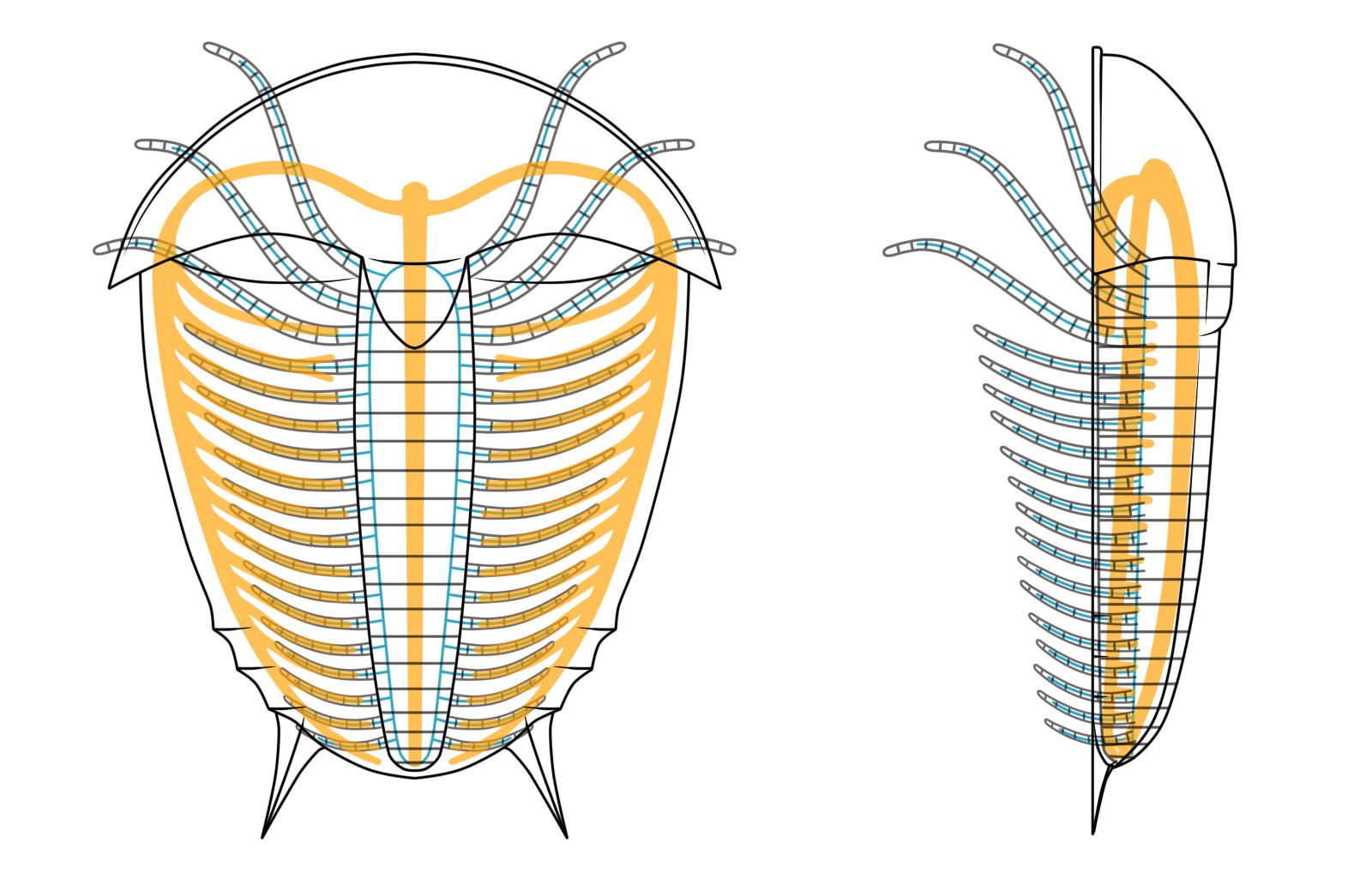
- Illustration of Skania fragilis

Scientific classification
- Kingdom: Animalia
- Phylum: Arthropoda
- Class: †Marrellomorpha
- Order: †Acercostraca
- Genus: †Skania; Walcott, 1931

Species
- S. fragilis Walcott, 1931; "S." sundbergi Lin et al. 2006

= Skania =

Skania Temporal range: Cambrian Stage 3–Middle Cambrian

Extinct genus of arthropods

Skania is a Cambrian fossil arthropod. The type species, S. fragillis, is known from the Burgess Shale of British Columbia, Canada. A second possible species "S." sundbergi is known from the Kaili Formation of China, but its placement within the genus has been questioned.

== Description ==
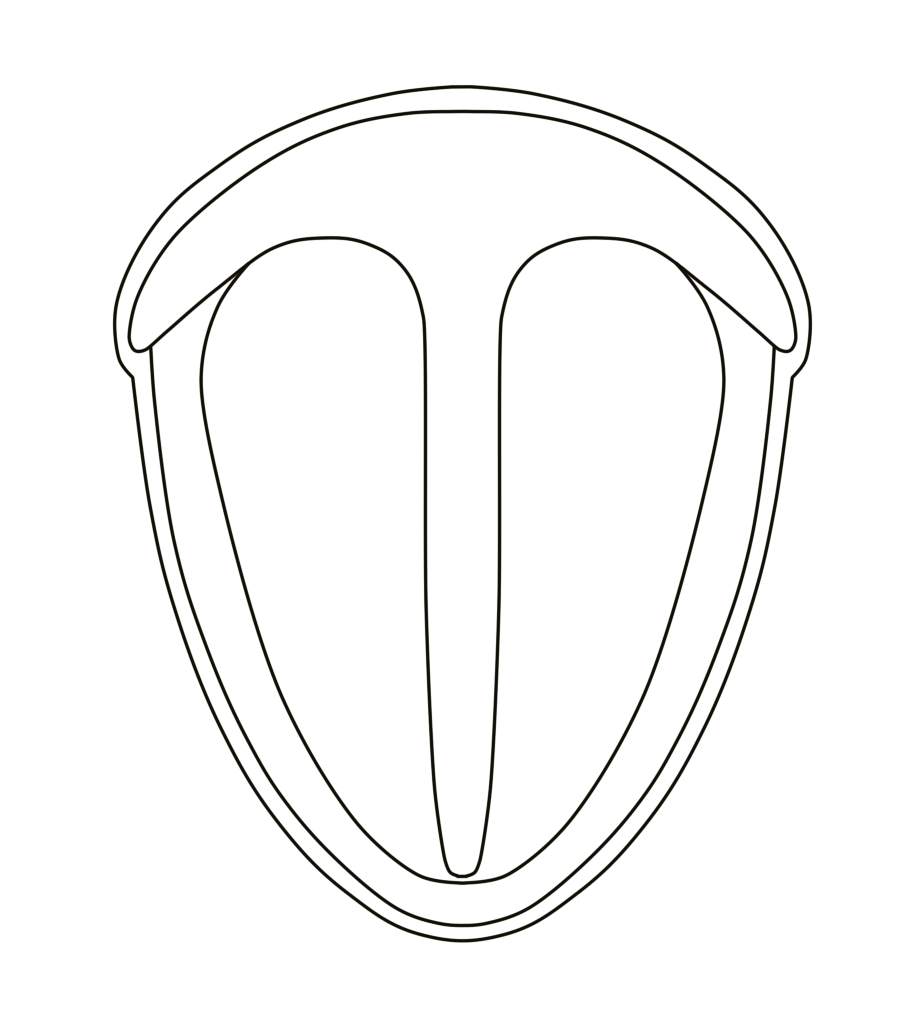
Carapace of "S." sundbergi

Specimens of S. fragillis range in length from 7.5 to 13.5 millimetres (0.30 to 0.53 in) The cordiform dorsal shield/carapace covers the entire body, with its midline having a raised keel. The shield curls around the front to form a doublure, with the posterior edge of the doublure having a pair of lateral spines. A pair of spines is also present on the posterior of the dorsal shield. A hypostome was present on the underside of the head. There are two sets of appendages, the first 5 pairs of appendages are elongate, the first one of which is described as an antenna and has small subquadrate segments/podomeres, while the others have elongate subrectangular segments. These appendages are somewhat curved and extend beyond the shield. In contrast, the trunk appendages are shorter (not extending beyond the shield) and are less curved, and the segments are not preserved. There was a diverticular (digestive) network running through the carapace, along with a central gut tract.

Specimens of "S." sundbergi are on average 7.92 millimetres (0.312 in) in length. The midline keel is more strongly pronounced in "S." sundbergi. The spines present in S. fragillis are either more weakly developed or absent.

== Taxonomy ==
While previously enigmatic, it is now thought to be a marrellomorph, with both species, regardless of generic placement, belonging to Acercostraca. The resemblance with the Ediacaran organism Parvancorina, to which Skania had previously been suggested to be closely related as part of the proposed clade "Parvancorinomorpha", is superficial and they are probably not related.

Phylogeny of Marrellomorpha after Legg, 2016.

- - Outgroups
  - Marrellomorpha
    - Marrellida
      - Marrella splendens
      - Mimetasteridae
        - Furca bohemica
        - - Moroccan marrellid
          - Mimetaster hexagonalis
    - Acercostraca
      - Skania fragilis
      - - Primicaris larvaformis
        - - "Skania" sundbergi
          - Vachonisiidae
            - Enosiaspis hrungnir
            - - Xylokorys chledophilia
              - Vachonisia rogeri
