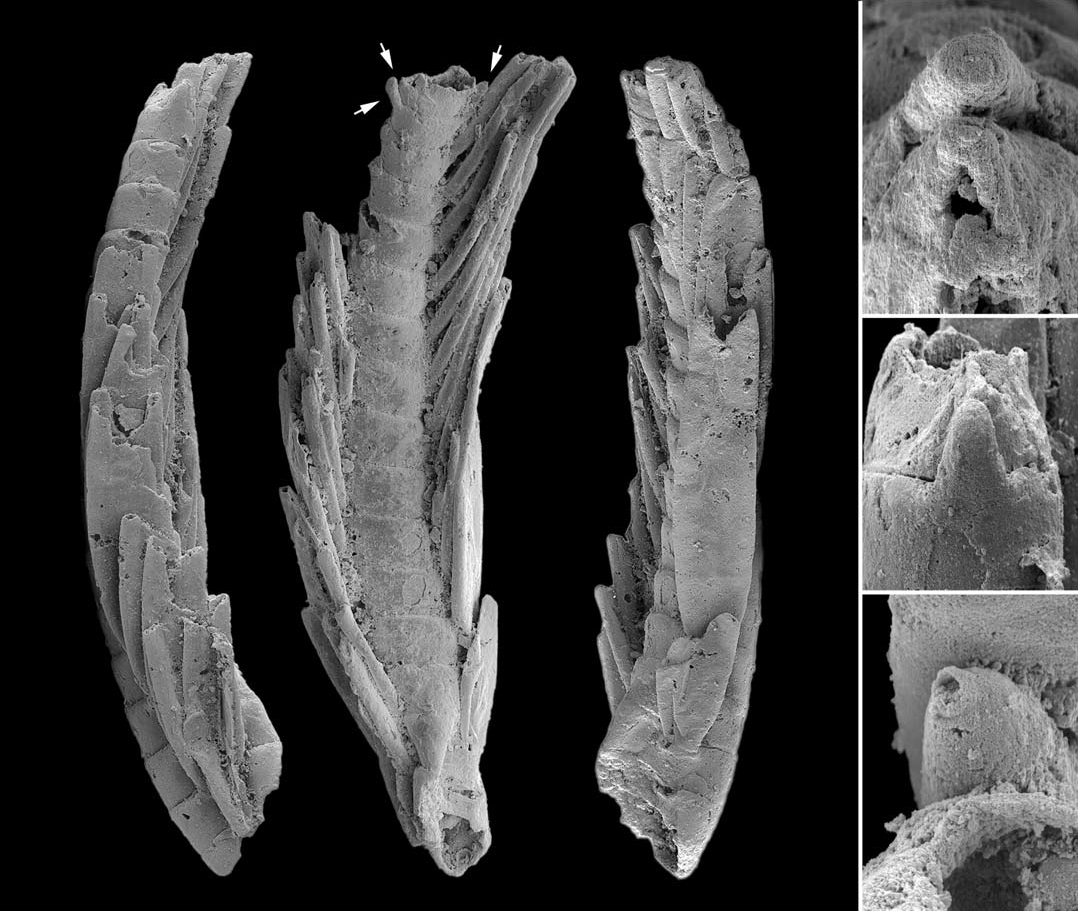

Scientific classification
- Domain: Eukaryota
- Kingdom: Animalia
- Phylum: Arthropoda
- Class: †Marrellomorpha
- Genus: †Austromarrella; Haug et al., 2012

Type species
- †Austromarrella klausmuelleri Haug et al., 2012

= Austromarrella =

Austromarrella Temporal range: Middle Cambrian

Extinct genus of arthropods

Austromarrella is an extinct genus of marrellomorph arthropod known from the Middle Cambrian (late Templetonian to early Floran) of Australia.

== Description ==
Austromarrella is only known from a singular appendage, a post-antennular exopod roughly 970 micrometers long. 17 annuli are preserved, although there are likely more on the appendage due to the terminal annulus still being ring-shaped. These annuli are roughly circular in cross-section, with the proximal one around 150 micrometers across and 70 micrometers long, decreasing to about half these measurements at the distalmost annulus. The fourteen proximal annuli bear a pair of lamellae, one towards the middle and another further to the side. These lamellae are around 560 micrometers long and lanceolate in shape, starting at 40 micrometers wide with their maximum width at around 100 micrometers, then narrowing towards the (not preserved) distal tip. They are roughly 18 micrometers thick throughout their length. The two distal annuli bear short spines instead of lamellae (although in the same positions), with these spines being around 32 micrometers long and 25 micrometers across at their base, narrowing to 14 micrometers.

== Affinity ==
Austromarrella's sheer fragmentary nature makes assigning it to any one group difficult. Multi-annulated exopods like this are present in both marrellomorphs, agnostids and crustaceans, although the latter two bear setae. While lamellae are present in numerous other taxa such as Naraoia, the combination of them with multiple annuli is only present in Marrellomorpha. Therefore, Austromarrella belongs to this clade. Unfortunately no more detailed classification can be determined, as this would depend on the shape of the head shield (which is not preserved).

== Etymology ==
The name derives from the Latin austro (“south”) in reference to the genus’s discovery in the southern hemisphere, and the genus Marrella for the two’s similarities. The species name klausmuelleri honours the late Klaus J. Müller, discoverer of Orsten-type preservation.
