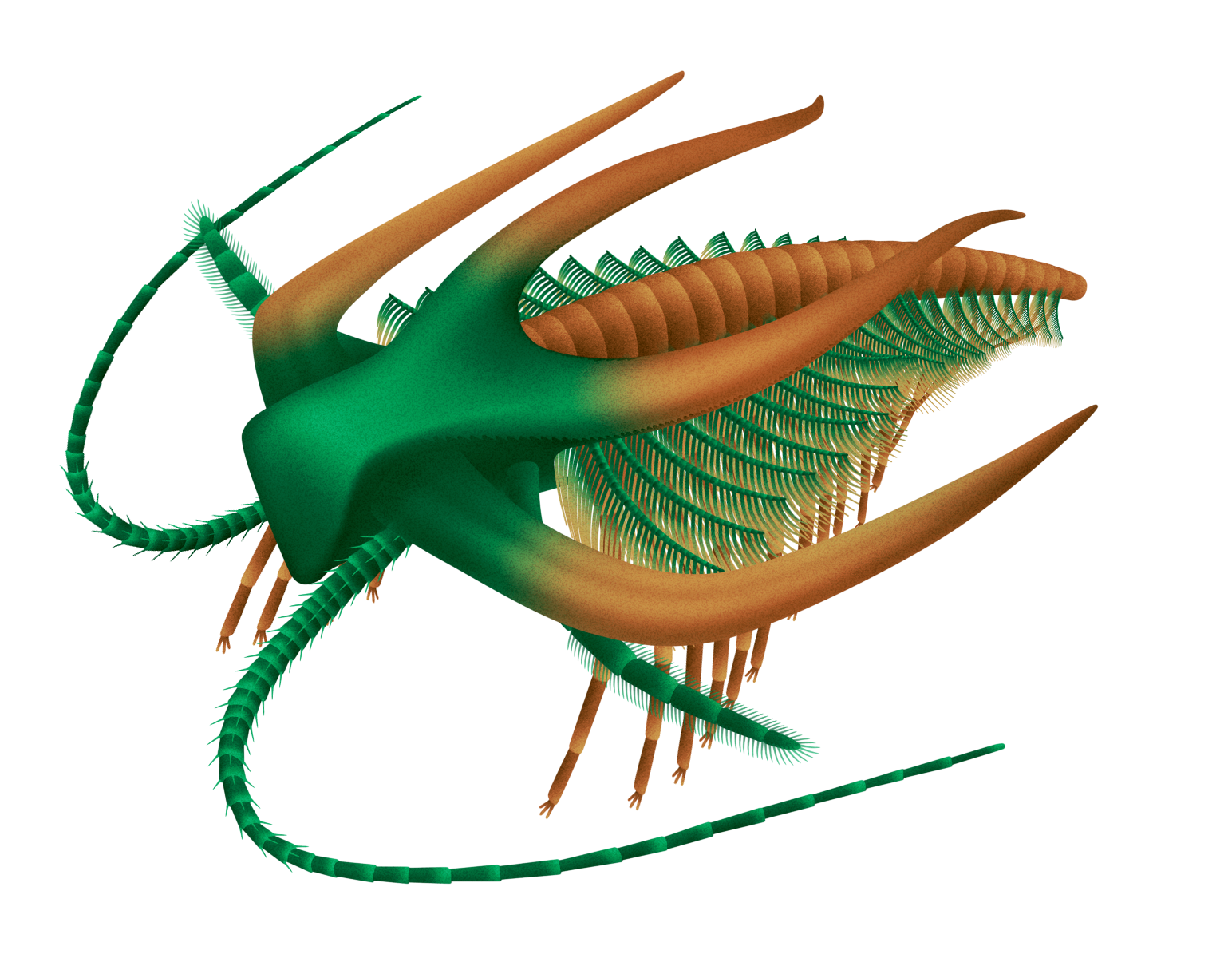
- Life restoration of Marrella (Marrellida)
- Diagram of Primicaris (Acercostraca)

Scientific classification
- Kingdom: Animalia
- Phylum: Arthropoda
- Clade: Deuteropoda
- Class: †Marrellomorpha; Beurlen, 1930

Subgroups
- Acercostraca; Primicaris; Skania; Vachonisiidae; Xylokorys; Vachonisia; Enosiaspis; Marrellida; Marrella; Furca; Mimetaster; Tomlinsonus

= Marrellomorpha =

Marrellomorpha Temporal range: Middle Cambrian - Early Devonian, 508–390 Ma

Extinct class of arthropods

Marrellomorpha are an extinct group of arthropods known from the Cambrian to the Early Devonian. It is divided into two major groups, Marrellida and Acercostraca. They lacked mineralised hard parts, so are only known from areas of exceptional preservation, limiting their fossil distribution. The best known member is Marrella, with thousands of specimens found in the Cambrian aged Burgess Shale of Canada.

== Description and ecology ==
The group is divided up into two major orders, Marrellida and Acercostraca. Both groups have cuticles (exoskeletons) that are not mineralised, unbranched antennae attached to the head section (cephalon) and a segmented trunk (reaching over 25 segments in adult individuals in some species) with a pair of biramous (divided into two branches) appendages attached to each trunk segment except the last. Marrellida is recognised by the possession of head shields with two or three pairs of elongate spine-like projections, and two or three attached pairs of uniramous (single-branched) head appendages (including the antennae), while Acercostraca have large ovoid dorsal shields that cover the entire upper half of the body, and up to five pairs of appendages attached to the head section. In Marrella the second head appendage (the first post-antennal appendage) was flattened, with its edges covered in setae, and is thought to have served as a paddle for swimming, while in other known marrellids, the second head appendage was leg-like and greatly enlarged relative to the other appendages, and is suggested to have served to stabilise or prop the animal up on the seafloor.

The trunks of marrellids are divided into numerous cylindrically-shaped segments. The endopods (lower, leg-like branches) of the biramous trunk limbs of marrellids have six segments (podomeres). The exopods (outer/upper branches of the two-branched biramous trunk limbs) of marrellids had an annulated appearance, and had numerous attached elongate lammelate setae (hair-like structures) and are thought to have functioned for respiration. The trunk limb exopods of at least some acercostracans were similar to those of marrellids.

Marrellids are either suggested to have swum close to the seafloor (Marrella) or have lived walking along the sea floor (other marrellids) and to have used their hind trunk appendages to sift food particles, which were then passed forward by the limbs to the mouth. The posterior trunk appendages of at least some vachonisiid acercostracans have been suggested to have been used the same way, and are also suggested to have lived on the seafloor.

== Taxonomy ==
=== Internal taxonomy ===
Internal taxonomy of Marrellomorpha after Moysiuk et al., 2022.

- Acercostraca Lehmann, 1955
  - Skania Burgess Shale, Canada, Cambrian (Miaolingian) ? Kaili Formation, China, Cambrian (Wuliuan)
  - Primicaris Burgess Shale, Canada, Cambrian (Miaolingian), Maotianshan Shales, China, Cambrian Stage 3
  - Vachonisiidae Tasch, 1969
    - Xylokorys Coalbrookdale Formation, England, Silurian (Wenlock)
    - Vachonisia Hunsrück Slate, Germany, Lower Devonian (Emsian)
    - Enosiaspis Fezouata Formation, Morocco, Early Ordovician (Floian)
- Marrellida Størmer, 1959, pro Marrellina Raymond, 1920
  - Marrella Balang Formation, China, Cambrian Stage 4 Kaili Formation, China, Cambrian (Wuliuan), Burgess Shale, Canada, Cambrian (Miaolingian)
  - Furca Letná Formation, Czech Republic, Upper Ordovician (Sandbian)
  - "Furca mauretanica" (nomen nudum) Fezouata Formation, Morocco, Early Ordovician (Floian)
  - "Mimetaster" florestaensis Floresta Formation Argentina, Lower Ordovician (Tremadocian)
  - Mimetasteridae Birenheide, 1971
    - Tomlinsonus Kirkfield Formation, Canada, Late Ordovician (Katian)
    - Mimetaster Hunsrück Slate, Germany, Lower Devonian (Emsian)

Fragmentary taxa assigned to Marrellomorpha include Austromarrella from Cambrian Series 3 aged deposits in Australia, and Dyrnwynia from the Ordovician (Darriwilian) aged Llanfallteg Formation of Wales, which in its original description was assigned to Marrellida.

Some studies have recovered Marrellomorpha as paraphyletic, with Marrellida and Acercostraca more closely related to other arthropods than they are to each other.

==== Gallery ====
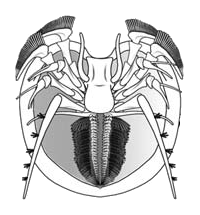
Ventral reconstruction of Xylokorys

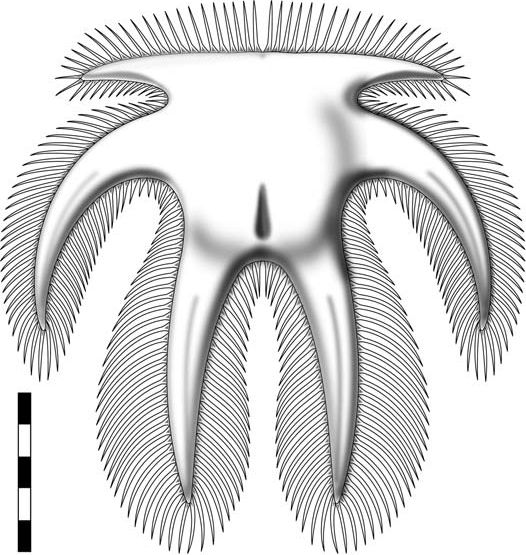
Reconstruction of the head shield of Furca bohemica

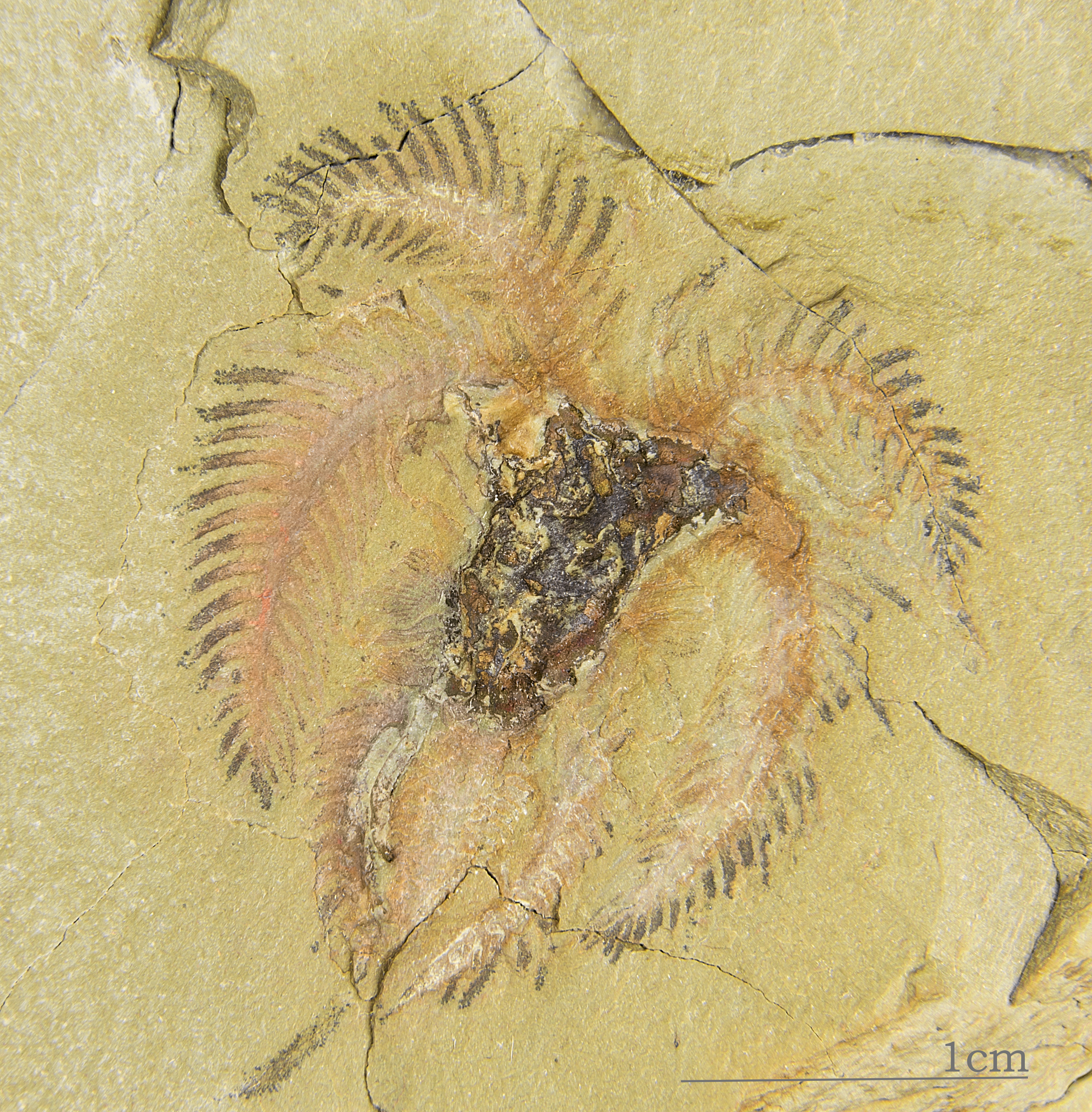
Fossil of "Furca mauretanica"

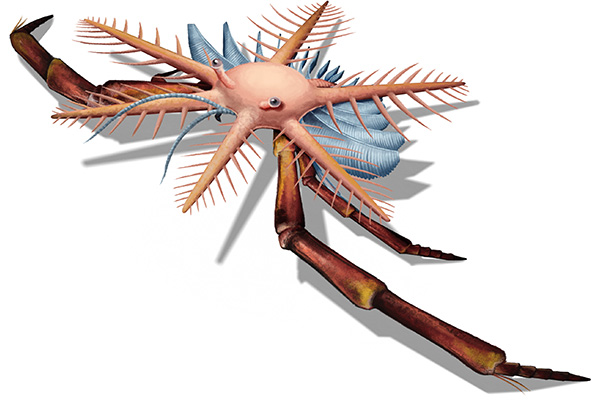
Reconstruction of Mimetaster

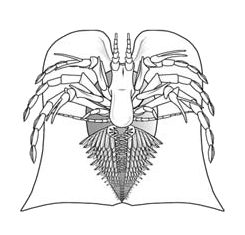
Restoration of Vachonisia

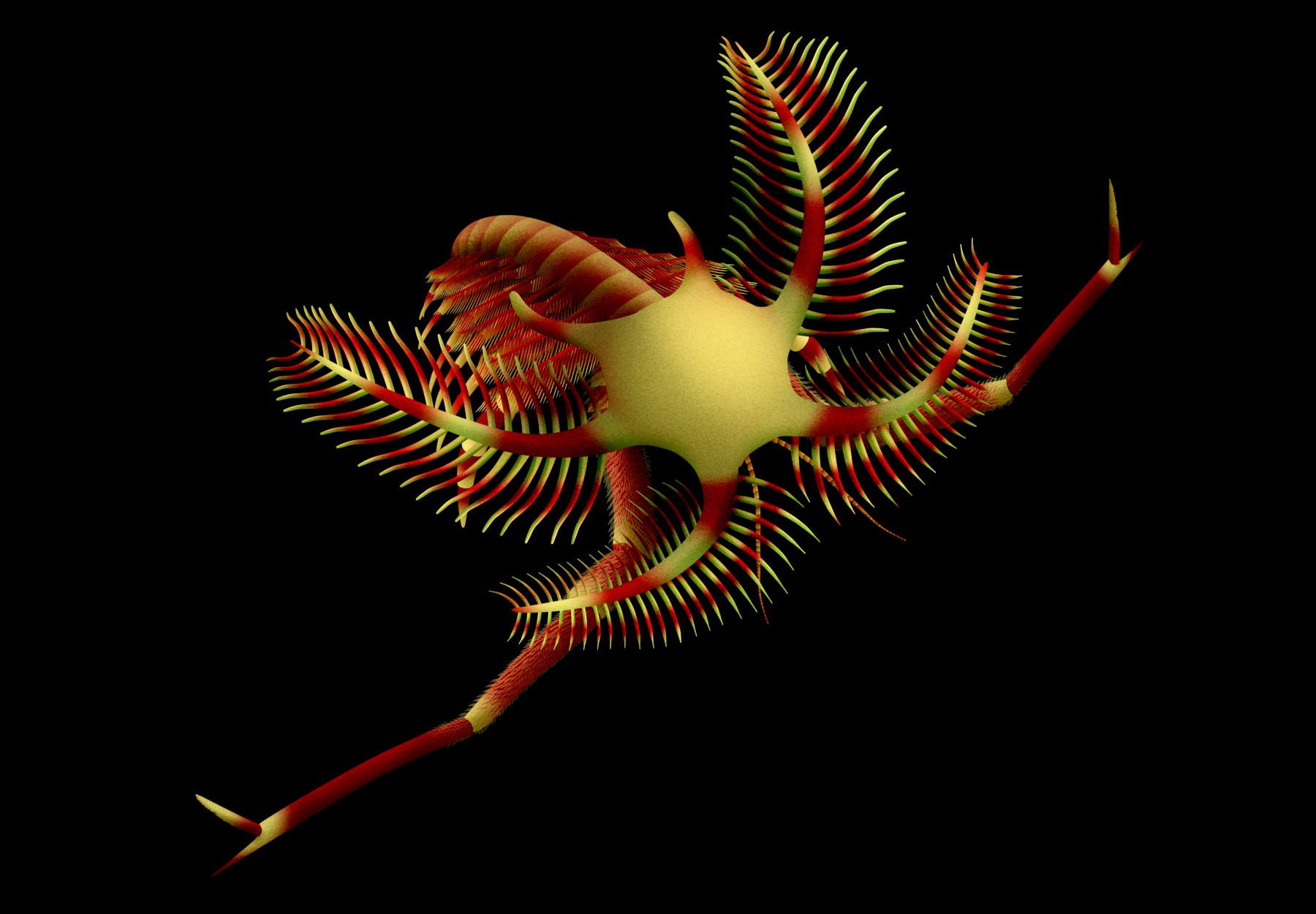
Life restoration of Tomlinsonus

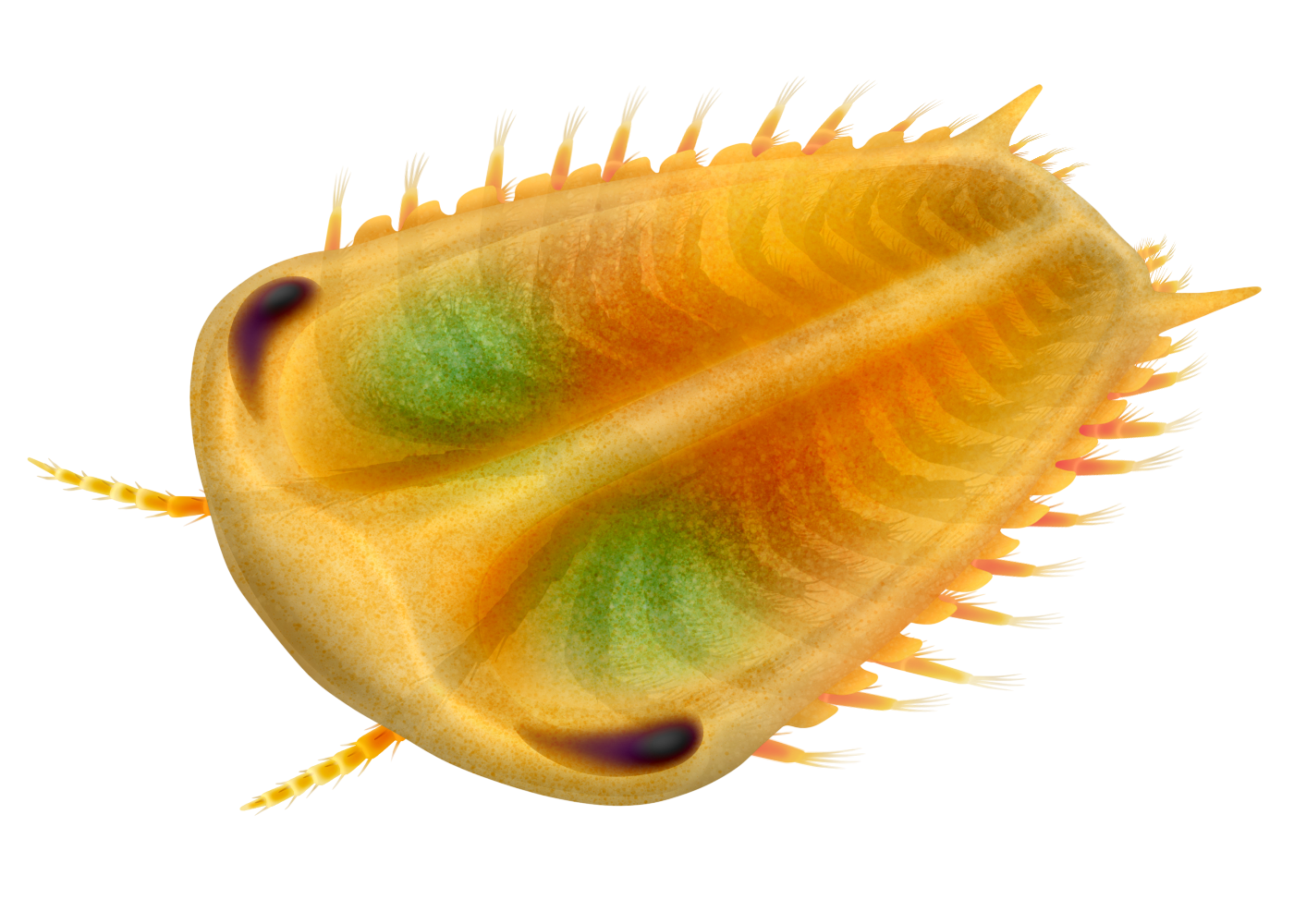
Life restoration of Primicaris

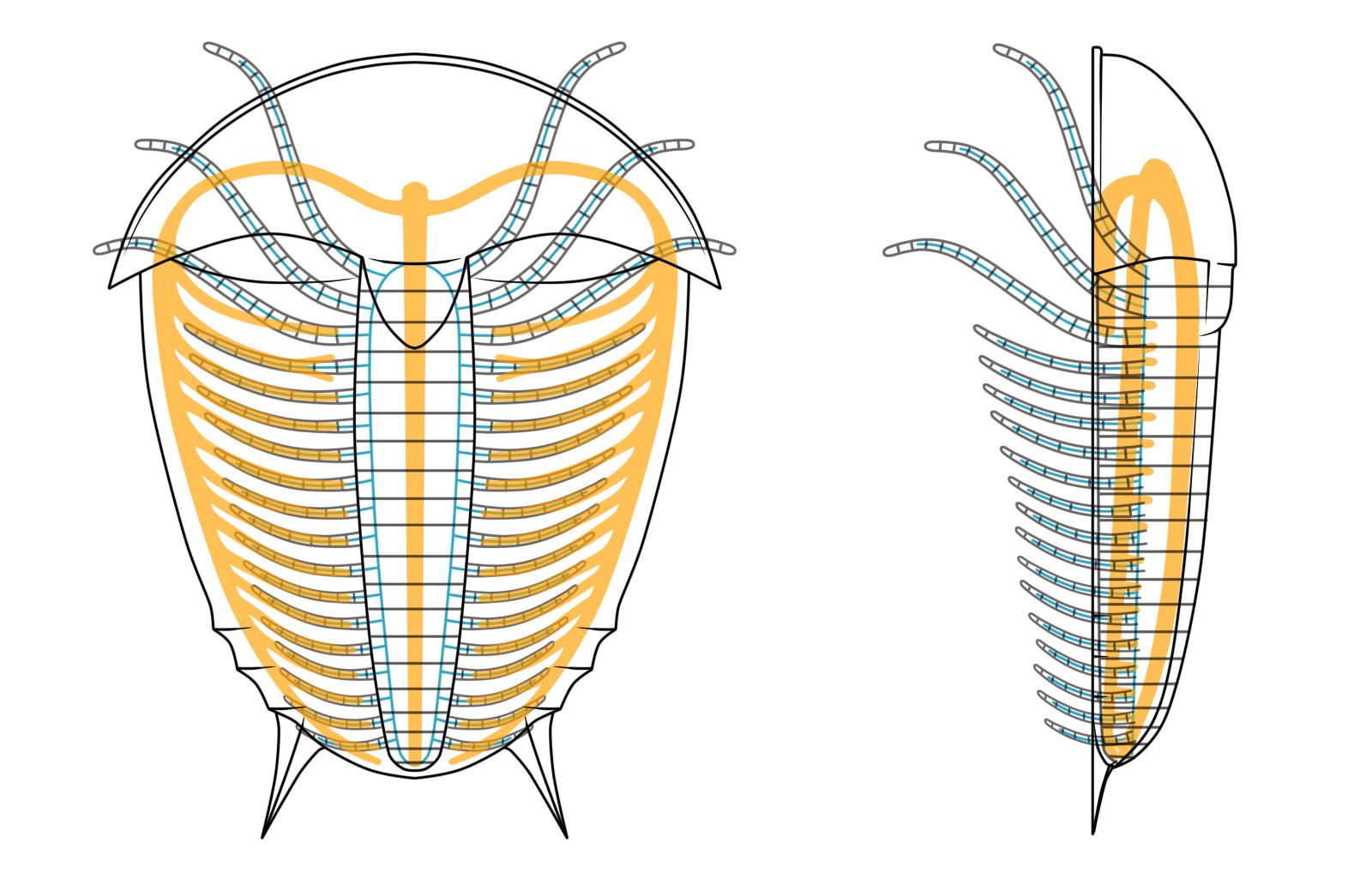
Diagram of Skania

=== Relationship to other arthropods ===
Their phylogenetic position within arthropoda is uncertain, beyond being placed in Deuteropoda for their possession of biramous appendages. Various studies have alternatively placed them in the Arachnomorpha as relatives of Artiopoda (trilobites and kin), as related to Mandibulata (the group containing crustaceans, insects and myriapods), or as stem group euarthropods. The engimatic Cambrian arthropod Burgessia may be closely related to marrellomorphs. Some authors have proposed that they may be closely related to sea spiders (Pycnogonida) within Chelicerata though the cladistical support for such a relationship is relatively weak. A 2025 paper found Marrellomorpha to be within total-group Mandibulata, as a paraphyletic group at the base of Artiopoda, with Marrellomorpha being united with Mandibulata and Artiopoda by the first pair of head appendages being unbranched (uniramous) antennae, among other characters of the morphology and arrangement of the first few head appendages.

=== Phylogeny ===
==== Internal phylogeny ====
After Legg, 2016.

- - Outgroups
  - Marrellomorpha
    - Marrellida
      - Marrella splendens
      - Mimetasteridae
        - Furca bohemica
        - - Moroccan marrellid ("Furca mauretanica")
          - Mimetaster hexagonalis
    - Acercostraca
      - Skania fragilis
      - - Primicaris larvaformis
        - - "Skania" sundbergi
          - Vachonisiidae
            - Enosiaspis hrungnir
            - - Xylokorys chledophilia
              - Vachonisia rogeri

After Moysiuk et al., 2022.

- - - - Marrellomorpha
        - - Marrellida
            - - - "Mimetaster" florestaensis
                - Furca bohemica
              - - Mimetaster hexagonalis
                - Tomlinsonus dimitrii
              - Moroccan marrellid ("Furca mauretanica")
            - Marrella
          - - - Palaeoisopus
              - Haliestes
            - Aquilonifer
        - Acercostraca
          - - - Vachonisia
              - Xylokorys
            - Enosiaspis
          - - Skania
            - Primicaris
      - Eoredlichia
      - Mollisonia
    - - Waptia
      - Tokummia
  - Kylinxia

==== External phylogeny ====
Implied weights maximum parsimony phylogeny of Arthropoda after Liu et al. 2025, which recovered "Marrellomorpha" as a paraphyletic group at the base of Artiopoda (the group which includes trilobites and their relatives), related to Mandibulata.

- Arthropoda
  - †Radiodonta (e.g. Anomalocaris)
  - Deuteropoda
    - - †Megacheira
      - Pan-Chelicerata (sea spiders, horseshoe crabs, arachnids, etc)
    - - - †"Great appendage bivalved forms"
        - †Isoxyida
      - - - †Marrellida
          - - †Acercostraca
            - †Artiopoda (including Trilobita)
        - Mandibulata
          - - †Fuxianhuiida
            - Myriapoda (millipedes, centipedes, etc)
          - - Pancrustacea (crustaceans, insects, etc)
            - †Hymenocarina
