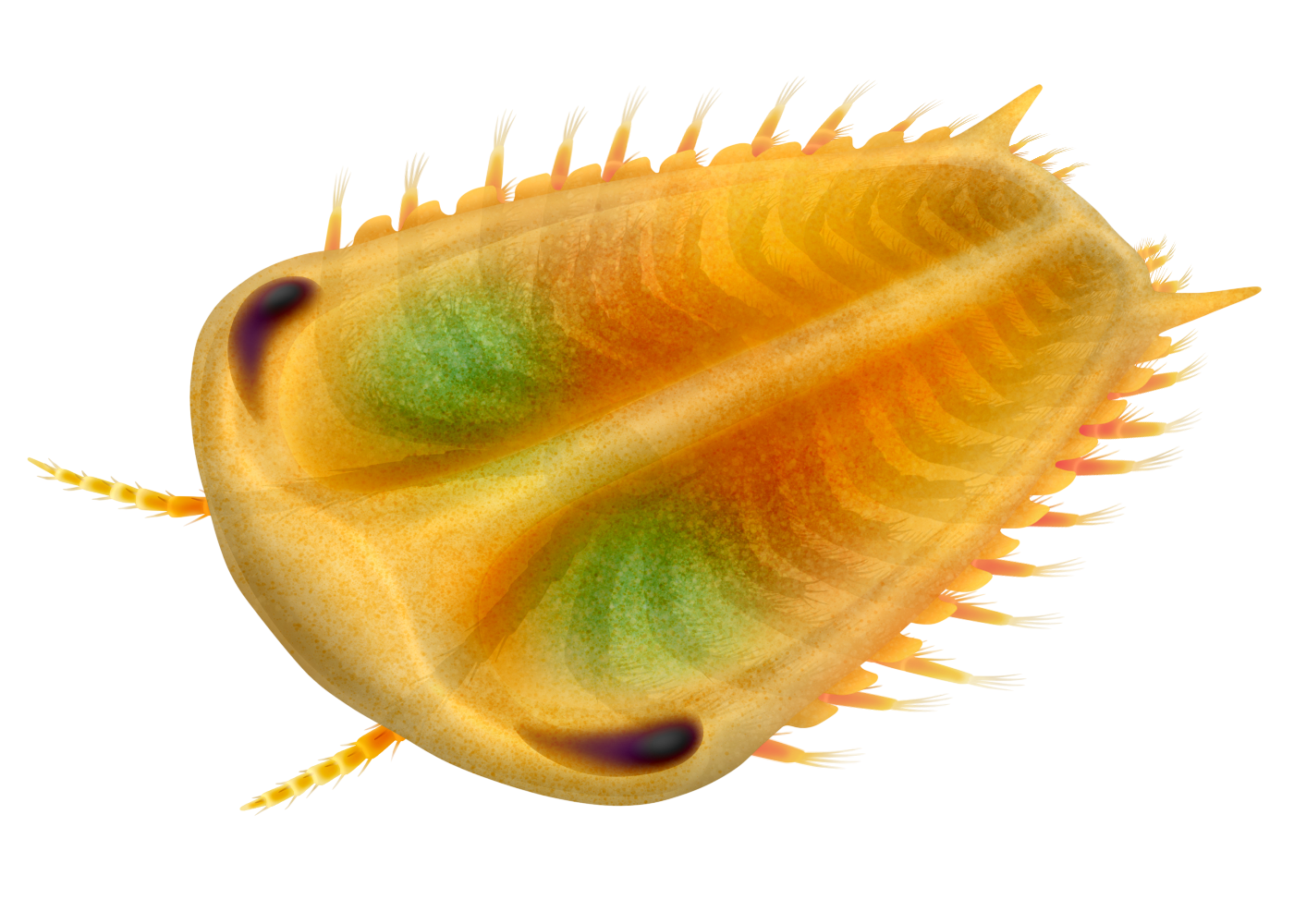
- Reconstruction of Primicaris

Scientific classification
- Kingdom: Animalia
- Phylum: Arthropoda
- Class: †Marrellomorpha
- Order: †Acercostraca
- Genus: †Primicaris; Zhang et al., 2003
- Species: †P. larvaformis

Binomial name
- †Primicaris larvaformis Zhang et al., 2003

= Primicaris =

Primicaris Temporal range: Cambrian Cambrian Stage 3–Miaolingian

Extinct Genus of Cambrian Arthropod

Primicaris is an extinct genus of arthropod from the Cambrian-aged Chengjiang biota of China and the Burgess Shale of Canada. It contains a single described species, P. larvaformis.

== Description ==
Diagrammatic reconstruction of Primicaris

Specimens range from 2.08 to 6.04 millimetres (3/32 to 1/4 in) in length, and 1.50 and 4.20 millimetres (1/16 and 5/32 in) in maximum width. The undivided subovate-shaped dorsal shield covered the entire body, and wrapped around the front edge of the carapace, forming a doublure structure. The midline of the carapace exhibited thickening. Along the outer side edges of the dorsal shield run up to 12 pairs of spines. On the outer front edges of the top of the dorsal shield, there are bulges that are assumed to correspond to the location of eyes. Attached to the underside of the head is a pair of slender uniramous (unbranched) segmented antennae, which have at least 15 segments (podomeres) and bear spine-like setae (bristle or hair-like structures) on the outer segments. Also on the underside of the head is a hypostome-labrum complex, housing a muscular pharynx. The interior of the body houses a J-shaped gut tract. Attached to the body there are up to fourteen pairs of biramous (two branched) limbs, which all share a similar morphology, but progressively decrease in size posteriorly. The basal segments (protopodites) to which the two branches of the biramous limb connect, are covered in 10 robust inwards facing spines, forming a gnathobase. The endopods (inner, leg like branches) of these biramous limbs are made of seven segments/podomeres, each ending with a claw composed of four spines. The first five segments of the endopods each bear four to six inward facing (endite) spines. The exopods (outer branches of the biramous limbs), are around 43% longer than their corresponding endopods, and are composed of 10 podomeres/segments, with the segments becoming more elongate towards the tips of the exopods. Each of the first nine exopod segments bears four two six inward facing (enditic) setae, while the tenth terminal segment bears two to four setae, with the exopod setae collectively forming a comb-like structure.

== Taxonomy ==
Prior to the naming of the genus and species in 2003, specimens were once thought to be meraspids (juvenile stage individuals) of Naraoia spinosa. The original 2003 description speculated that Primicaris may be related to the superficially similar Ediacaran taxon Parvancorina, though this suggestion was subsequently rejected. Although their phylogenetic position within Arthropoda was historically considered "problematic", recent studies have suggested them to be marrellomorphs belonging to the subgroup Acercostraca. Although originally only known from the Chengjiang biota of Yunnan, China, in 2014 additional specimens were reported from the Burgess Shale of British Columbia, Canada, which were assigned to Primicaris cf. larvaformis.

Cladogram of Acercostraca after Liu et al. (2025).

- Acercostraca
  - - - Vachonisia
      - Xylokorys
    - Enosiaspis
  - - Skania
    - Primicaris

== See also ==
- Arthropod
- Cambrian explosion
- List of Chengjiang Biota species by phylum
- Paleobiota of the Burgess Shale
