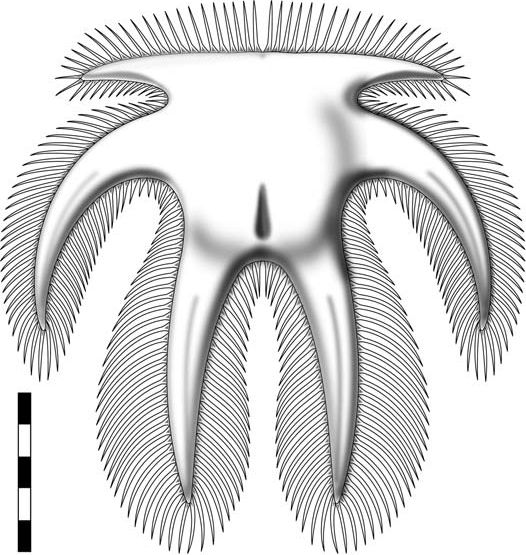
- Reconstruction of the headshield of Furca bohemica

Scientific classification
- Kingdom: Animalia
- Phylum: Arthropoda
- Class: †Marrellomorpha
- Order: †Marrellida
- Genus: †Furca; Fritsch, 1908

Type species
- Furca bohemica Fritsch, 1908

Species
- Furca bohemica Fritsch, 1908 "Furca mauretanica" Van Roy, 2006 (nomen nudum)

= Furca (genus) =

Furca Temporal range: Upper Ordovician 458–453 Ma

Extinct genus of arthropods

Furca (Latin for "fork") is an extinct genus of marrellomorph arthropod known from the Sandbian stage (upper Ordovician period) of the Czech Republic, with a single currently described species, Furca bohemica. A tentative additional species, "Furca mauretanica" was proposed for specimens discovered in Morocco, but this species remains a nomen nudum until formally published, and probably belongs in a new separate genus.

== Description ==
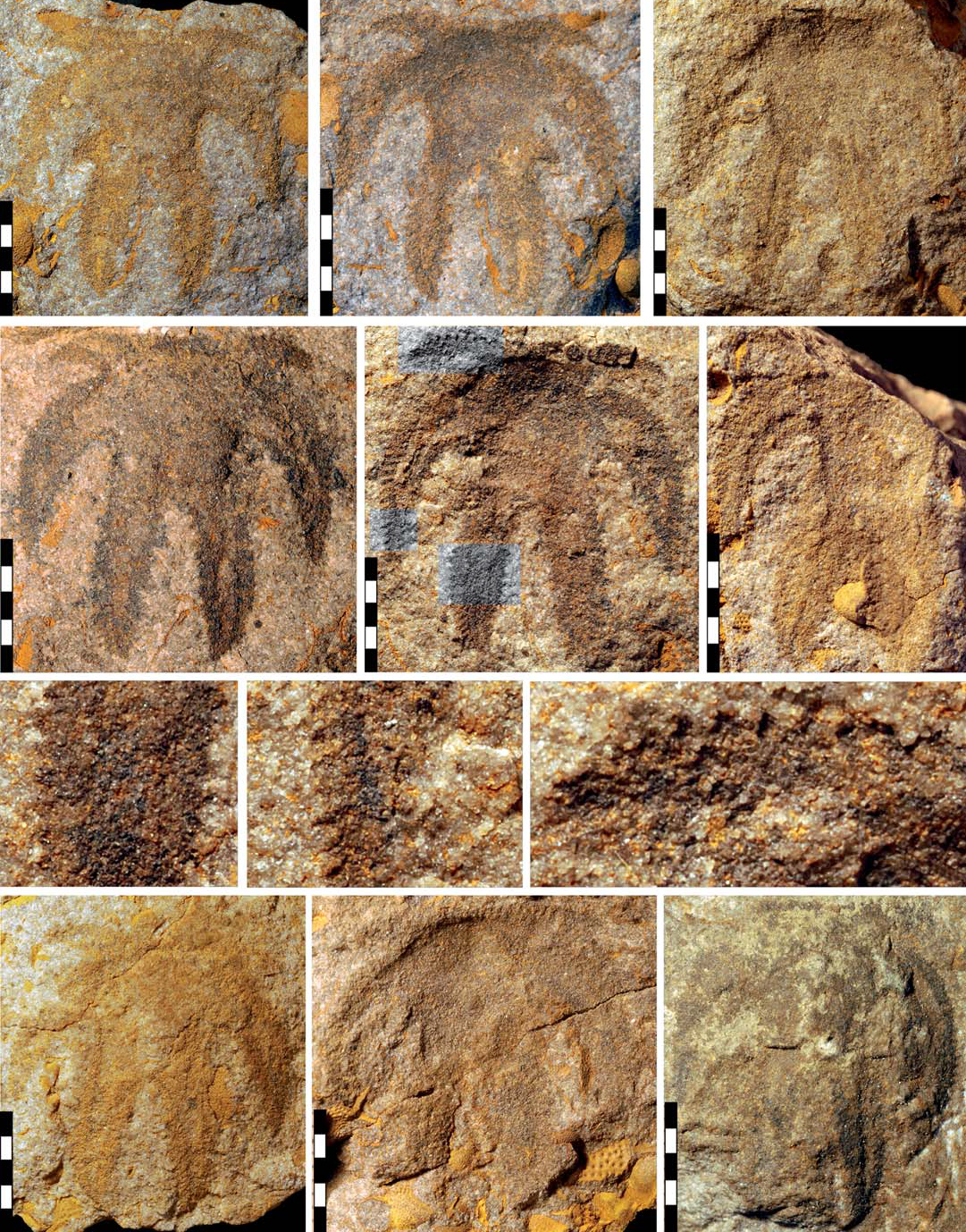
Specimens of Furca bohemica at the National Museum of Prague

Furca is characterized by a broad head shield with three pairs of prominent spines: front (anterolateral), side (mediolateral) and rear (posterolateral). The head shield of Furca ranged from 21–31 mm (0.83–1.22 in) long and 18–29 mm (0.71–1.14 in) at maximum width. The mediolateral spines are long and strongly curved. The outline of the head shield possess a fringe of small, gently curving secondary spines, between 1.5–7 mm (0.059–0.276 in) long. Appendages are unknown from fossils.

== Paleobiology ==
Furca fossils have been found in sediments indicative of shallow marine habitats. Since appendages and other body parts are unknown, no firm conclusions can be made of the biology of Furca. However, comparisons to other marrellomorphs and living arthropods such as horseshoe crabs suggest a benthic marine lifestyle, dwelling on the sea floor.

== Classification ==
With its unusual anatomy, Furca has a colorful taxonomic history. The first specimens were discovered by Joachim Barrande, who named them Furca bohemica (Latin for "Bohemian fork") but did not formally publish descriptions. The specimens were not illustrated until 1847, when they were interpreted as the hypostome of the trilobite Prionocheilus. Antonin Fritsch was the first to formally describe Furca as a distinct taxon, interpreting F. bohemica as a larval echinoderm in 1908. In 1919, F. bohemica was, for the first time, interpreted as an arthropod. A second species, F. pilosa was described in 1999, as well as an unnamed species simply called "Furca sp.". In 2013, Rak and colleagues suggested that F. pilosa and all previously named species were synonyms of Furca bohemica.

Furca bohemica is assigned to the marrellomorph clade Marrellida. While historicaly placed in Mimetasteridae alongside Mimetaster, other studies have disputed this placement.

=== "Furca mauretanica" ===
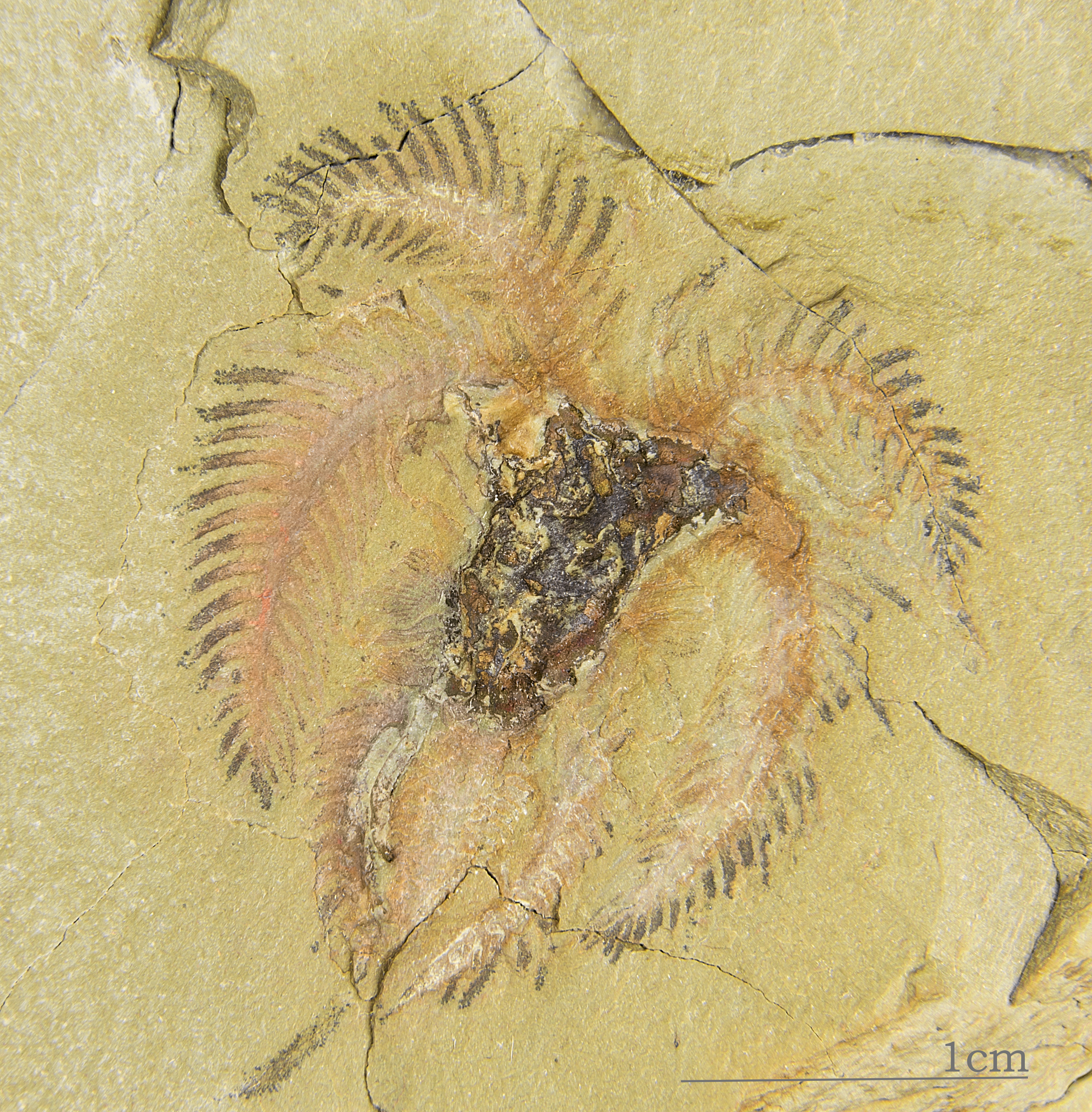
Fossil of "Furca mauretanica", currently a nomen nudum that likely belongs in a new genus

A tentative additional species, "Furca mauretanica" (also spelled "mauritanica") from the early Ordovician (Floian stage) Fezouata Formation of Morocco, was proposed in a doctoral thesis in 2006 and subsequently referred to as "probably belonging to the genus Furca". However, the name has yet to be formally published and so remains a nomen nudum. Phylogenetic analyses have recovered it as distinct marrellid taxon not closely related to Furca bohemica, and thus probably should be placed in a separate genus.

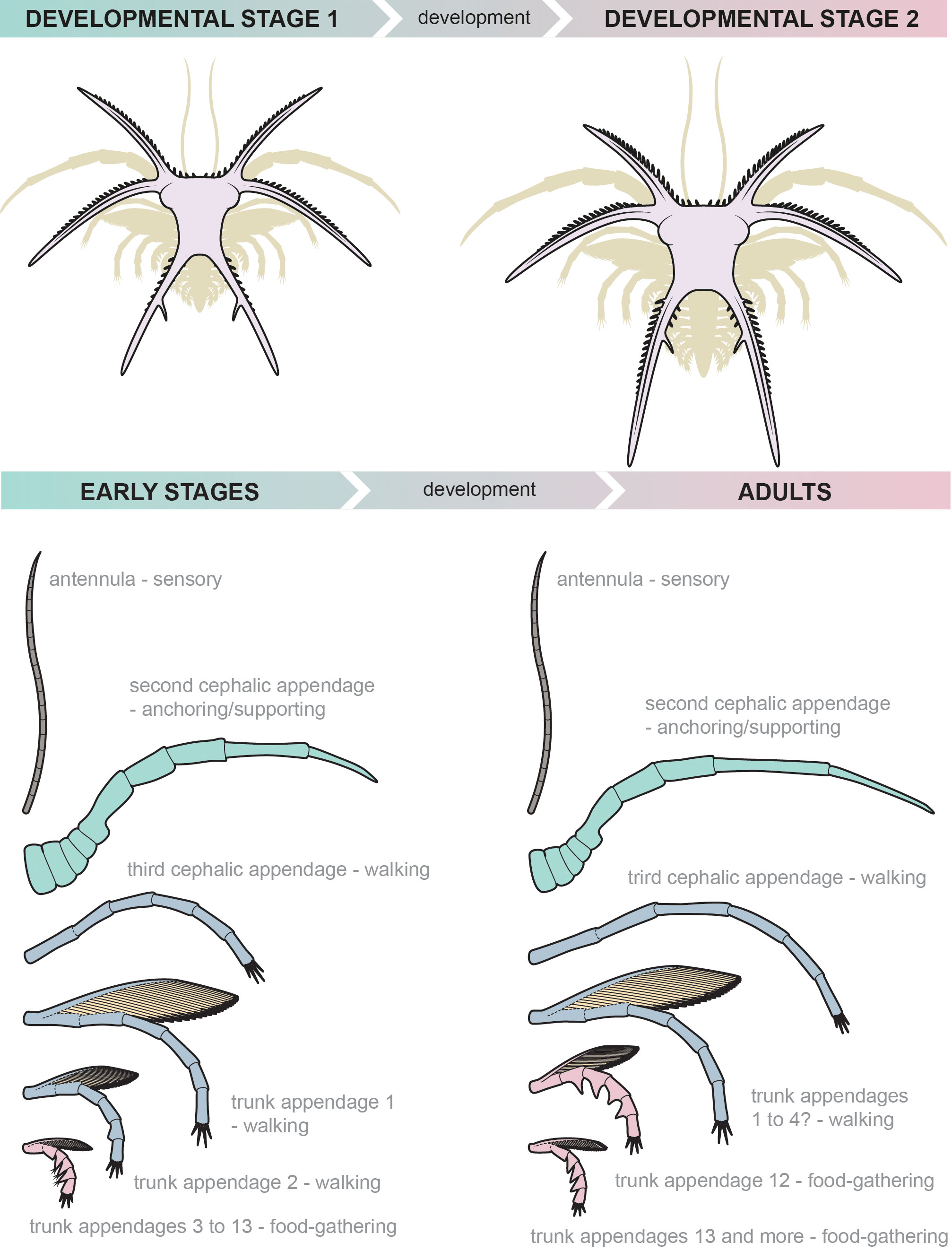
Diagram showing changes in head shield shape between an early juvenile (Stage 1) and a later juvenile (Stage 2) of "Furca mauretanica", with silhouetted trunk and limb morphology (top) and a diagram of changes between the limb shape in juvenile and adult "Furca mauretanica" (bottom)

Despite not having been formally named, some research has been published on the morphology and ecology of "Furca mauretanica". The species has a head shield with three pairs of elongate, curved spines, which themselves have numerous secondary spines. Preserved trunk sections (which indicate that the total number of segments reached over 22 in mature individuals) and limbs are also known, which shows that like Mimetaster and Tomlinsonus, it had a pair of segmented sensory antennae, as well as two other large uniramous (single branched) limbs attached to the head (cephalon). The second (counting the antennae as the first) pair of cephalic appendage was the largest of all the limbs, with nine segments (podomeres) of varying length, with this limb likely served an anchoring or supporting purpose. The third cephalic/head appendage was a six segmented appendage with cylindrical segments, with the tip of the last segment bearing four elongate spines. This appendage was likely used for walking.

These were followed by a smaller pairs of biramous (two-branched) limbs running along the cylindrically segmented trunk, one pair associated with each segment, with the limbs like their associated trunk segments decreasing in size posteriorly. The first few pairs of endopods (lower leg-like branches) of these biramous limbs each had six segments (podomeres) which were long and cylindrical in shape, while the podomeres of posterior pairs were short, and were often equipped with triangular shaped downward facing projections (endites), which were often nearly the size of the rest of the podomere. At least some of these endites bore setae (hair-like structures) in juveniles, but these setae appear to be absent in adults. Like the second non-antennal head appendage, the tips of the biramous trunk limb endopods also bore four elongate spines. The front-most pairs of endopods (the first two pairs of trunk endopods in juveniles and first four trunk endopod pairs in adults) likely served a walking purpose, while the posterior endopods are thought to have served in food gathering. The exopods (upper/outer branches of the biramous limb, which in marrellids likely served for respiration) of the trunk limbs had an annulated appearance, and attached were numerous elongate lamellate setae.

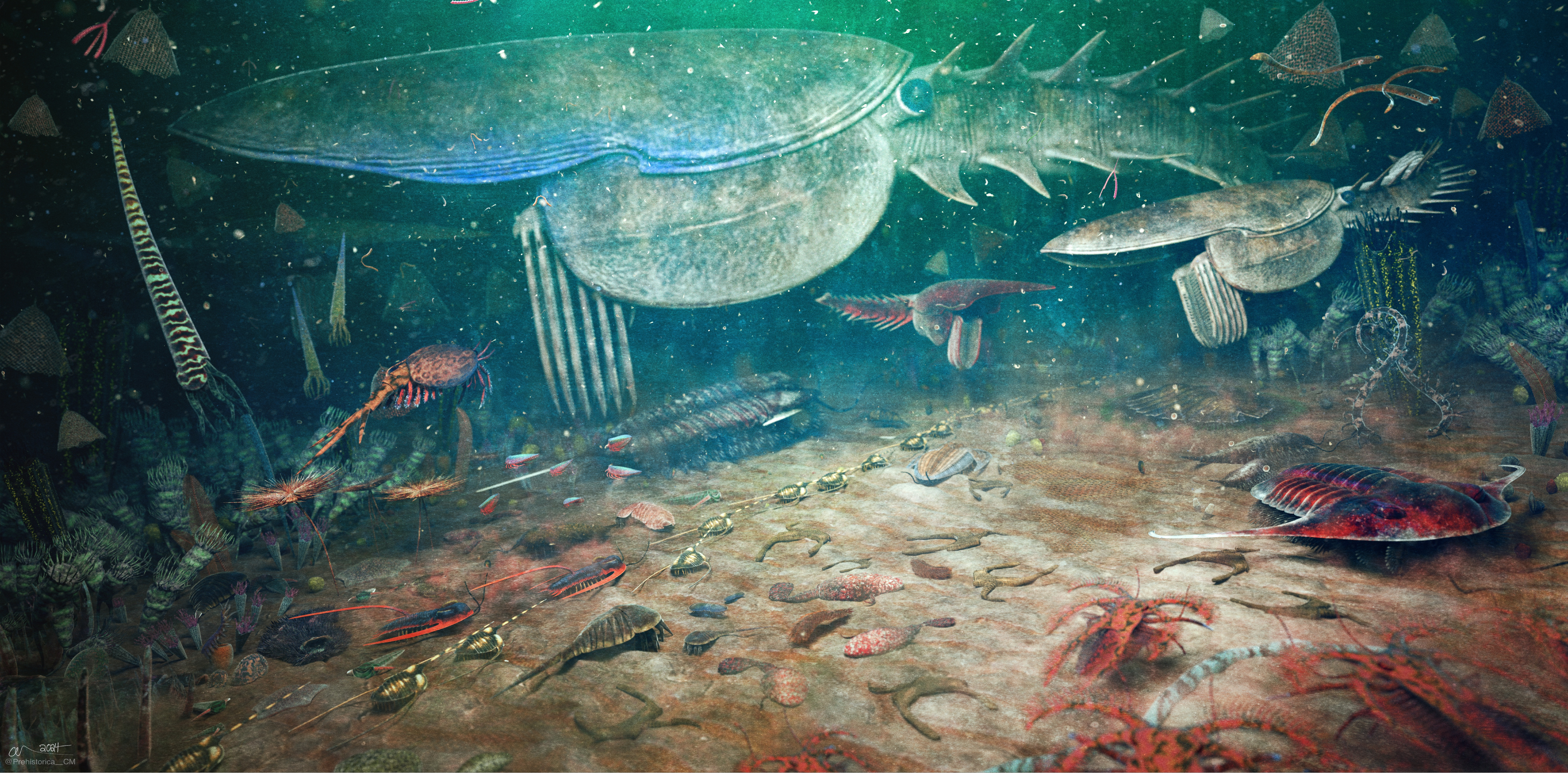
Life restoration of "Furca mauretanica" (bottom right) on the seafloor, alongside other organisms known from the Fezouata Formation

Like most other marrellids, "Furca mauretanica" is thought to have lived on the seafloor, with at least juvenile stages suggested to have fed on detritus and/or algae, using their setae and endites on their posterior trunk appendages to sift particles. Adults, which presumably fed in a similar way, may have fed on larger sized food particles.

Analysis of juvenile and adult individuals shows that the main spines became more pronouncedly curved in older individuals, and that the secondary spines were arranged differently, predominantly only on the forward facing edges of the main spines in juveniles, rather than along both edges as adults. Its ecdysis moulting pattern (which was probably similar to that of lobsters) and the associated suture line where the carapace splits during moulting (which is placed posteriorly on the shield) are distinct from that of the earlier marrellid Marrella (where the suture line was near the front of the shield).

=== Phylogeny ===
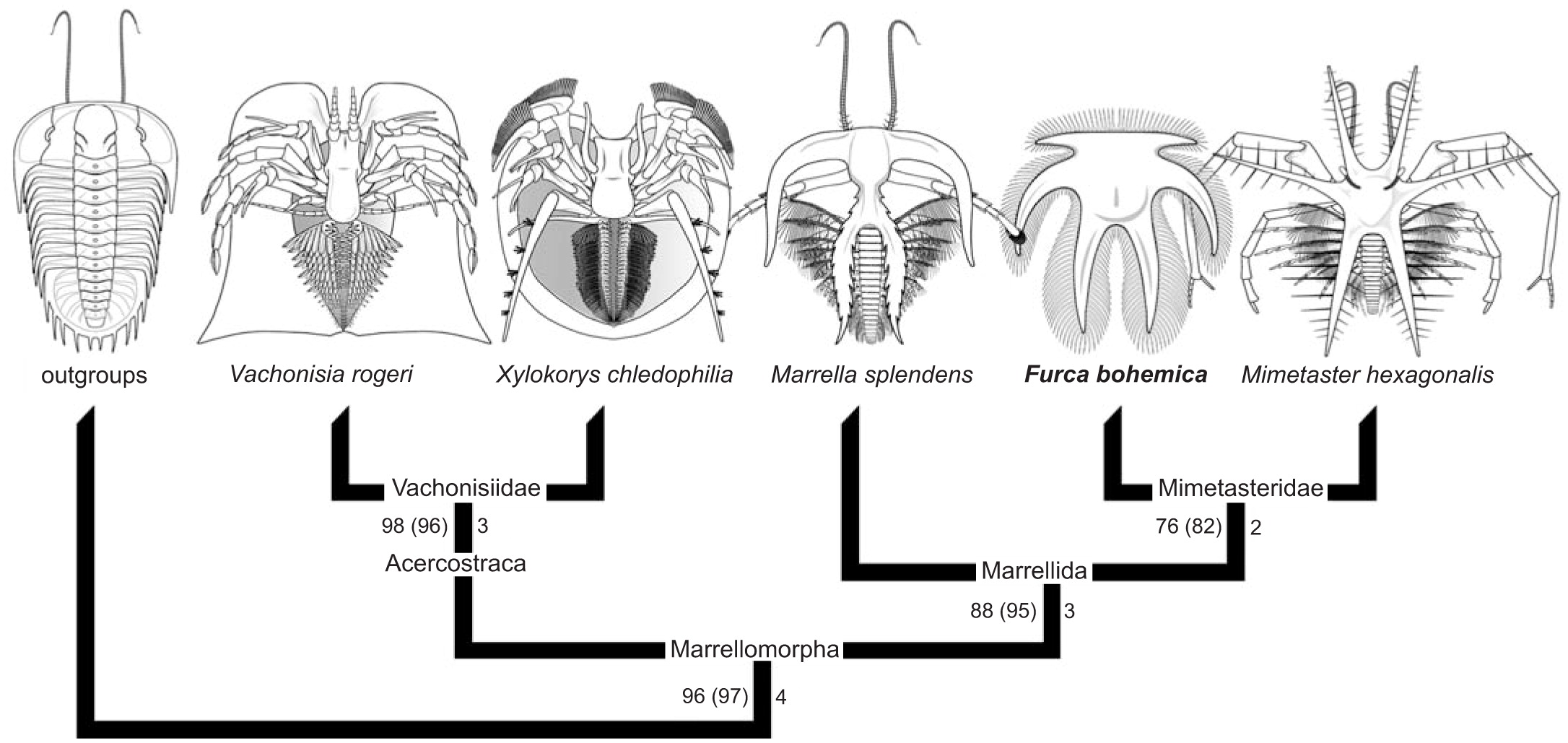
Marrellomorph phylogeny from Rak et al., 2013

Cladogram of Marrellida after Moysiuk et al. 2022

- Marrellida
  - - - "Mimetaster" florestaensis
      - Furca bohemica
    - - Mimetaster hexagonalis
      - Tomlinsonus dimitrii
    - Moroccan marrellid ("Furca mauretanica")
  - Marrella
