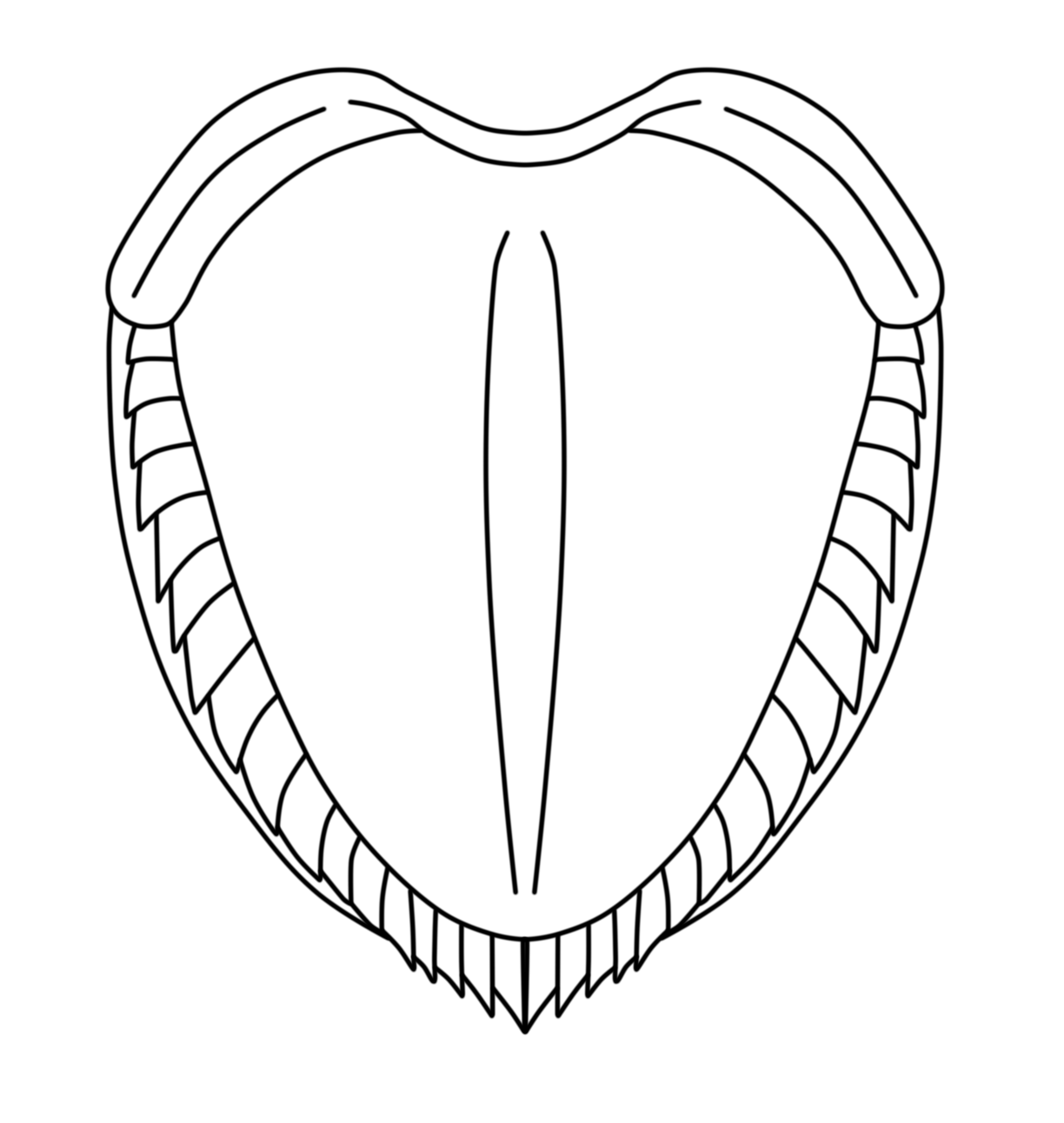
- Reconstruction of E. hrungnir's carapace

Scientific classification
- Kingdom: Animalia
- Phylum: Arthropoda
- Class: †Marrellomorpha
- Order: †Acercostraca
- Family: †Vachonisiidae
- Genus: †Enosiaspis; Legg, 2016
- Species: †E. hrungnir

Binomial name
- †Enosiaspis hrungnir Legg, 2016

= Enosiaspis =

Enosiaspis Temporal range: Ordovician, Tremadocian

Extinct genus of Ordovician arthropod

Enosiaspis is an extinct genus of acercostracan marrellomorph from the Ordovician Fezouata Formation of Morocco. It contains a single described species, E. hrungnir.

== Description ==
Specimens range from 7 to 15 mm in length, with the carapace changing from subcircular to somewhat cordiform (heart-shaped) as size increased. The dorsal surface of the carapace is mostly featureless, although ridges run down the midline and border. The median ridge widens into a triangular node near the front, with the border ridges sharply decreasing in width anteriorly (towards the front) and somewhat curving towards the midline further back. While one specimen, YPM 515471, appears to show dorsal carapace spines these may be from within the ventral border, as shown by similar spines in that location on other specimens. The ventral border of the carapace is prominent but mostly obscured by a doublure-like structure made of rectangular elements, which originate from a more cohesive lacrimiform (teardrop-shaped) doublure near the front. The outer margins of these elements merge with that of the carapace further back.

The body seems to consist of two tagmata separated by appendage type. The first bears stout, possibly biramous antennae which originate from the sides of a rectangular labrum or hypostome-like structure, with what is likely the mouth preserved posteriorly to it. Around the labrum-like structure there are two more pairs of appendages, these ones sigmoidal (S-shaped) with long podomeres. While they may be biramous with possible exites preserved, this is unclear. The fourth pair of appendages on the first tagma are located behind the probable mouth, with their posterior podomere being rectangular and grooved. The second podomere is long with a clavate (club-like) tip, with a distinct geniculation (bend) between it and the third podomere. More distal podomeres are poorly preserved, so the exact count is unclear.

The trunk appendages are poorly preserved, but likely biramous. The probable exopods are very thin, almost filamentous and tightly spaced, with the appendages becoming more compact towards the posterior. Due to their poor preservation, the number is unclear, but at least 16 pairs are known. Assuming the trunk appendages start immediately behind the fourth head appendage like in other acercostracans, there may have been as many as 28 pairs.

== Taxonomy ==
The distinctive carapace shape of Enosiaspis places it firmly within Acercostraca, with the lacrimiform anterior border resembling the doublure in taxa like Primicaris. The carapace shape and appendage count places it within Vachonisiidae, with the wide dorsal border supporting this. Enosiaspis is unique among all acercostracans in the presence of a lateral doublure composed of many elements, with their shape resembling the many cephalic spines on marrellids such as Marrella itself. Enosiaspis shares features of both vachonisiids (appendages and carapace shape), skaniids (lacrimiform doublure, dorsal carapace border) and even marrellids (lateral doublure with many elements), which combined with its position in time between the Cambrian skaniids and Silurian-Devonian vachonisiids place it as a link between the two groups.
