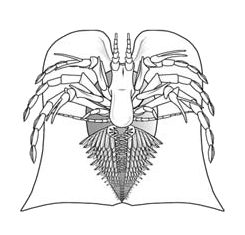
- Ventral view of Vachonisia rogeri (reconstruction)

Scientific classification
- Kingdom: Animalia
- Phylum: Arthropoda
- Class: †Marrellomorpha
- Order: †Acercostraca
- Family: †Vachonisiidae
- Genus: †Vachonisia; Lehmann, 1956
- Species: †V. rogeri

Binomial name
- †Vachonisia rogeri (Lehmann, 1955)

Synonyms
- Vachonia Lehmann, 1955 (preoccupied); Vachonia rogeri Lehmann, 1955

= Vachonisia =

Vachonisia Temporal range: Lower Devonian

Extinct genus of Devonian organisms

Vachonisia is a Devonian marrellomorph known from the Lower Devonian Hunsrück Slate. It grows in a similar fashion to the other Hunsruck marrellomorph, Mimetaster, and is closely related to the Silurian Xylokorys. It is known from 20 specimens; its whole body is covered by a shield-like carapace.
