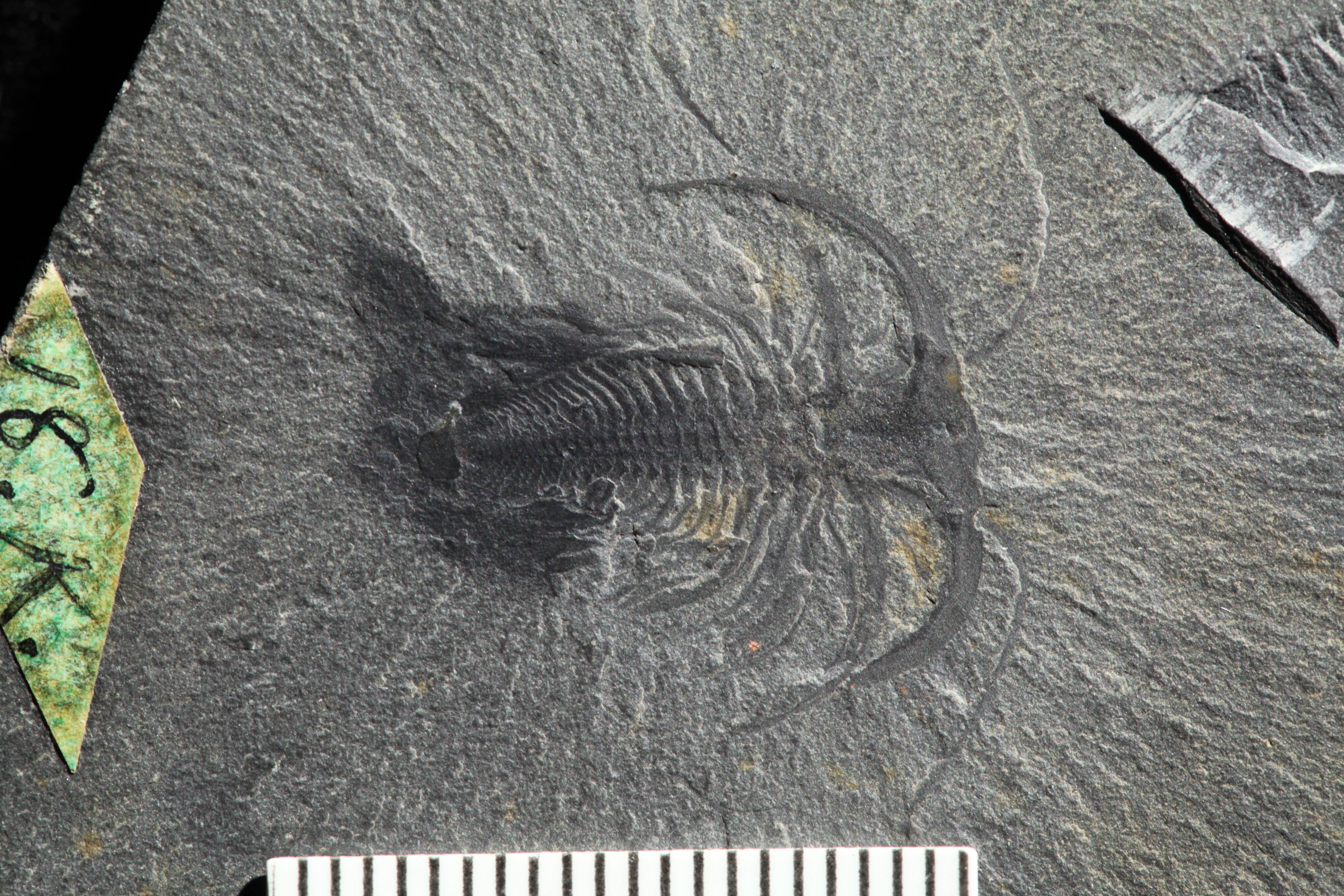
- Fossil lectotype of Marrella, USNM PAL 57674
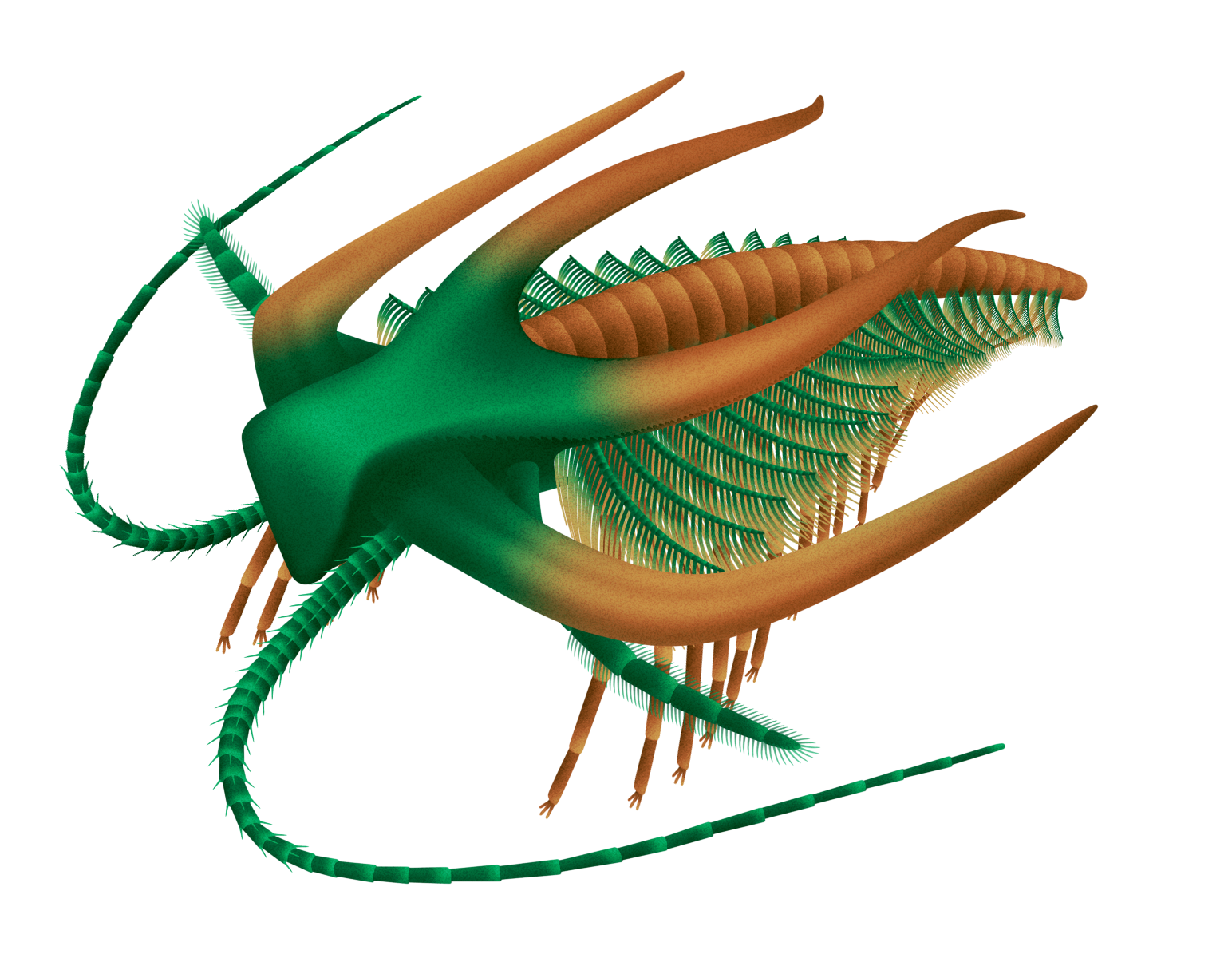
- Life reconstruction of Marrella

Scientific classification
- Kingdom: Animalia
- Phylum: Arthropoda
- Class: †Marrellomorpha
- Order: †Marrellida
- Family: †Marrellidae
- Genus: †Marrella; Walcott, 1912
- Species: †M. splendens

Binomial name
- †Marrella splendens Walcott, 1912

= Marrella =

Marrella Temporal range: 510–505 Ma

Extinct genus of Arthropods

Marrella is an extinct genus of marrellomorph arthropod known from the Middle Cambrian of North America and Asia. It is the most common animal represented in the Burgess Shale of British Columbia, Canada, with tens of thousands of specimens collected. Much rarer remains are also known from deposits in China.

== History ==
Marrella was the first fossil collected by Charles Doolittle Walcott from the Burgess Shale, in 1909. The name is in honor of Dr. John Edward Marr (1857–1933), a British geologist and professor at Cambridge University. Walcott described Marrella informally as a "lace crab" and described it more formally as an odd trilobite. It was later reassigned to the now defunct class Trilobitoidea in the Treatise on Invertebrate Paleontology. In 1971, Whittington undertook a thorough redescription of the animal and, on the basis of its legs, gills and head appendages, concluded that it was neither a trilobite, nor a chelicerate, nor a crustacean.

Marrella is one of several unique arthropod-like organisms found in the Burgess Shale. Other examples are Opabinia and Yohoia. The unusual and varied characteristics of these creatures were startling at the time of discovery. The fossils, when described, helped to demonstrate that the soft-bodied Burgess fauna was more complex and diverse than had previously been anticipated.

== Morphology ==
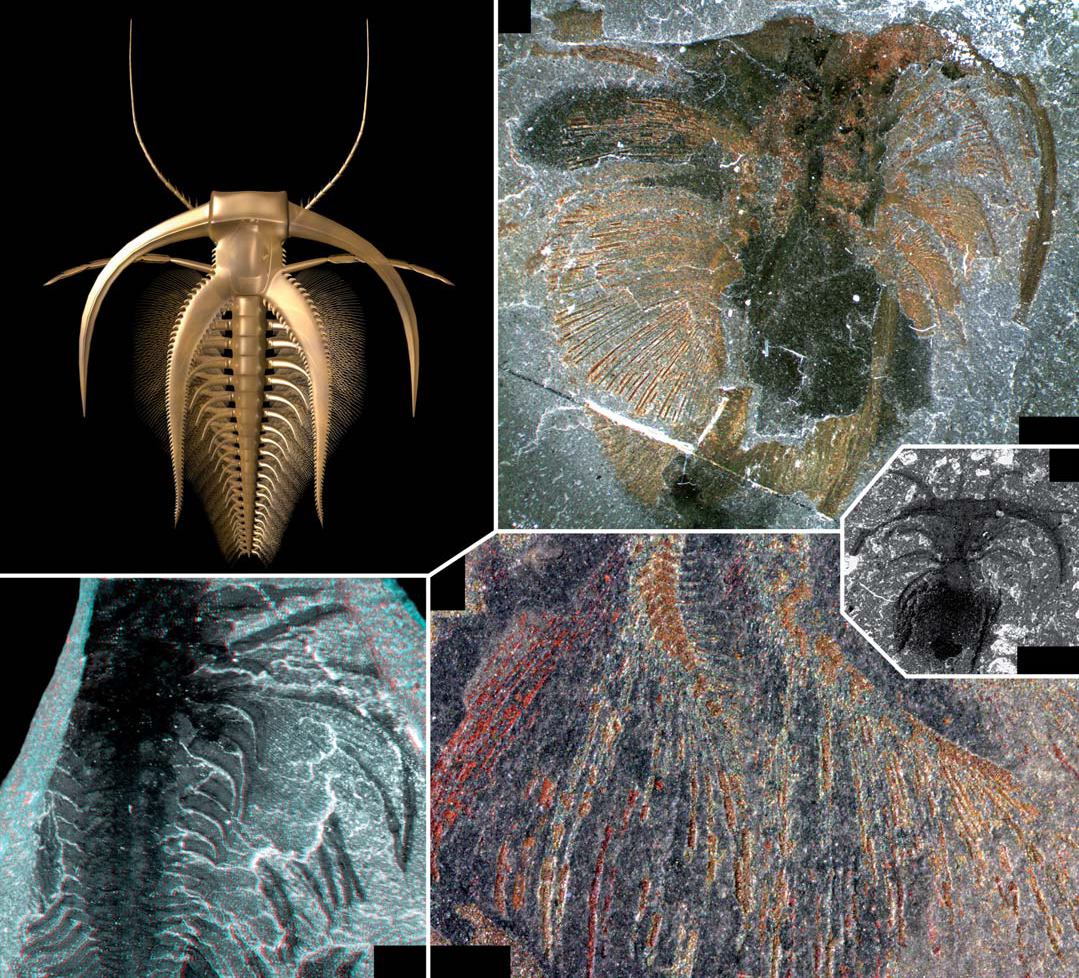
Marrella splendens by Haug et al. 2012 Top left– dorsal view on a rendered 3D model top right and centre right– micrographs under polarized light top right – well preserved specimen USNM 83486f with the exopods in a "rusty" preservation (cf. García−Bellido and Collins 2006) bottom left – stereo image of specimen USNM 139665. Exopods of preceding limbs are super−imposing each other, separated by a thin layer of sediment bottom right – detail of specimen ROM 56766A in "rusty" preservation. Here the spines on the lateral side of the exopod ringlets are well preserved centre right – one of the smallest specimens of M. splendens USNM 219817e that possesses preserved appendage remains Black bars for centre right image = 0.6mm, rest = 1mm

Specimens of Marrella range from 2.4 to 24.5 millimetres (3/32 to 31/32 in) in length. The head shield had two pairs of long posteriorly curved projections/spines, the posterior pair of which had a serrated keel. There is no evidence of eyes. On the underside of the head was a pair of long and sweeping flexible antennae, composed of about total 30 segments, projecting forward at an angle of 15 to 30 degrees away from the midline. On part of the antennae, the joints between segments bear setae (hair-like structures). Behind and slightly above the antennae attached a pair of short and stout paddle-like swimming appendages, composed of one long basal segment and five shorter segments, the edges of the latter of which were fringed with setae.

The body had a minimum of 17 segments (tagma), increasing to over 26 segments in larger specimens, each with a pair of biramous (two-branched) appendages. The lower branches of each appendage (the endopod) were elongate and leg-like with 5 segments/podomeres excluding the basal segment/basipod, with the terminal segments being tipped with claws. The endopods sequentially decreased in size posteriorly, with the size reduction accelerating beyond the 9th pair. The upper branch (the exopod), which functioned as gill was segmented and bore thin filamentous structures. There is a tiny, button-like telson at the end of the thorax.

A 1998 paper suggested that striations present on the front projection of well-preserved specimens of Marrella represented a diffraction grating pattern, that in life would have resulted in an iridescent sheen. However the conclusions of the paper regarding other animals with supposed iridescent diffraction gratings have been questioned by other authors. Dark stains are often present at the posterior regions of specimens, probably representing extruded waste matter or hemolymph. A single specimen caught in the act of ecdysis (moulting) is known, which shows that the exoskeleton split at the front of the shield.

== Ecology ==
Marrella is likely to have been an active swimmer that swam close to the seafloor (nektobenthic) with its swimming appendages used in a backstroke motion, with the large spines acting as stabilizers, as well as possibly also having a defensive function. They have been suggested to be filter feeders, with food particles sifted out of the water column by the posterior appendages during swimming before being passed forward by the appendages towards the mouth.

== Taxonomy ==
Marrella is placed within the Marrellida clade of the Marrellomorpha, a group of arthropods with uncertain affinities known from the Cambrian to Devonian. Within the Marrellida, is it placed as the most basal known member of the group. Cladogram of Marrellida after Moysiuk et al. 2022

- Marrellida
  - - - "Mimetaster" florestaensis
      - Furca bohemica
    - - Mimetaster hexagonalis
      - Tomlinsonus dimitrii
    - Moroccan marrellid ("Furca mauretanica")
  - Marrella

== Occurrence ==
Marrella is the most abundant genus in the Burgess Shale. Most Marrella specimens herald from the 'Marrella bed', a thin horizon, but it is common in most other outcrops of the shale. Over 25,000 specimens have been collected. 5028 specimens of Marrella are known from the Greater Phyllopod bed, where they comprise 9.56% of the community.

A few dozen specimens of an indeterminate species of Marrella have been reported from the Kaili Formation of Yunnan, China, dating to the Wuliuan stage of the Cambrian. A single fragmentary specimen of an indeterminate species is also known from the Balang Formation of Yunnan, China, dating to Cambrian Stage 4. Both deposits are earlier than the Burgess Shale.

== See also ==
- Paleobiota of the Burgess Shale
