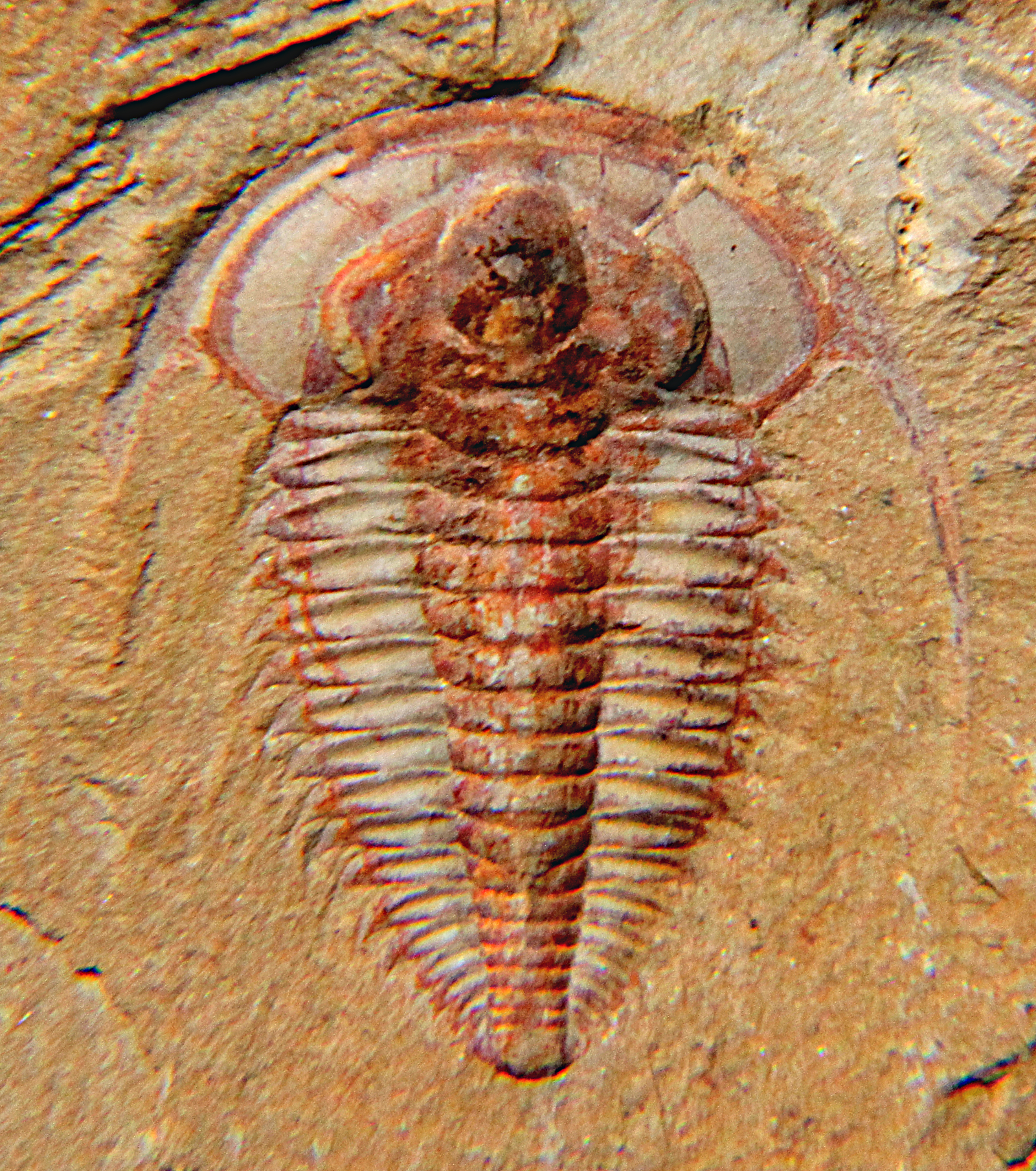
- Eoredlichia intermedia, collected near Chengjiang (Yunnan)

Scientific classification
- Kingdom: Animalia
- Phylum: Arthropoda
- Clade: †Artiopoda
- Class: †Trilobita
- Order: †Redlichiida
- Family: †Redlichiidae
- Subfamily: †Pararedlichiinae
- Genus: †Eoredlichia; Chang, 1950

Type species
- E. intermedia (Lu, 1940)

Synonyms
- Redlichia intermedia; Redlichia walcotti; Saukiandops walcotti; Archaeops lui; Galloredlichia noiri; Pararedlichia pulchella

= Eoredlichia =

Eoredlichia Temporal range: Late Atdabanian,518–515 Ma

Extinct genus of trilobites

Eoredlichia is an extinct genus of trilobite of average to large size (up to 12 centimetres or 4.7 inches long, or 20 centimetres or 7.9 inches when including the spine on the ninth thorax segment pointing horizontally to the back, that itself equals the main body length). It lived during the early Cambrian (late Atdabanian) in the Chengjiang fauna of Yunnan, China, and in Australia and Thailand. Eoredlichia is compounded of the Greek ἠώς (eos, dawn) and Redlichia, a later but related genus, so it means "early Redlichia". The species epithet intermedia means intermediate, indicating it is morphologically intermediate between other species. Eofallotaspis gives rise to Lemdadella, and thence to Eoredlichia and the other Redlichiidae.

== Description ==
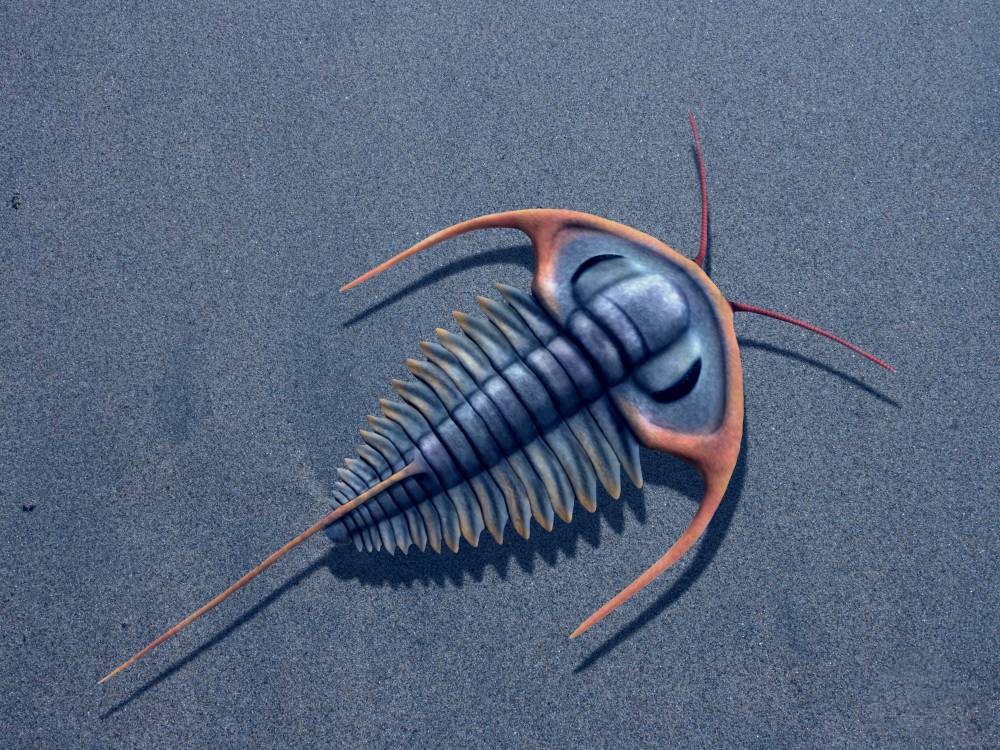
Restoration of Eoredlichia intermedia

=== Dorsal exoskeleton ===
Like most early trilobites, Eoredlichia was very flat, was thinly calcified and had sickle-shaped eye ridges. Like all other Redlichiina it had opisthoparian sutures, and a small tailshield or pygidium. The headshield or (cephalon) is about twice as wide as long (along the midline), spindle-shaped, bluntly pointed at the base of the genal spines, and straight where it connects with the thorax. The central area of the cephalon, that is called glabella, is tapering forward and has three crossing furrows. The genal spines grow from the cephalon at about mid-length outwards and backwards at an angle of about 30° at base, gradually bending till parallel to the midline at its tip approximately perpendicular to where thorax and pygidium meet. The thorax has fifteen segments, with number 9 (counted from the front) carrying a spine approximately as long as the entire main body.

=== Appendages ===
This species is one of the few for which antennae, legs and gills (together the so-called biramous appendages), and the alimentary tract are known. The unbranched, slim, whip-like (or setaceous) antennae are about a third of the body length, and consist of 46–50 rings of gradually decreasing width. Each ring carries a fine hair on the side of the midline. Like in all other adult trilobites for which the appendages are known, each consists of a common basis (hip or coxa), a leg (or endopod) and a gill (or exopod), in Eoredlichia 21 pair in all. The coxa carries spines towards the midline and each pair of opposing coxae is presumed to have functioned as jaws (or gnathobases). The endopod consists of seven leg segments (called podomeres), the last of which is forked to form a claw, that would help it to keep its footing. The basal podomere of the exopod was connected along its entire length with the coxa through a hinge joint. To the back, each exopod carries about forty thin long filaments, that probably acted as gills, and short setae along the rounded distal lobe. Three pairs of appendages were connected to the underside of the cephalon, one pair connected to each of the fifteen thorax segments and presumably three diminutive pairs under the pygidium. The gut is a straight tube, with nine pairs sacs (or diverticulae), four in the cephalon and five in the thorax. Eoredlichia, like many other Cambrian trilobites, is best interpreted as a scavenger/predator.
