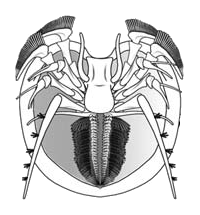

Scientific classification
- Domain: Eukaryota
- Kingdom: Animalia
- Phylum: Arthropoda
- Class: †Marrellomorpha
- Order: †Acercostraca
- Family: †Vachonisiidae
- Genus: †Xylokorys
- Species: †X. chledophilia

Binomial name
- †Xylokorys chledophilia Siveter et al., 2007

= Xylokorys =

Xylokorys Temporal range: Wenlock, 425 Ma

Extinct genus of arthropods

Xylokorys is a genus of marrellomorph known from two specimens from the Silurian Herefordshire lagerstatte; it filter-fed on mud particles on the sea floor. It is the only marrellomorph known from the Silurian period.
