= Hypostome (trilobite) =

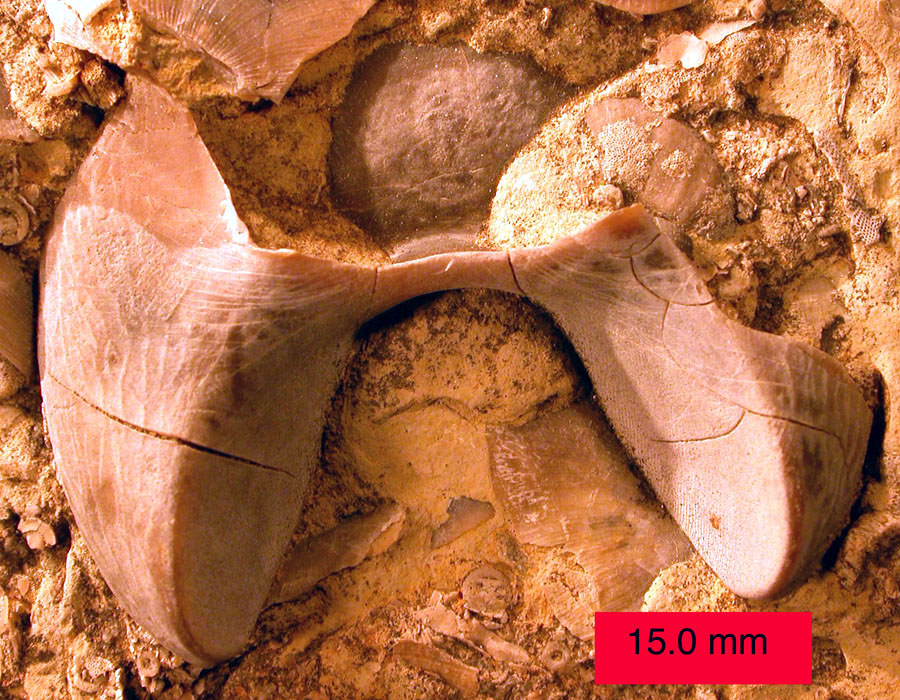
A partially complete, forked, conterminant hypostome of the trilobite Isotelus (Ordovician of southern Ohio).

The hypostome is a plate covering the mouth on the underside of the head in some arthropods, notably including trilobites. In trilobites, The hypostome can be classified into three types based on whether they are permanently attached to the rostrum or not and whether they are aligned to the anterior dorsal tip of the glabella.

== Morphology in trilobites ==
The center of the hypostome is an ovoid, typically convex part called the median body, often divided into an anterior lobe and a posterior lobe. Either side of the median body is a border with various extensions, including anterior and posterior wings, sometimes bearing knob-like processes. The hypostome is hollow, and encloses the mouthparts, the anterior digestive tract, and the bases of the antennae. Trilobite antennae pass through notches between the anterior and posterior wings, then forward. The anterior wings are designed to rest firmly against internal structures (ventral apodemes) on the glabella.

Variation in trilobite hypostome morphology is crucial in modern discussions of trilobite phylogeny. Functional interpretations of hypostome shape also allow for reasonable speculation on the feeding habits of trilobite species.

=== Types ===
Although hypostome morphology is highly variable, three broad types are generally recognized:

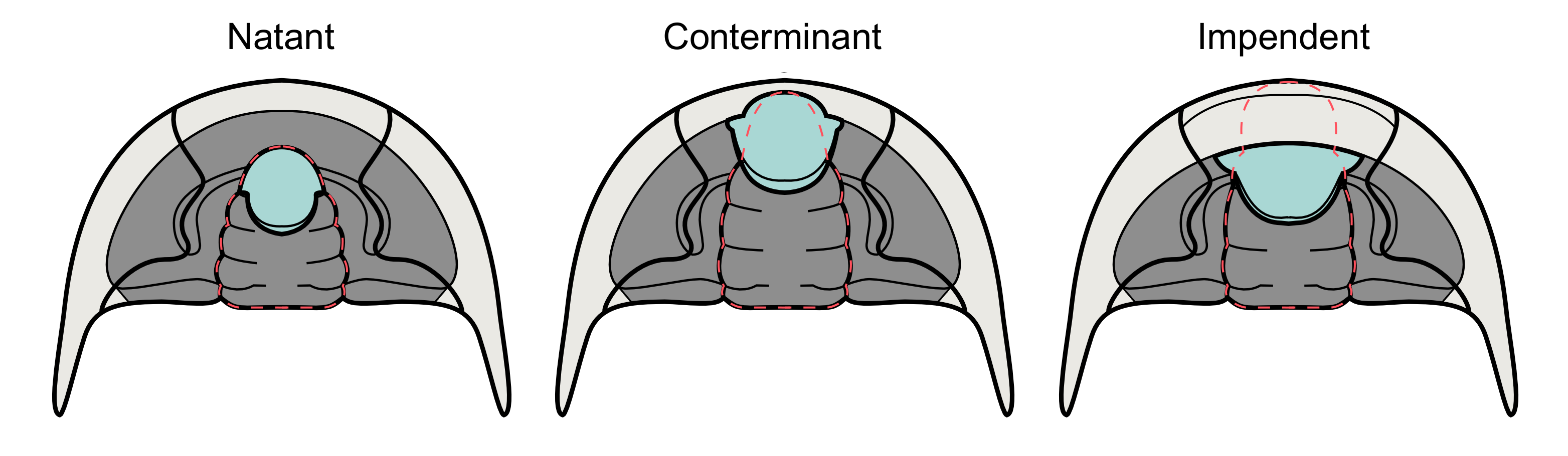
Trilobite hypostome types (in blue)

==== Natant ====
A natant hypostome is not attached to the anterior doublure, with support assumed to be provided by a non-mineralised membrane. Natant hypostomes appear to have been conservative over the course of the evolution of trilobites with overall form and shape of a simple ovoid without posterior extensions or ornamentation. Natant hypostomes are thought to be ancestral to other hypostome forms and thought to belong to trilobites with generalized particle feeding habits (i.e. little need to modify mouth-parts to deal with specialized food items).

==== Conterminant ====
A conterminant hypostome is attached to the anterior doublure, aligned with the front edge of the glabella and found on trilobites thought of as predators. Anchoring the hypostome against the anterior doublure and cephalon provides structural bracing against which to tear apart prey. Different specializations of hypostome form might reflect different kinds of prey, or different feeding behaviors.

==== Impendent ====
An impendent hypostome is attached to the anterior doublure but not aligned with the front edge of the glabella. Many impendent hypostomes have prongs, grooves and other adaptations thought to relate to feeding on complex food sources.

== See also ==
- Mandible (arthropod)
