= List of the Paleozoic life of Utah =

This list of the Paleozoic life of Utah contains the various prehistoric life-forms whose fossilized remains have been reported from within the US state of Utah and are between 538.8 and 252.17 million years of age.

== A ==
- †Acanthopecten
  - †Acanthopecten carboniferus
  - †Acanthopecten coloradoensis
- †Achlysopsis
  - †Achlysopsis liokata – or unidentified comparable form
  - †Achlysopsis punctatum
- †Acidiphorus
  - †Acidiphorus brevis – or unidentified comparable form
  - †Acidiphorus brevus
  - †Acidiphorus brighti
  - †Acidiphorus pseudobathurus
  - †Acidiphorus unicorna – type locality for species
  - †Acidiphorus wahwahensis
  - †Acidiphorus williamsi – type locality for species
- †Acinocricus
  - †Acinocricus stichus
- †Acodus
  - †Acodus similaris
- †Acontiodus
  - †Acontiodus coniformis
- †Acrothele
  - †Acrothele subsidua
- †Acrotreta
- †Adiantites
  - †Adiantites tenuifolius
- †Aesiocrinus
  - †Aesiocrinus secundus – type locality for species
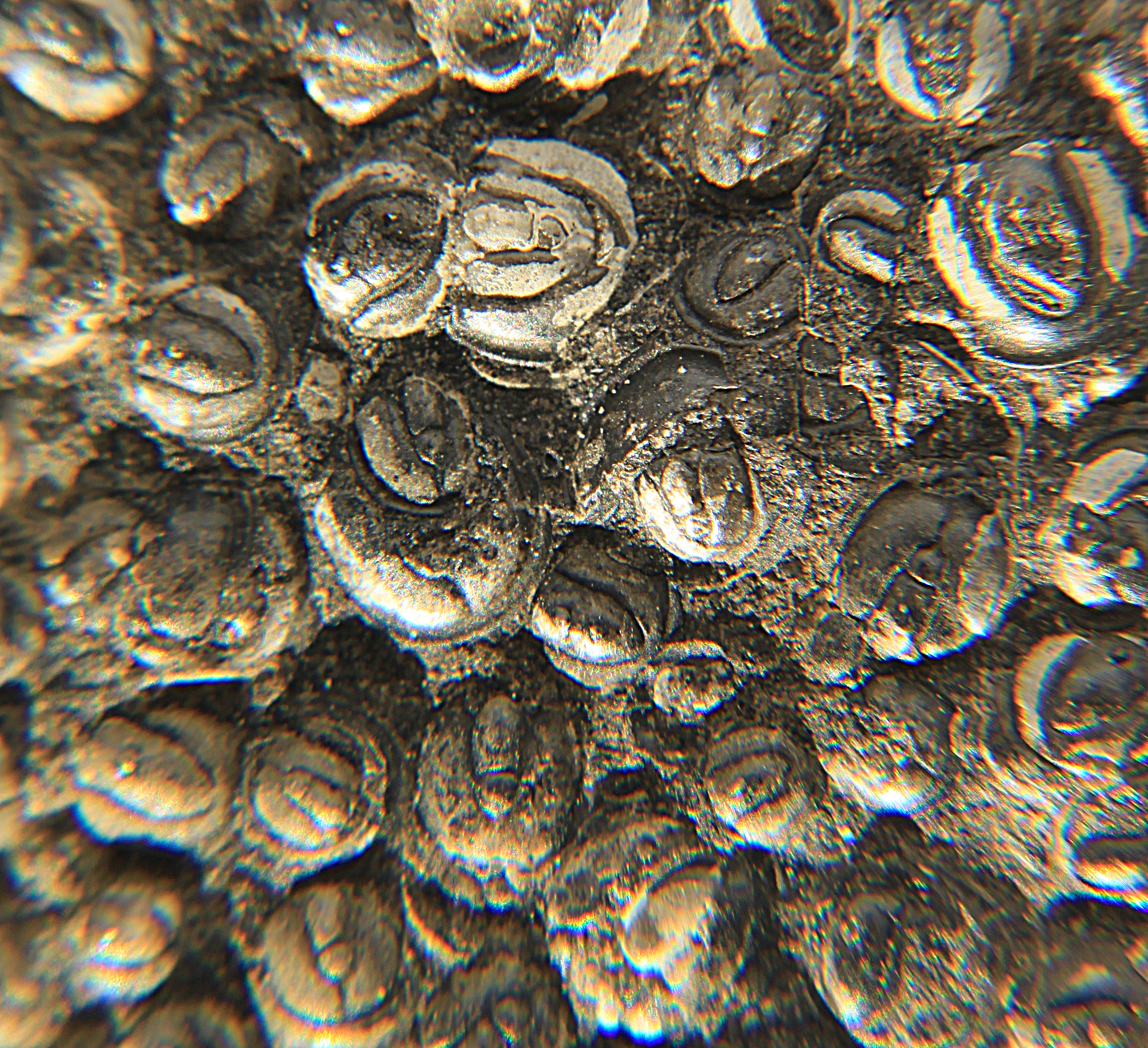
- Assemblage of fossils of the Cambrian trilobite Agnostus
  †Agnostus
  - †Agnostus neglectus
- †Allorisma
- †Allorynchus
- †Alokistocare
  - †Alokistocare carnatum
  - †Alokistocare harrisi
  - †Alokistocare idahoense
  - †Alokistocare normale
  - †Alokistocare subcoronatum
- †Alokistocarella
  - †Alokistocarella brighamensis
- †Altiocculus
  - †Altiocculus concavus
  - †Altiocculus drumensis
- †Amblycranium
  - †Amblycranium cornutum
  - †Amblycranium linearus – type locality for species
  - †Amblycranium variabile
- †Amecephalus
  - †Amecephalus laticudum
- †Ameura – tentative report
- †Ammagnostus
  - †Ammagnostus beltensis
- †Amphiscapha
- †Amplexizaphrentis
  - †Amplexizaphrentis paucicinctus
  - †Amplexizaphrentis spinulosus
  - †Amplexizaphrentis subcrassus
- †Amplexocarina
- †Amplexus
- †Anabarochilna
  - †Anabarochilna australis – or unidentified comparable form
- †Ananias
  - †Ananias nevadensis – or unidentified related form
- †Ancillotoechia
  - †Ancillotoechia perryi – type locality for species
- †Anemonaria
  - †Anemonaria delicatula
- †Angulotreta
- †Angyomphalus
  - †Angyomphalus regularis
- †Anidanthus
  - †Anidanthus echaris
- †Anisopyge
- †Anisotrypa
- †Annularia
  - †Annularia stellata
- †Annulispongia – type locality for genus
  - †Annulispongia interrupta – type locality for species
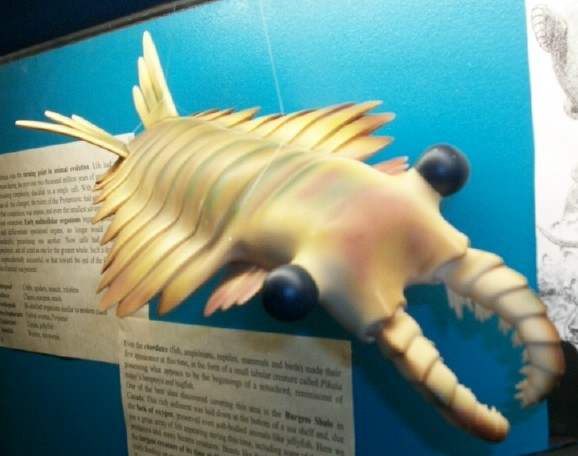
- Restorative model of the Cambrian arthropod Anomalocaris
  †Anomalocaris
  - †Anomalocaris nathorsti
- †Anomalorthis
  - †Anomalorthis lambda
  - †Anomalorthis oklahomensis
  - †Anomalorthis utahensis
- †Anomphalus
  - †Anomphalus rotulus
- †Anthaspidella
- †Anthracospirifer
  - †Anthracospirifer increbescens
  - †Anthracospirifer leidyi
  - †Anthracospirifer occiduus
- †Antiquatonia
  - †Antiquatonia portlockianus
  - †Antiquatonia sulcatus – or unidentified comparable form
- †Apachella
- †Apatognathus
- †Aphelaspis
  - †Aphelaspis haguei
- †Aphelotoxon
  - †Aphelotoxon acuminata
- †Apheoorthis
  - †Apheoorthis melita – or unidentified comparable form
- †Apheorthis
  - †Apheorthis meeki – or unidentified comparable form
- †Archaeocalamites
  - †Archaeocalamites scrobiculatus
- †Archaeocothurnus – tentative report
  - †Archaeocothurnus bifida – type locality for species
- †Archaeoscyphia
  - †Archaeoscyphia rossi
- †Archeocalamites
  - †Archeocalamites radiatus
- †Archeoschyphia
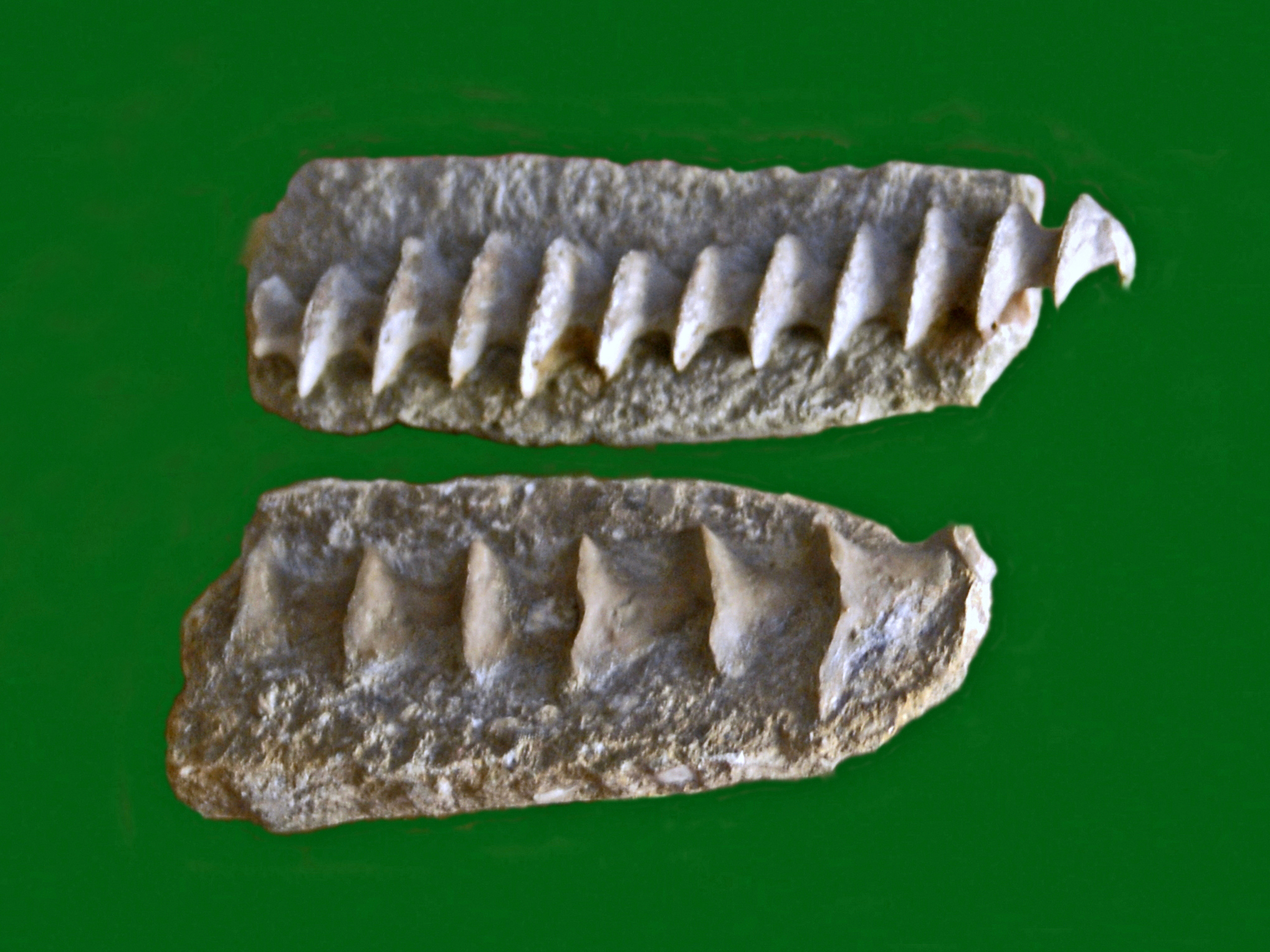
- Fossils of the Carboniferous-Permian bryozoan Archimedes
  †Archimedes
  - †Archimedes macfarlani
  - †Archimedes owenanus
- †Arcuolimbus
- †Arenicolites
- †Arroyocrinus
  - †Arroyocrinus stokesi – type locality for species
- †Arthrophycus – tentative report
- †Artisia
- †Asaphelina
- †Asaphellus – tentative report
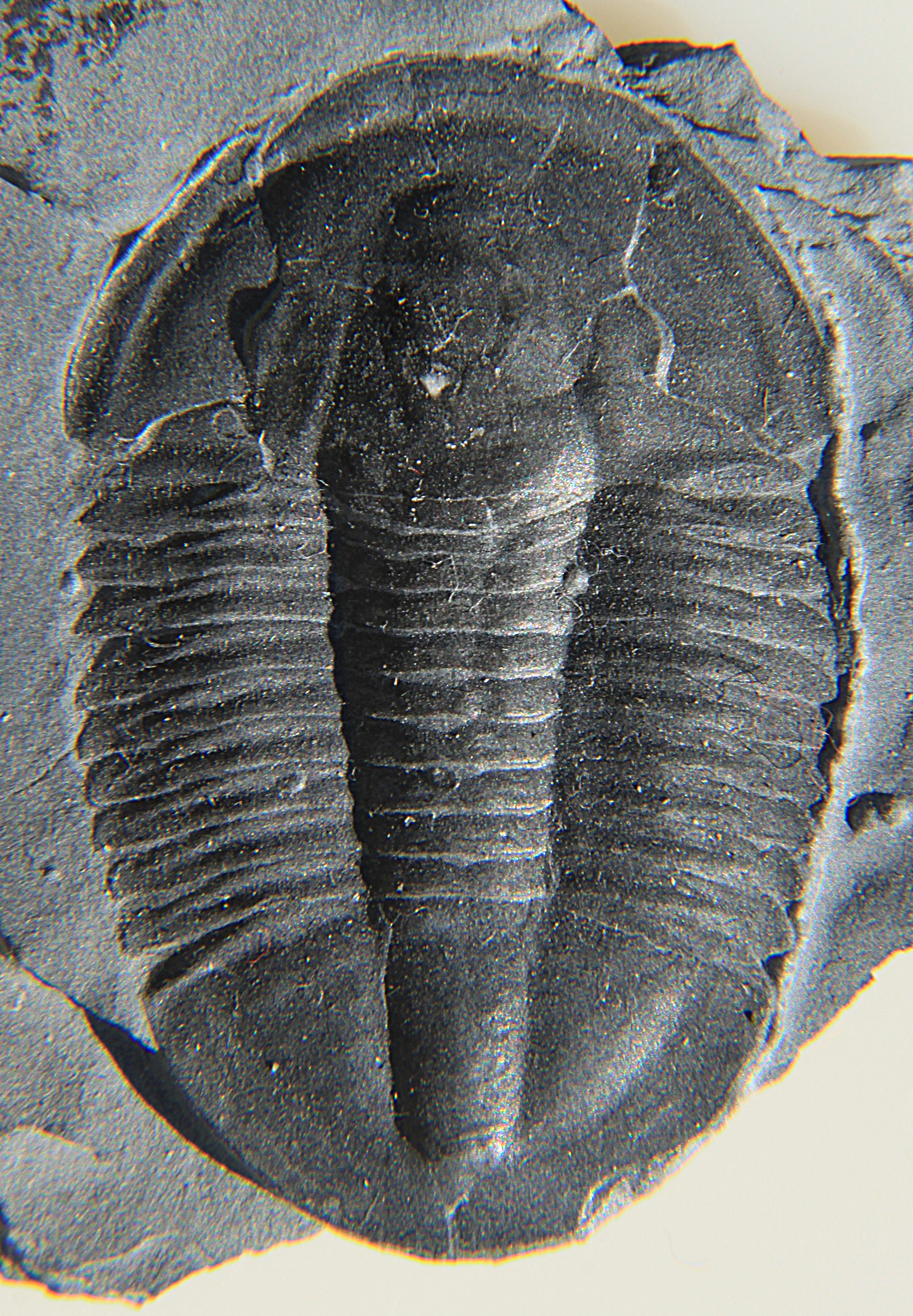
- Fossil of the Cambrian trilobite Asaphiscus
  †Asaphiscus
  - †Asaphiscus wheeleri
- †Ascopora
  - †Ascopora macellata
- †Astartella
  - †Astartella subquadrata
- †Asterophyllites
  - †Asterophyllites charaeformis
  - †Asterophyllites equisetiformis
  - †Asterophyllites longifolius
- †Athabaskia
  - †Athabaskia bithus
  - †Athabaskia wasatchensis
- †Athyridacid
- †Athyris
  - †Athyris lamellosa
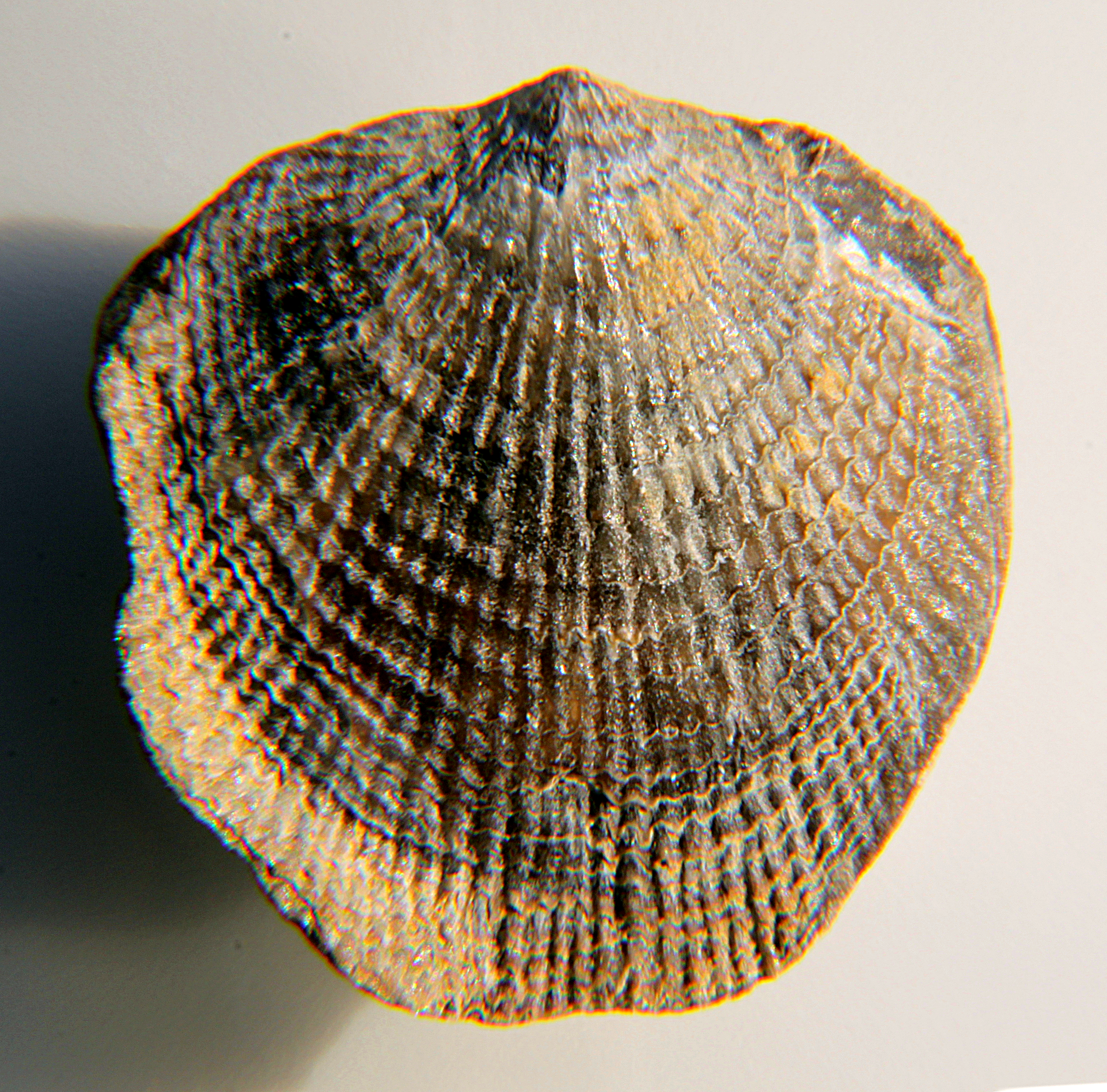
- Fossilized shell of the Late Ordovician-Carboniferous brachiopod Atrypa
  †Atrypa
  - †Atrypa hedei
  - †Atrypa parva – or unidentified comparable form
- †Atrypid
- †Aulacoparia – tentative report
  - †Aulacoparia quadrata
  - †Aulacoparia venta
- †Aulacotheca
  - †Aulacotheca campbellii
  - †Aulacotheca hemingwayi
- †Aulopora – tentative report
- †Aviculopecten
  - †Aviculopecten girtyi
  - †Aviculopecten kaibabensis – or unidentified comparable form
- †Aviculopinna
  - †Aviculopinna peracuta – tentative report
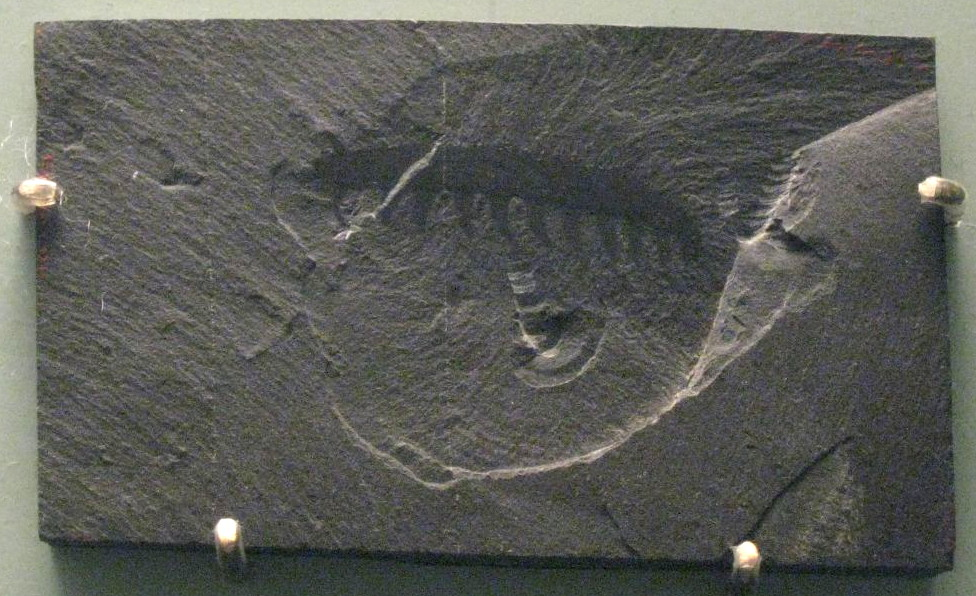
- Fossil of the Cambrian velvet worm relative Aysheaia
  †Aysheaia

== B ==
- †Babylonites
  - †Babylonites conoideus
- †Bakevellia
- †Baltagnostus
  - †Baltagnostus eurypyx
- †Barrandia – tentative report
- †Bathymyonia
  - †Bathymyonia nevadensis
- †Bathyurellus
  - †Bathyurellus feitleri
  - †Bathyurellus pogonipensis
  - †Bathyurellus pogonopensis
  - †Bathyurellus teretus – type locality for species
- †Bathyuriscus
  - †Bathyuriscus brighamensis
  - †Bathyuriscus elegans
  - †Bathyuriscus fimbriatus
  - †Bathyuriscus wasatchensis
- †Bayfieldia
- †Bearriverops
  - †Bearriverops alsacharovi – type locality for species
  - †Bearriverops borderinnensis – type locality for species
  - †Bearriverops deltaensis – type locality for species
  - †Bearriverops ibexensis – type locality for species
  - †Bearriverops loganensis
- †Beckwithia
  - †Beckwithia typa
- †Belemnospongia
  - †Belemnospongia neofascicularis – type locality for species
- †Bellazona
  - †Bellazona bella
  - †Bellazona polita – type locality for species
- †Bellefontia
  - †Bellefontia acuminiferentis
  - †Bellefontia chamberlaini
  - †Bellefontia ibexensis
- †Benthamaspis
  - †Benthamaspis diminutiva
  - †Benthamaspis gibberula – type locality for species
  - †Benthamaspis obrepta
- †Beyrichoceras
- †Bighornia
- †Billingsella
- †Biscoia
- †Blastoidocrinus
  - †Blastoidocrinus carchariaedens – or unidentified comparable form
- †Blountia
- †Bolaspidella
  - †Bolaspidella contracta
  - †Bolaspidella housensis
  - †Bolaspidella type locality for species – informal
  - †Bolaspidella wellsvillensis
- †Bolbocephalus
- †Bollandoceras
  - †Bollandoceras occidentale – type locality for species
- †Bonneterrina
- †Bourbonnella
  - †Bourbonnella jocelynae – type locality for species
- †Bowmania
- †Brachyaspidion
  - †Brachyaspidion microps
  - †Brachyaspidion sulcatum
- †Brachyprion
  - †Brachyprion geniculata
- †Brachythyris
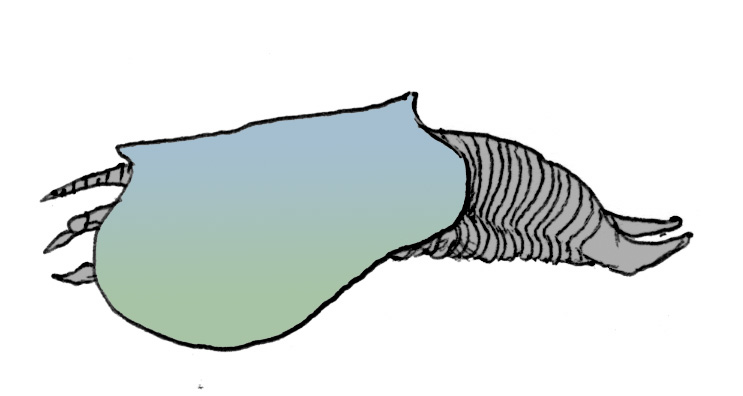
- Life restoration of the mysterious Cambrian animal Branchiocaris
  †Branchiocaris
  - †Branchiocaris pretiosa
- †Brassicicephalus
- †Breckwithia
  - †Breckwithia typa
- †Brodioptera
  - †Brodioptera stricklani – type locality for species
- †Bromella
- †Brooksella
- †Bucania
- †Bythicheilus
  - †Bythicheilus typicum

== C ==
- †Cactocrinus
  - †Cactocrinus arnoldi
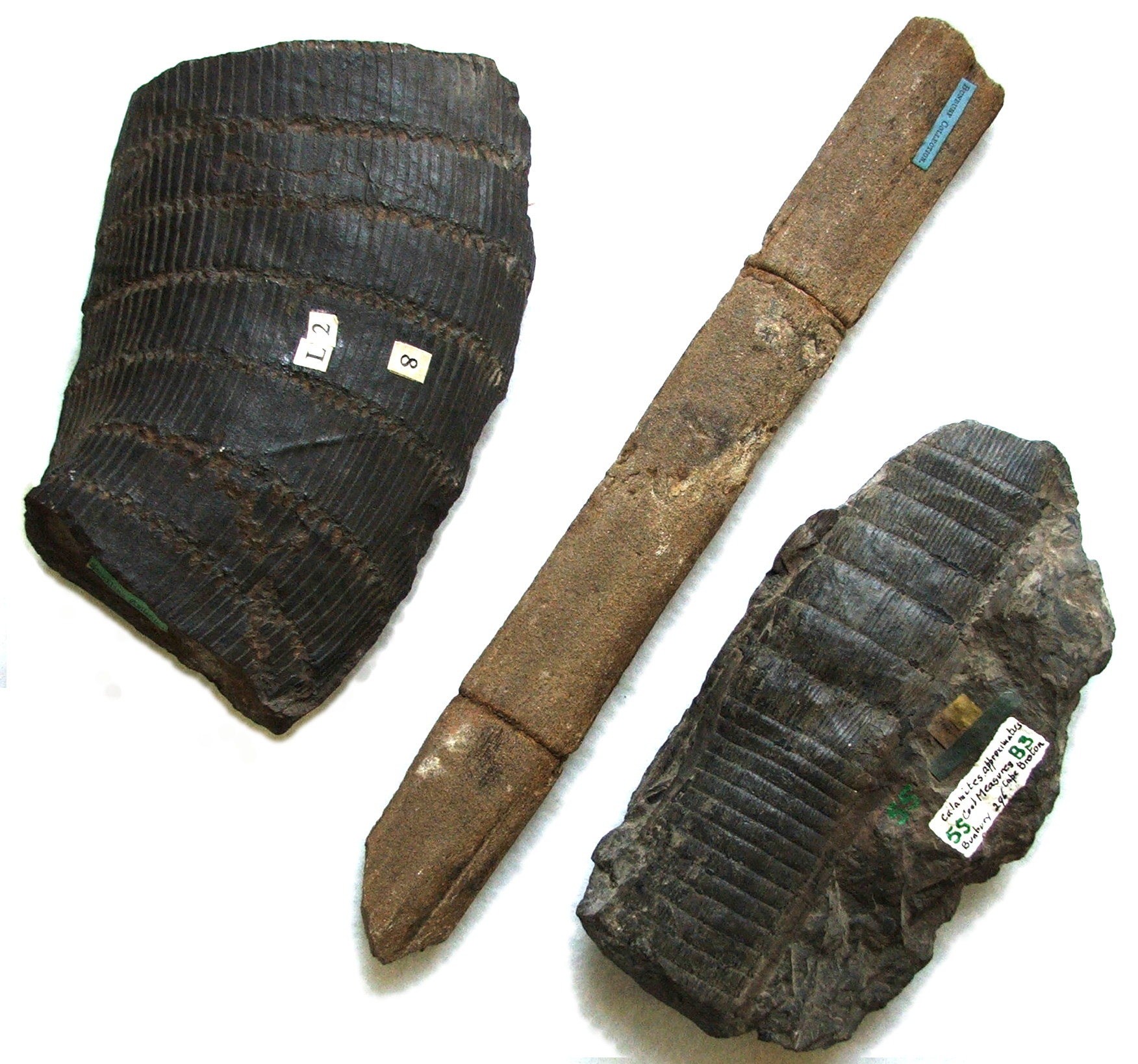
- Fossilized stems from the Carboniferous-Permian horsetail relative Calamites
  †Calamites
  - †Calamites cistii – or unidentified comparable form
  - †Calamites cistiiformis
  - †Calamites gigas
  - †Calamites hesperius
  - †Calamites infractus
  - †Calamites suckowii
- †Calamostachys – tentative report
- †Calathium
  - †Calathium yersini – type locality for species
- †Callipteris – tentative report
- †Callocladia
  - †Callocladia jensensis
- †Calycocoelia
- †Calygirtyoceras
  - †Calygirtyoceras arcticum
  - †Calygirtyoceras confusionense – type locality for species
- †Camarotoechia
- †Cambromedusa – type locality for genus
  - †Cambromedusa furcula – type locality for species
- †Camerella
- †Campbelloceras – tentative report
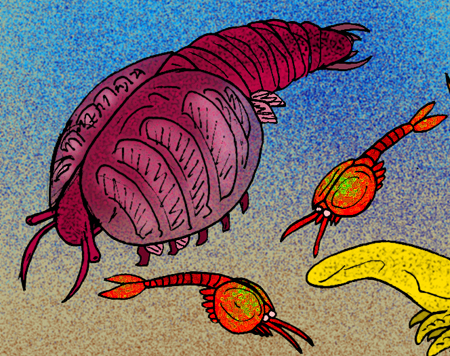
- Life restoration of the Cambrian arthropod Canadaspis (left)
  †Canadaspis
  - †Canadaspis perfecta – or unidentified comparable form
- †Canadia
- †Canadiphyllum
- †Cancrinella
  - †Cancrinella phosphatica – or unidentified comparable form
- †Caninaphyllum
  - †Caninaphyllum incrussatum
- †Caninia
  - †Caninia torquia
- †Caninophyllum
- †Canthylotreta
  - †Canthylotreta marjumensis
- †Cardiomorpha
- †Cardiopteris
  - †Cardiopteris hirta – or unidentified comparable form
- †Carolinites
  - †Carolinites ekphymosus
  - †Carolinites genacinaca – type locality for species
  - †Carolinites killarnyensis
  - †Carolinites killaryensis
- †Castericystis
  - †Castericystis sprinklei – type locality for species
  - †Castericystis vali – type locality for species
- †Catoraphiceras
  - †Catoraphiceras colon
- †Caulpsis
  - †Caulpsis punctata
- †Cavusgnathus
  - †Cavusgnathus regularis
  - †Cavusgnathus unicornis
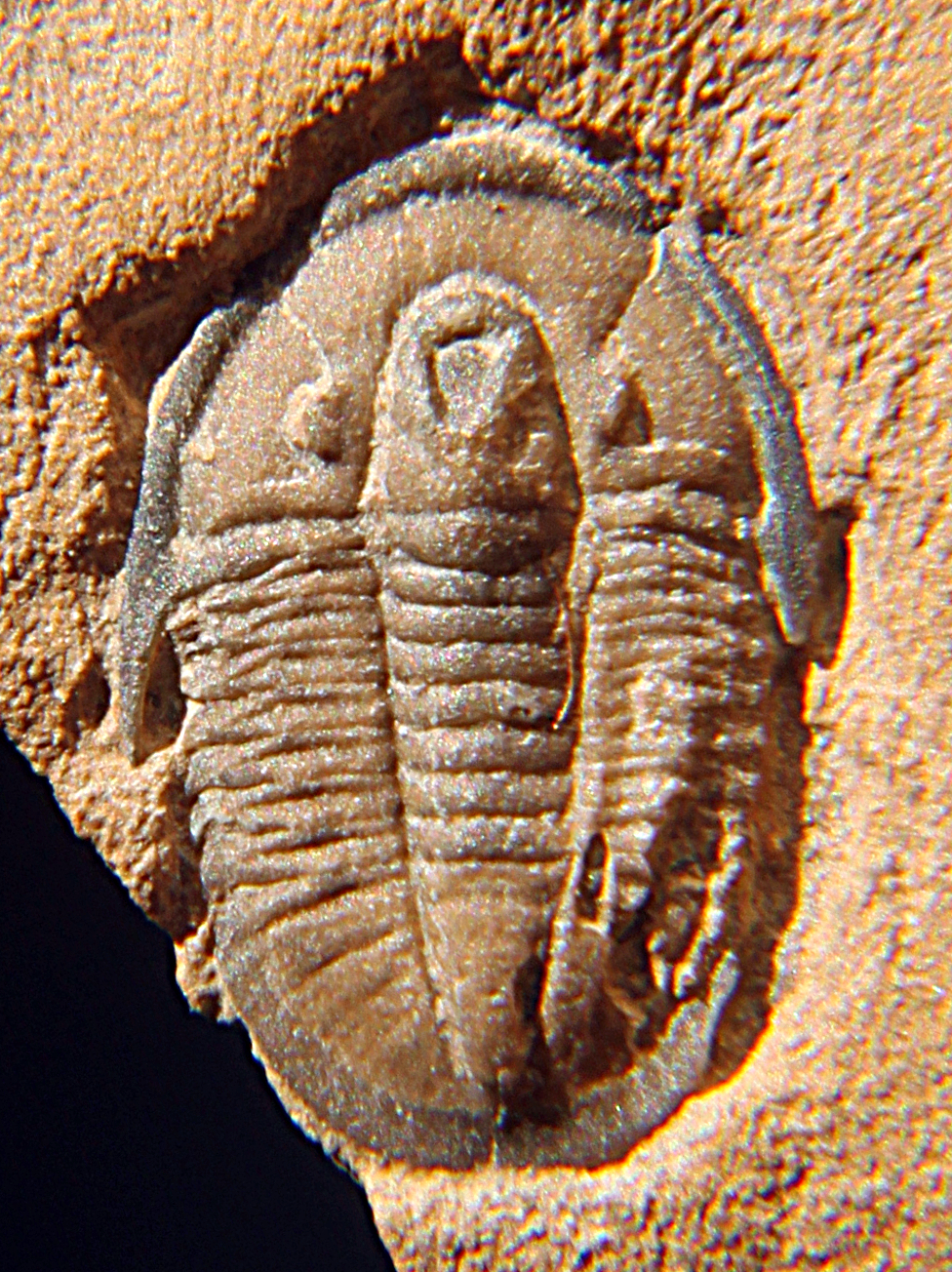
- Fossil of the Cambrian trilobite Cedaria
  †Cedaria
  - †Cedaria minor
- †Cedarina – tentative report
- †Cenorhynchia
  - †Cenorhynchia type locality for species A – informal
- †Cernuolimbus
  - †Cernuolimbus granulosus
- †Chaenomya
- †Chaetetes
  - †Chaetetes milleporaceous
- †Chancelloria
  - †Chancelloria eros
  - †Chancelloria pentacta – type locality for species
- †Chancia)
  - †Chancia ebdome – or unidentified comparable form
- †Chanciaopsis – type locality for genus
  - †Chanciaopsis heteromorphos – type locality for species
- †Chanciopsis
  - †Chanciopsis heteromorphos
- †Cheilocephalus
- †Chilotrypa
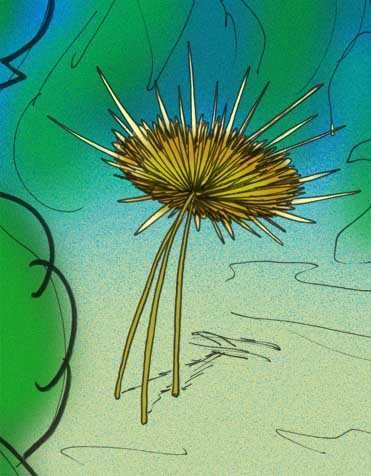
- Life restoration of the Cambrian sponge Choia
  †Choia
  - †Choia carteri
  - †Choia hindei
  - †Choia ridleyi
  - †Choia utahensis
- †Chondrites
- †Chonetes
- †Chonetina
  - †Chonetina flemingi
- †Choristites
  - †Choristites fritschi – or unidentified comparable form
  - †Choristites pavlovi – or unidentified comparable form
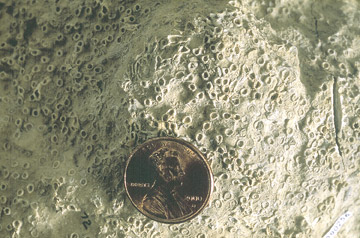
- Fossil of the Carboniferous tabulate coral Cladochonus
  †Cladochonus
- †Clathrospira – tentative report
- †Clavagnostus
  - †Clavagnostus repandus
- †Cleiothyridina
  - †Cleiothyridina type locality for species A – informal
  - †Cleiothyridina type locality for species B – informal
- †Clelandia
  - †Clelandia utahensis
- †Cliothyridina
  - †Cliothyridina orbicularis
- †Clonograptus
- †Coelogasteroceras
- †Coenites
- †Colinispongia
  - †Colinispongia regularis
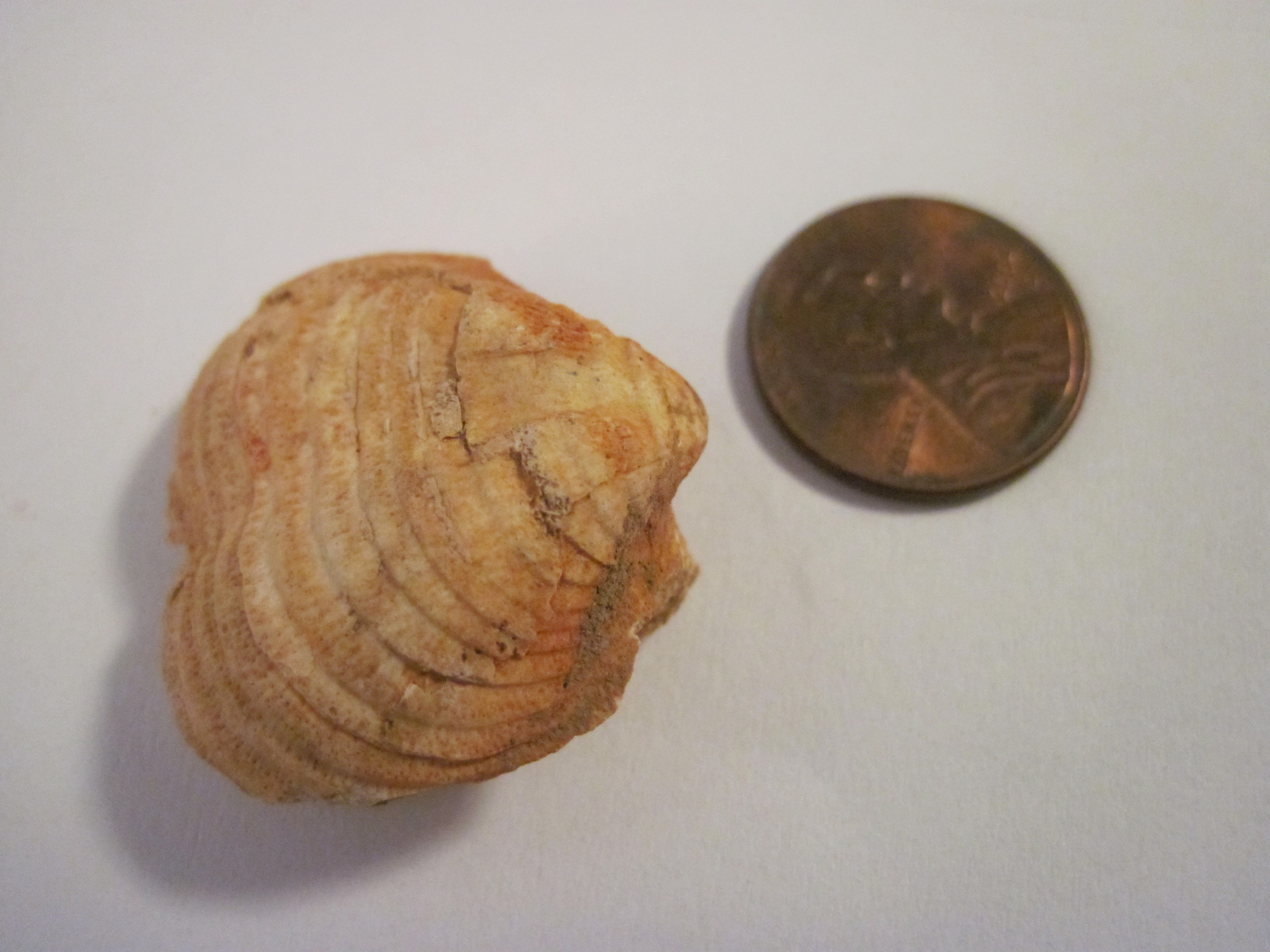
- Fossilized shell of the Late Devonian-Permian brachiopod Composita
  †Composita
  - †Composita argentea
  - †Composita mira
  - †Composita ovata
  - †Composita parasulcata
  - †Composita plana
  - †Composita subtilita
  - †Composita trilobata
  - †Composita trinuclea
- †Condrathyris
  - †Condrathyris perplexa
- †Conotreta
  - †Conotreta millardensis
- †Coosella
- †Coosina
- †Cordaianthus
  - †Cordaianthus pseudofluitans
- †Cordaicarpus
  - †Cordaicarpus binutus – type locality for species
  - †Cordaicarpus cordatus
  - †Cordaicarpus elongatus
  - †Cordaicarpus globosus – type locality for species
  - †Cordaicarpus jayshulerii – type locality for species
  - †Cordaicarpus manningcanensis – type locality for species
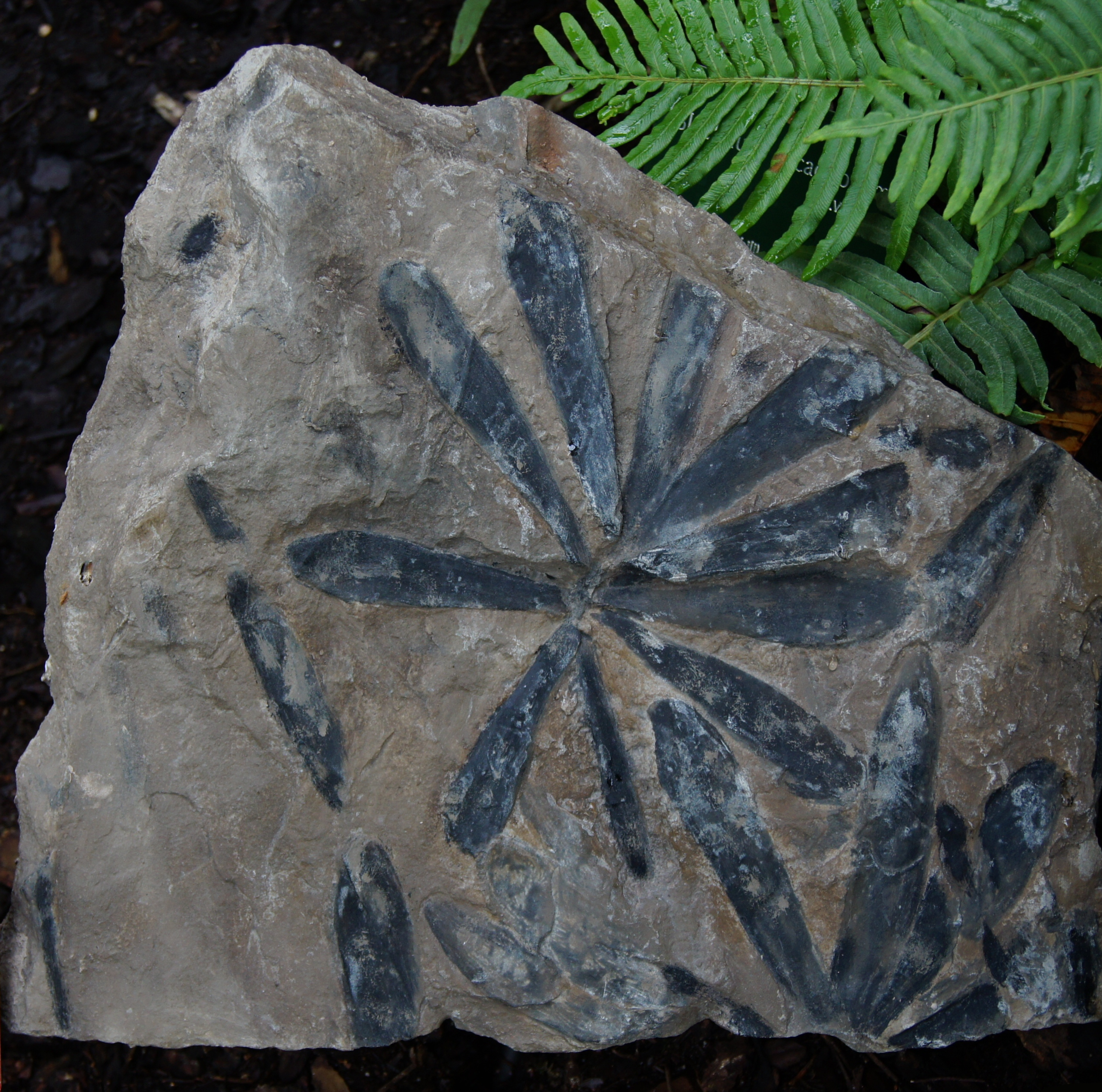
- Fossilized foliage of the Carboniferous-Permian conifer relative Cordaites
  †Cordaites
  - †Cordaites angulosostriatus
  - †Cordaites principalis
  - †Cordaites Sp. A – informal
  - †Cordaites Sp. B – informal
- †Cornucarpus
  - †Cornucarpus longicaudatus – type locality for species
- †Corynepteris
  - †Corynepteris angustissima
- †Costellarina
- †Cotalagnostus
- Crania
  - †Crania rowleyi
- †Cravenoceras
- †Crepicephalus
- †Crossopteris – type locality for genus
  - †Crossopteris mcknightii – type locality for species
  - †Crossopteris undulata – type locality for species
  - †Crossopteris utahensis – type locality for species
- †Crurithyris
  - †Crurithyris arcuatus – or unidentified comparable form
  - †Crurithyris expansa – tentative report
- †Cruziana
- †Ctenalosia
  - †Ctenalosia fixata
- †Ctenocystis
  - †Ctenocystis utahensis
- †Ctenospondylus
  - †Ctenospondylus casei – or unidentified related form
- †Cyathaxonia
- †Cyathocarpus
  - †Cyathocarpus arborescens
  - †Cyathocarpus cyatheus
- †Cybeloides
- †Cybelopsis
  - †Cybelopsis speciosa
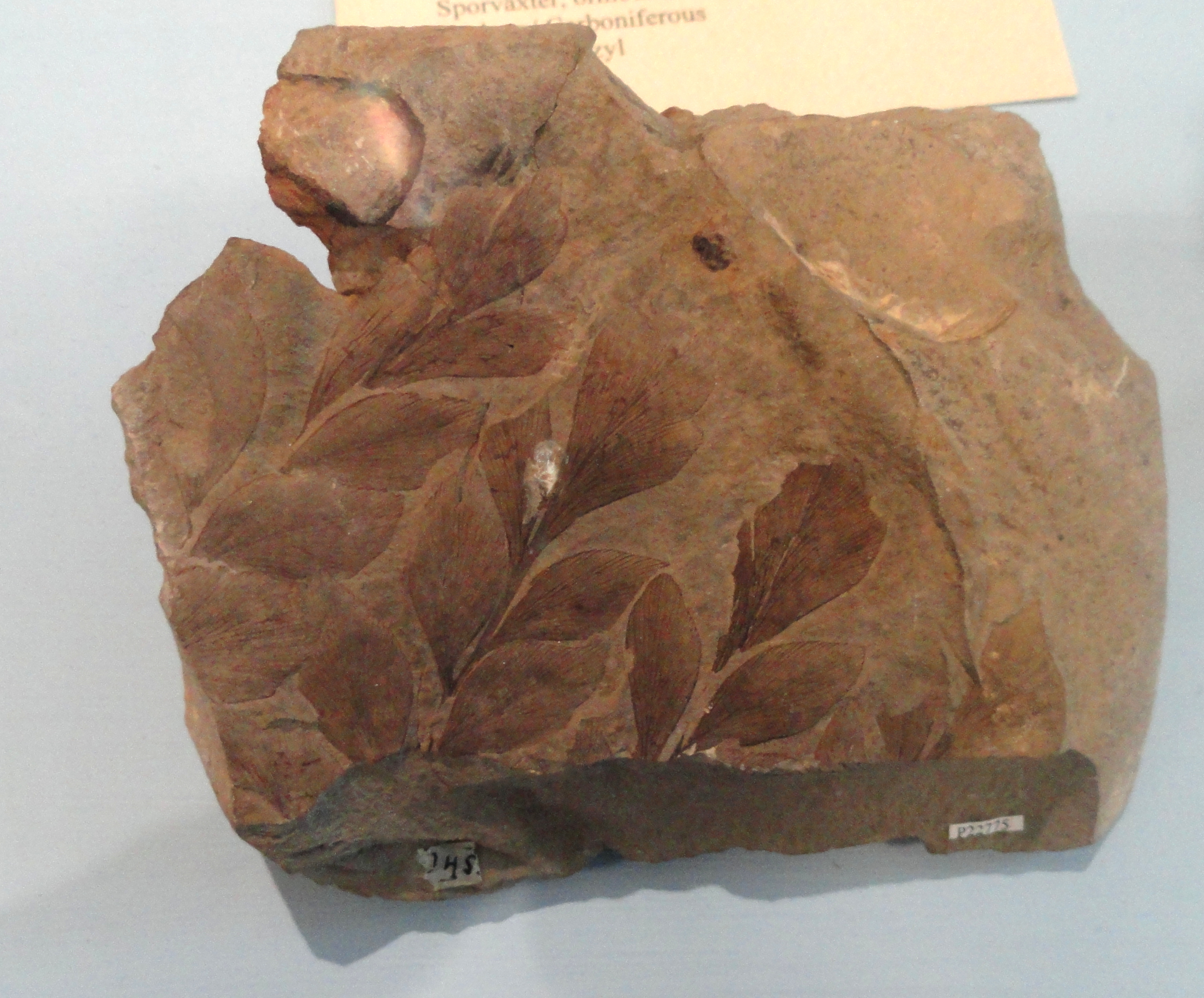
- Fossilized foliage from the Carboniferous seed fern Cyclopteris
  †Cyclopteris
  - †Cyclopteris dilatata
- †Cymatospira
  - †Cymatospira montfortianus
- †Cymbiocrinus
  - †Cymbiocrinus anatonus – type locality for species
  - †Cymbiocrinus cuneatus – type locality for species
- †Cyperites
  - †Cyperites bicarinatus
- †Cyrtia
- †Cyrtina
- †Cyrtorostra
- †Cystodictya
  - †Cystodictya astrepta

== D ==
- †Dalmanellida
- †Deiracephalus
- †Delaria
  - †Delaria sevilloidia
- †Delocrinus
  - †Delocrinus subhemisphericus
- †Deltina – type locality for genus
  - †Deltina limba – type locality for species
- Dentalium
- †Derbyia
  - †Derbyia bennetti
  - †Derbyia crassa
  - †Derbyia sulca
  - †Derbyia wabashensis
- †Desmoinesia
  - †Desmoinesia muricatina
- †Diacanthaspis
  - †Diacanthaspis trispineus – type locality for species
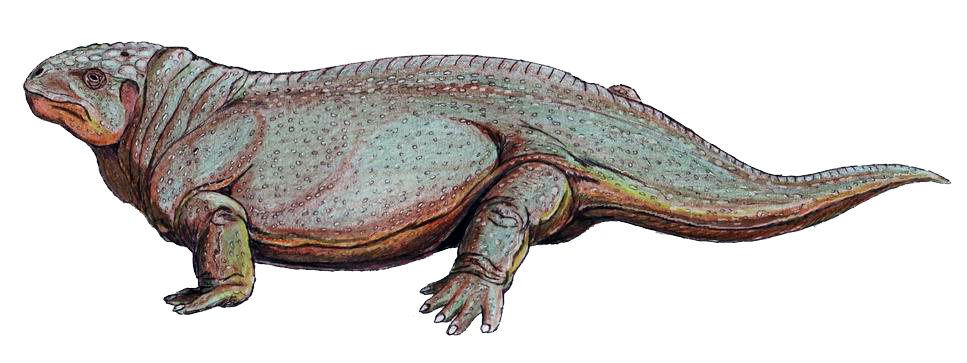
- Life restoration of the Permian reptile relative Diadectes
  †Diadectes
- †Diagoniella
  - †Diagoniella cyathiformis
  - †Diagoniella hindei
  - †Diagoniella magna – type locality for species
  - †Diagoniella robisoni – type locality for species
- †Diaphragmus
  - †Diaphragmus cestriensis
- †Dicanthopyge
  - †Dicanthopyge convergens
- †Dicranocaris
  - †Dicranocaris guntherorum
- †Dictyoclostus
  - †Dictyoclostus burlingtonensis
  - †Dictyoclostus inflatus
- †Dictyonema
  - †Dictyonema flabelliforme – or unidentified comparable form
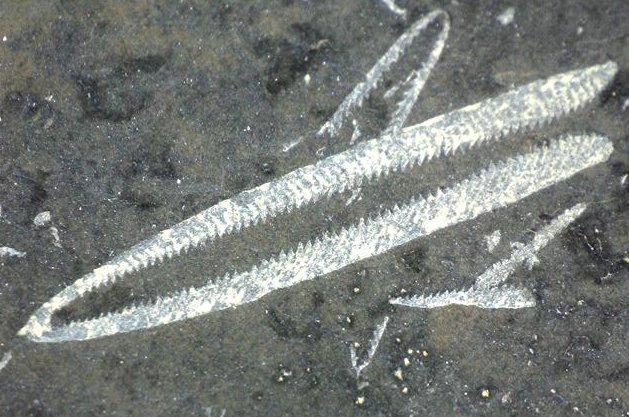
- Fossil of the Middle Ordovician graptolite Didymograptus
  †Didymograptus
  - †Didymograptus artus
  - †Didymograptus bifidus
  - †Didymograptus nitidus – or unidentified comparable form
- †Dielasma
  - †Dielasma formosum
  - †Dielasma phosphoriense
  - †Dielasma spatulatum
- †Dimegelasma
- †Dimeropygiella
  - †Dimeropygiella blanda
  - †Dimeropygiella caudanodosa – type locality for species
  - †Dimeropygiella fillmorensis
  - †Dimeropygiella mccormicki
  - †Dimeropygiella ovata
- †Dimorphoceras
  - †Dimorphoceras rileyi – type locality for species
  - †Dimorphoceras worki – type locality for species
- †Dioxycaris
  - †Dioxycaris argenta
- †Diparalasma
- †Diparelasma
  - †Diparelasma pogonipensis – or unidentified comparable form
  - †Diparelasma rowelli
  - †Diparelasma transversum – or unidentified comparable form
- †Diphyphyllum
- †Diplagnostus
  - †Diplagnostus planicauda
- †Diplorrhina
  - †Diplorrhina depressa
- †Diplothmema
  - †Diplothmema arnoldi
  - †Diplothmema obtusiloba
  - †Diplothmema trifoliolata
- †Diplotrypa – tentative report
- †Ditomopyge
- †Dolerorthis – tentative report
  - †Dolerorthis flabellites
- †Donaldina
- †Dorypyge
  - †Dorypyge swasii
  - †Dorypyge wellsvillensis
- †Drepanodus
  - †Drepanodus homocurvatus
- †Dresbachia
  - †Dresbachia amata
- †Duartea
  - †Duartea bruntoni
- †Dunbarinella – tentative report
- †Dunderbergia
  - †Dunderbergia anyta
  - †Dunderbergia bigranulosa – tentative report
- †Dyoros
  - †Dyoros type locality for species A – informal
- †Dysoristus
- †Dytremacephalus
- †Dzhaprakoceras

== E ==
- †Echinalosia
  - †Echinalosia type locality for species A – informal
- †Echinaria
  - †Echinaria semipunctata – or unidentified related form
- †Echinauris – or unidentified comparable form
  - †Echinauris subhorrida
- †Echinoconchus
  - †Echinoconchus elegans
  - †Echinoconchus semipunctatus
- †Echinocrinus
- †Ectenonotus
  - †Ectenonotus progenitor
  - †Ectenonotus whittingtoni
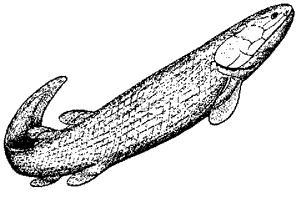
- Life restoration of the Permian lobe-finned fish Ectosteorhachis
  †Ectosteorhachis – or unidentified related form
  - †Ectosteorhachis nitidus
- †Edmondia
- †Ehmaniella
  - †Ehmaniella quadrans – tentative report
- †Ekvasophyllum
  - †Ekvasophyllum inclinatum
- †Elburgia
  - †Elburgia granulosa
  - †Elburgia intermedia
- †Eldonia
  - †Eldonia ludwigi
- †Eleutherocentrus
  - †Eleutherocentrus petersoni
- †Elrathella
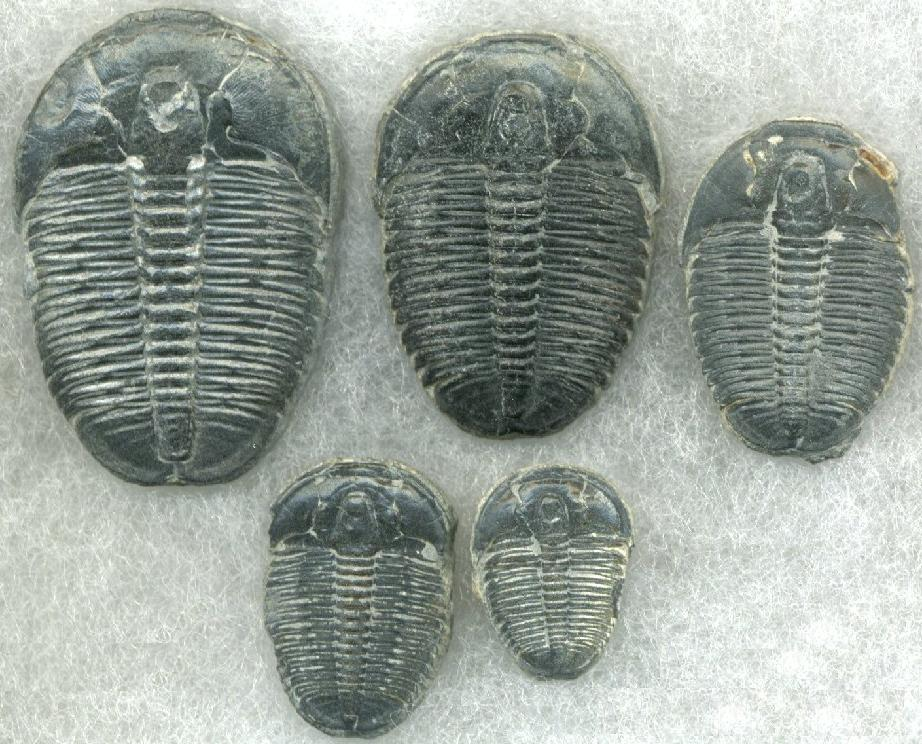
- Fossils at different stages of development of the Cambrian trilobite Elrathia
  †Elrathia
  - †Elrathia kingi
- †Elrathiella
  - †Elrathiella dugwayensa – type locality for species
- †Elrathina
  - †Elrathina spencei
- †Elvinia
- †Emeraldella
- †Endelocrinus
  - †Endelocrinus matheri
- †Endoceras
- †Entogonites
  - †Entogonites acus
  - †Entogonites borealis
  - †Entogonites burbankensis – type locality for species
- †Eoastarte
  - †Eoastarte subcircularis
- †Eofletcheria
- †Eoorthis
- †Eriaster – type locality for genus
  - †Eriaster ibexensis – type locality for species
- †Eridopora
- †Eridotrypa
  - †Eridotrypa hindsi
  - †Eridotrypa subtilis
- †Erixanium
  - †Erixanium carinatum
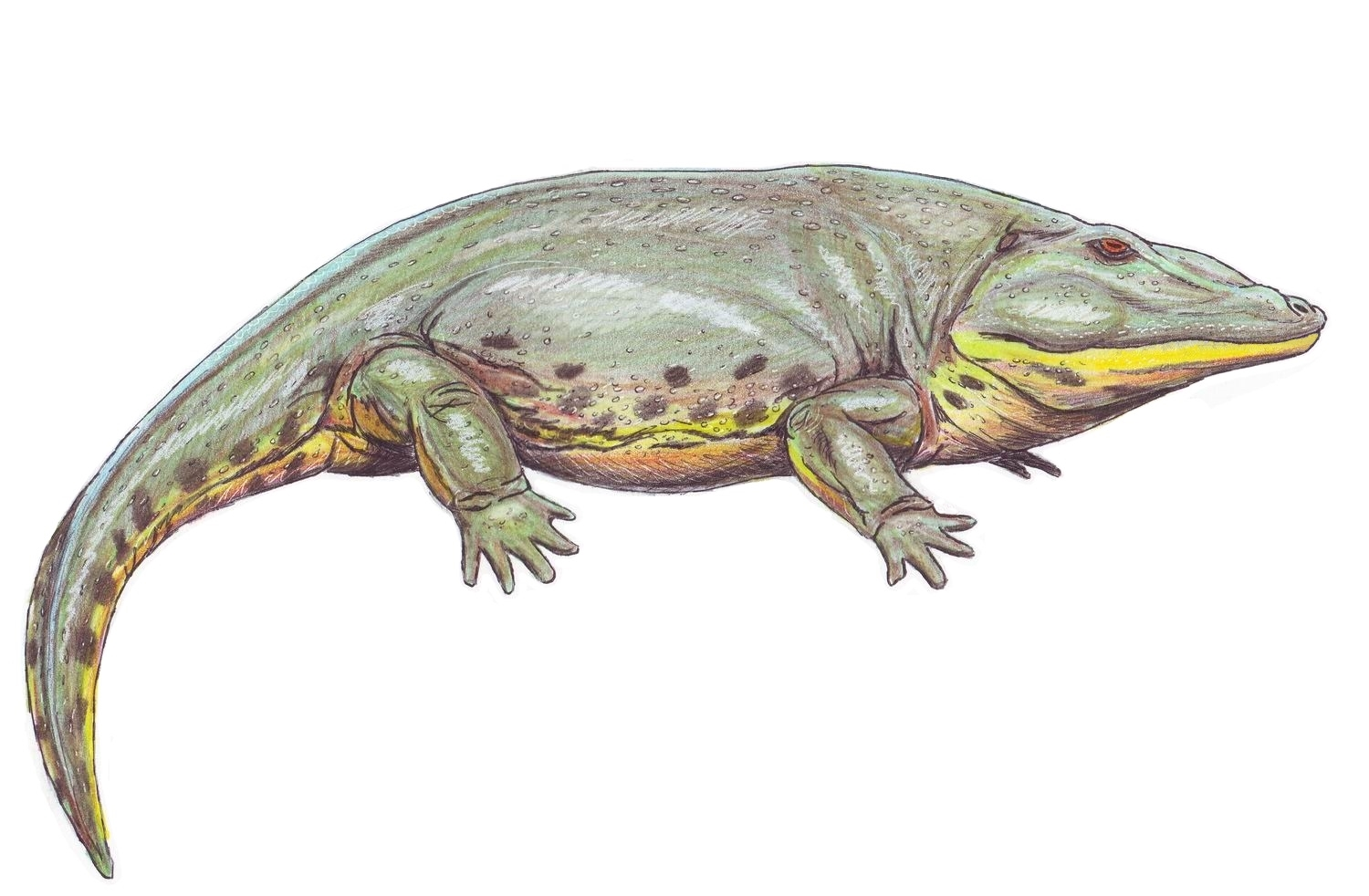
- Life restoration of the Carboniferous-Permian amphibian Eryops
  †Eryops
- †Euconospira
- †Eukrinaster – type locality for genus
  - †Eukrinaster ibexensis – type locality for species
- †Eukteanochiton – type locality for genus
  - †Eukteanochiton milleri – type locality for species
- †Euloma – report made of unidentified related form or using admittedly obsolete nomenclature
  - †Euloma cordilleri
- †Eumetria
  - †Eumetria acuticosta
  - †Eumetria costata
- †Euphemites
  - †Euphemites carbonarius
- †Euphemitopsis
  - †Euphemitopsis subpapillosa – type locality for species
- †Euptychaspis
- †Eurekia
- †Eurytreta
  - †Eurytreta bisecta – or unidentified comparable form
  - †Eurytreta fillmorensis – type locality for species

== F ==
- †Faberophyllum
- †Falcatamacaris – type locality for genus
  - †Falcatamacaris bellua – type locality for species
- †Fenestella
  - †Fenestella acarinata
  - †Fenestella crockfordae
  - †Fenestella dissepinodaria
  - †Fenestella hamithensis
  - †Fenestella incipiens
  - †Fenestella parallela
  - †Fenestella rarinodosa
  - †Fenestella regalis
  - †Fenestella serratula
  - †Fenestella tooelensis
  - †Fenestella trifurcata
  - †Fenestella utahensis
- †Fenestralia
  - †Fenestralia sanctiludovici
- †Fenestrellina
- †Fistulipora
- †Forteyops
  - †Forteyops sexapugia – type locality for species
- †Fusulinella

== G ==
- †Gattendorfia
- †Genalaticurus
  - †Genalaticurus genalatus
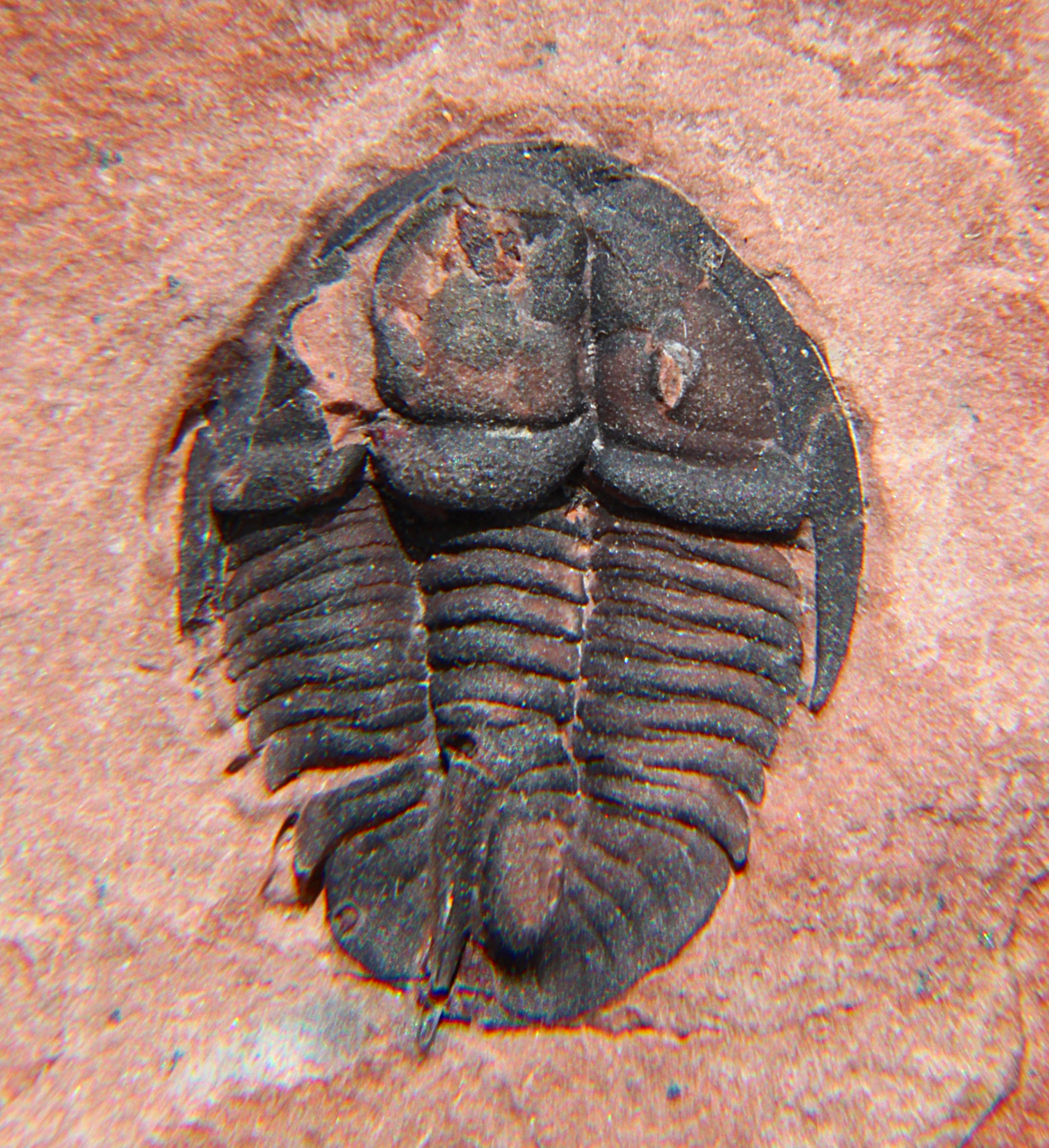
- Fossil of the Cambrian trilobite Genevievella
  †Genevievella
  - †Genevievella granulatus
- †Girtyella – tentative report
- †Girtyoceras
  - †Girtyoceras gordoni – type locality for species
  - †Girtyoceras hamiltonense
  - †Girtyoceras primum – type locality for species
- †Girtypecten
- †Girtyspira
- †Girvanella
- †Glabrocingulum
  - †Glabrocingulum coronatum
  - †Glabrocingulum granulosum – type locality for species
  - †Glabrocingulum mephitifontis – type locality for species
- †Glaphyrites
  - †Glaphyrites nevadensis
- †Globocrinus
  - †Globocrinus bulbus – type locality for species
- †Glochinomorpha – type locality for genus
  - †Glochinomorpha stifeli – type locality for species
- †Glosopleura
- †Glossopleura
  - †Glossopleura boccar
  - †Glossopleura gigantea
  - †Glossopleura producta
  - †Glossopleura prona
  - †Glossopleura punctatum
- †Glyphaspis
  - †Glyphaspis concavus – type locality for species
- †Glyptospira
- †Gnathodus
  - †Gnathodus texanus
- †Gnetopsis
  - †Gnetopsis anglica
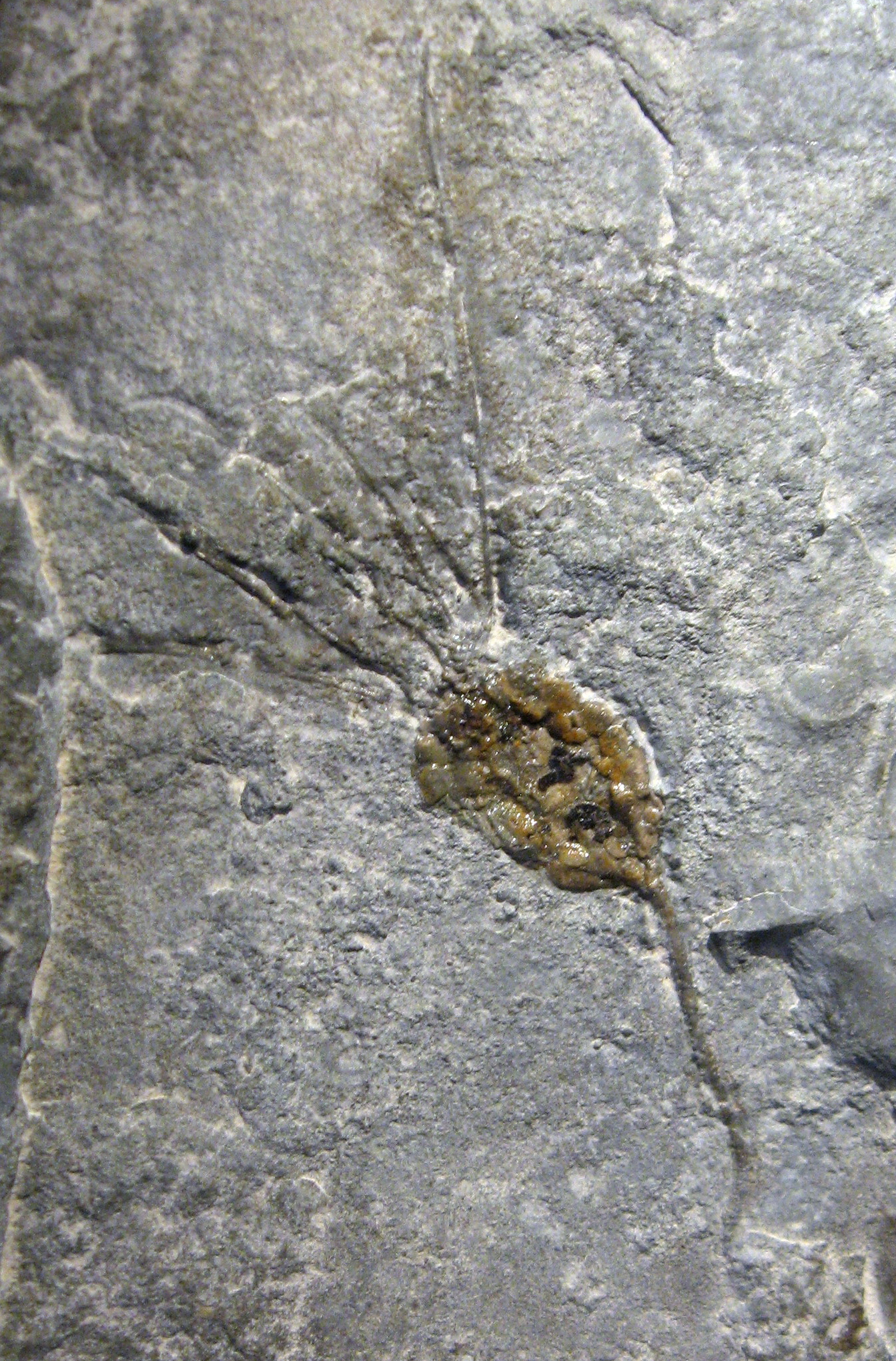
- Fossil of the Cambrian echinoderm Gogia
  †Gogia
  - †Gogia granulosa
  - †Gogia guntheri
  - †Gogia kitchnerensis
  - †Gogia spiralis
- †Goleocrinus
  - †Goleocrinus vadosus – type locality for species
  - †Goleocrinus vedosus
- †Goniasma
- †Goniatites
  - †Goniatites americanus
  - †Goniatites deceptus – type locality for species
  - †Goniatites eganensis
  - †Goniatites sowerbyi
- †Goniophrys
  - †Goniophrys prima
- †Goniotelena
  - †Goniotelena ensifer
- †Goniotelina
  - †Goniotelina ensifer
  - †Goniotelina plicolabeonus – type locality for species
- †Goniotelus – tentative report
  - †Goniotelus ludificatus
- †Gonitelina
- †Gothodus
  - †Gothodus communis
- †Grammatodon
  - †Grammatodon politus
- †Grandaurispina – or unidentified comparable form
  - †Grandaurispina type locality for species A – informal
- †Gruntia – tentative report
- †Guizhoupecten – tentative report
  - †Guizhoupecten tubicostata – or unidentified comparable form
- †Gujocardita
  - †Gujocardita parviradiatus – type locality for species
- †Gunterichthys – type locality for genus
  - †Gunterichthys lehiensis – type locality for species

== H ==
- †Haimacystis
  - †Haimacystis rozhnovi
- †Hammatocyclus
  - †Hammatocyclus brazerensis – type locality for species
- †Hamptonia
  - †Hamptonia bowerbanki
  - †Hamptonia parva – type locality for species
- †Haplistion
  - †Haplistion sphaericum
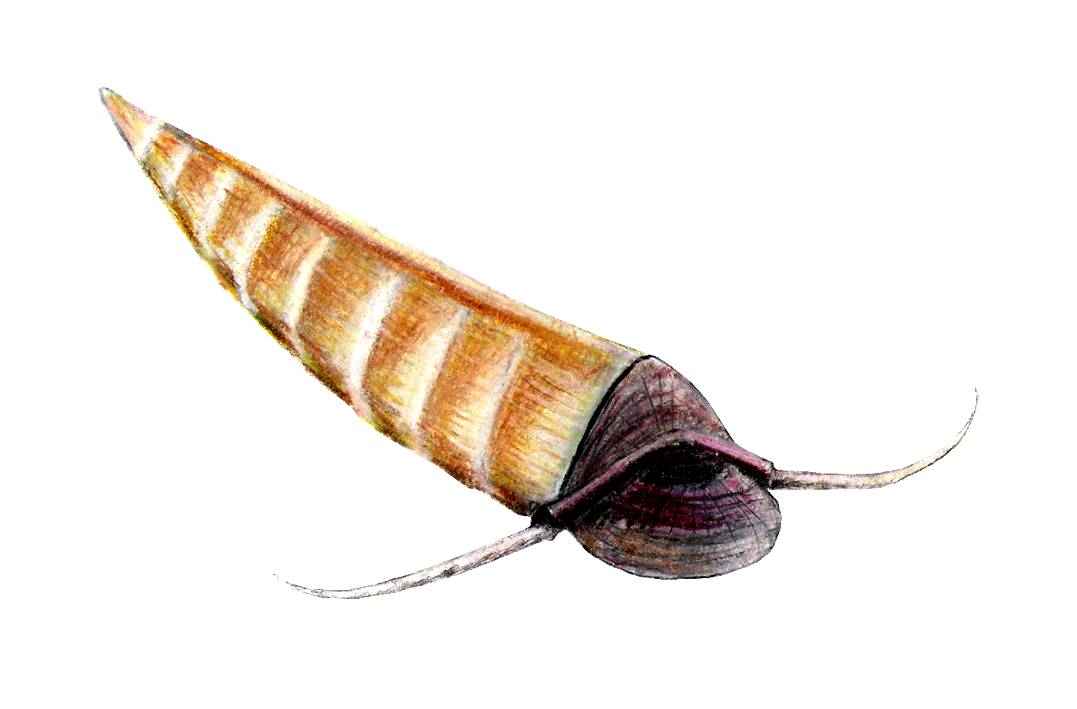
- Life restoration of the Cambrian brachiopod relative Haplophrentis
  †Haplophrentis
  - †Haplophrentis carinatus
  - †Haplophrentis reesei
- †Hardyoides
- †Hazelia
  - †Hazelia palmata
- †Heckethornia
  - †Heckethornia alticapitis – type locality for species
  - †Heckethornia ballionae – type locality for species
  - †Heckethornia bowiei – type locality for species
  - †Heckethornia hyndeae
  - †Heckethornia morrisseyi – type locality for species
  - †Heckethornia numani
  - †Heckethornia smithi – type locality for species
- †Heintzella
  - †Heintzella whitneyi
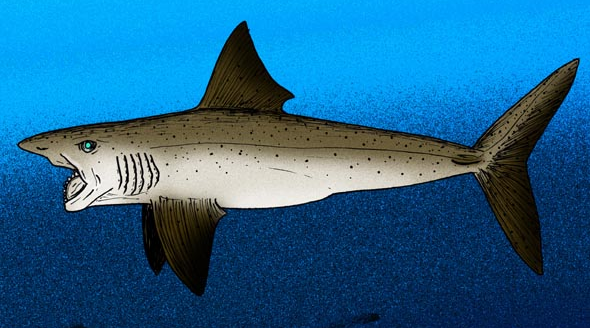
- Life restoration of the Permian Chimaera relative Helicoprion
  †Helicoprion
- †Helicospira
- †Hematites
  - †Hematites barbarae – type locality for species
  - †Hematites burbankensis – type locality for species
- †Hemiptychina
  - †Hemiptychina quadricostata
- †Hemirhodon
  - †Hemirhodon amplipyge
- †Hemitrypa
  - †Hemitrypa reticulata
- †Hesperonomia
  - †Hesperonomia dinorthoides
  - †Hesperonomia fontinalis
  - †Hesperonomia frontinalis
- †Hesperonomiella
  - †Hesperonomiella minor
- †Heteralosia
- †Heteropecten
  - †Heteropecten vanvleeti – or unidentified comparable form
- †Hillyardina
  - †Hillyardina marginauctum
  - †Hillyardina semicylindrica – or unidentified comparable form
- †Hindia
  - †Hindia sphaeroidalus
- †Hintzecurus
  - †Hintzecurus paragenalatus
- †Hintzeia
  - †Hintzeia aemula
  - †Hintzeia celsaora
  - †Hintzeia firmimarginis
- †Hintzespongia – type locality for genus
  - †Hintzespongia bilamina – type locality for species
- †Holcospermum
- †Homagnostus
- †Homalophyllites
- †Hormotoma – tentative report
- †Housia
- †Howellella
- †Hudsonospongia – tentative report
- †Huronia
  - †Huronia vertebralis
- †Hustedia
  - †Hustedia elongata
  - †Hustedia mormoni – type locality for species
- †Hyattidina – tentative report
- †Hyolithellus

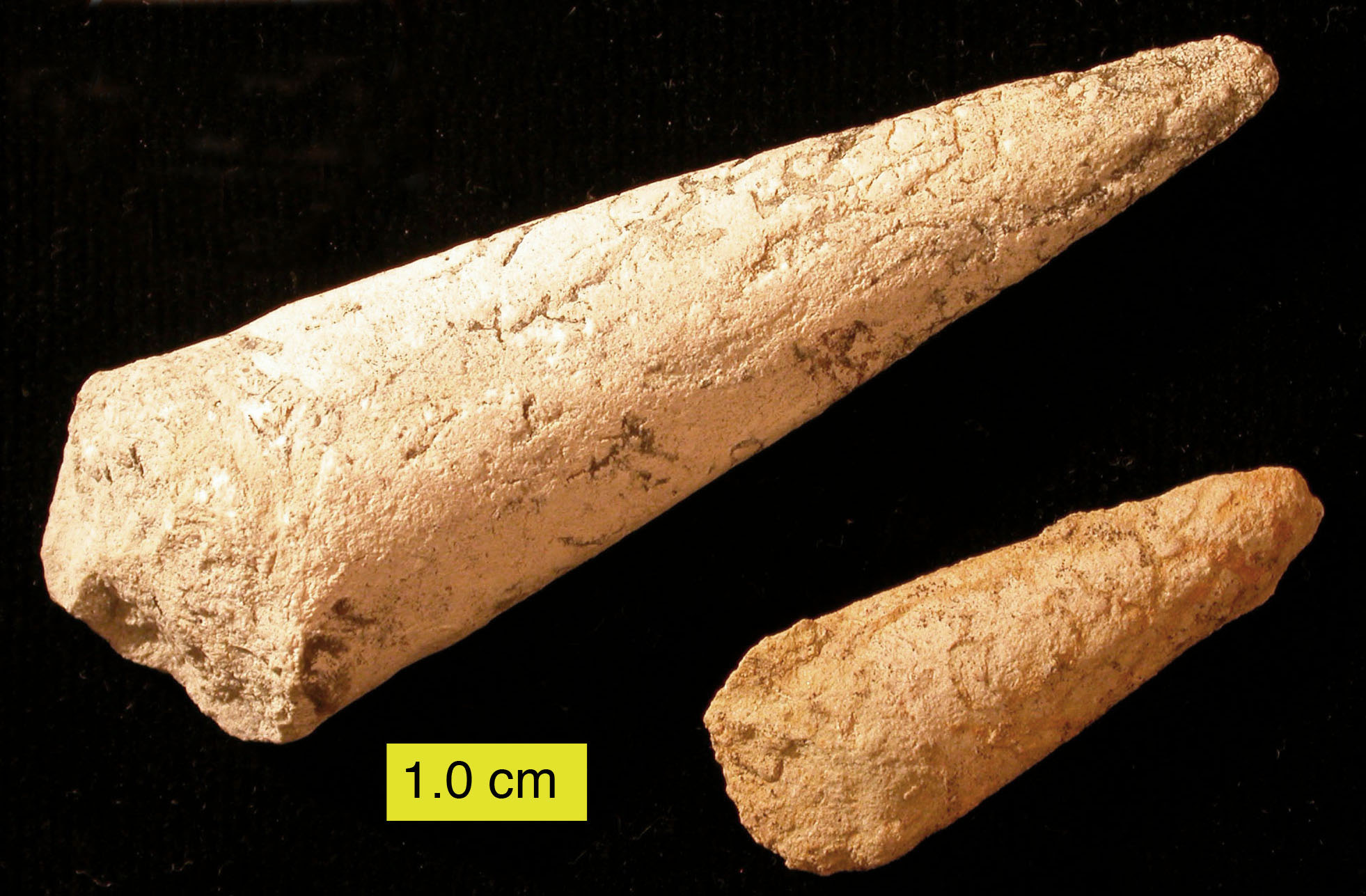
Fossilized shells of the Cambrian-Permian brachiopod relative Hyolitha

†Hyolithes

  - †Hyolithes comptus
- †Hypagnostus
  - †Hypagnostus parvifrons
- Hyperammina
- †Hyperbolochilus
- †Hypselocrinus
  - †Hypselocrinus cavus – type locality for species
  - †Hypselocrinus defendus – type locality for species
  - †Hypselocrinus secundus
  - †Hypselocrinus superus – type locality for species
- †Hystriculina
  - †Hystriculina fragilis
  - †Hystriculina wabashensis
- †Hystricurus
  - †Hystricurus contractus
  - †Hystricurus oculilunatus
  - †Hystricurus robusta

== I ==
- †Ianthinopsis
- †Ibexella
  - †Ibexella multidiaphragmata
- †Ibexicurus
  - †Ibexicurus parsonsi – type locality for species
- †Iddingsia
- †Idiognathodus
- †Idiomesus
- †Illaenurus
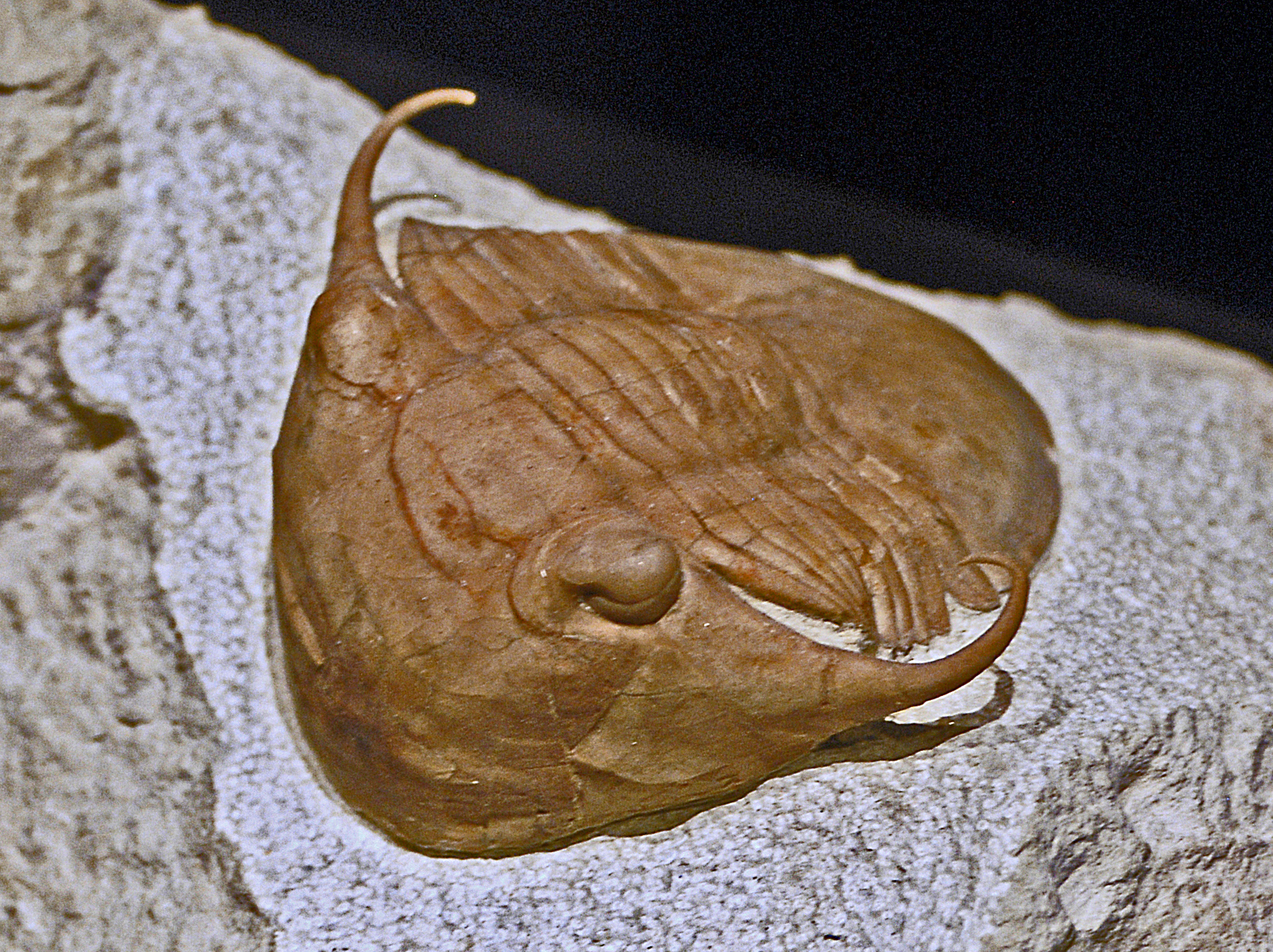
- Fossil of the Middle Ordovician trilobite Illaenus
  †Illaenus
  - †Illaenus utahensis
- †Inflatia
  - †Inflatia bilobata
- †Iphidella
- †Irvingella
  - †Irvingella flohri – tentative report
  - †Irvingella major
- †Ischyrotoma
  - †Ischyrotoma juabensis
  - †Ischyrotoma wahwahensis
- †Isorthis
- †Isoteloides
  - †Isoteloides flexus
  - †Isoteloides polaris
- †Isoxyes

== J ==
- †Jeffersonia
- †Jenkinsonia
  - †Jenkinsonia varga
- †Juresania
  - †Juresania nebraskensis

== K ==
- †Kainella
- †Kanoshia
  - †Kanoshia depressus – type locality for species
  - †Kanoshia kanoshensis
  - †Kanoshia reticulata
- †Kanoshopora
  - †Kanoshopora droserae
- †Kawina
  - †Kawina webbi
  - †Kawina wilsoni
- †Kazakhoceras
  - †Kazakhoceras bylundi – type locality for species
- †Kindbladia
  - †Kindbladia affinis
- †Kingstonia
- †Kirkella
  - †Kirkella fillmorensis
- †Kiwetinokia
  - †Kiwetinokia utahensis
- †Kochina
  - †Kochina vestita
- †Kochiproductus
- †Komia
- †Komiella
  - †Komiella ostiolata
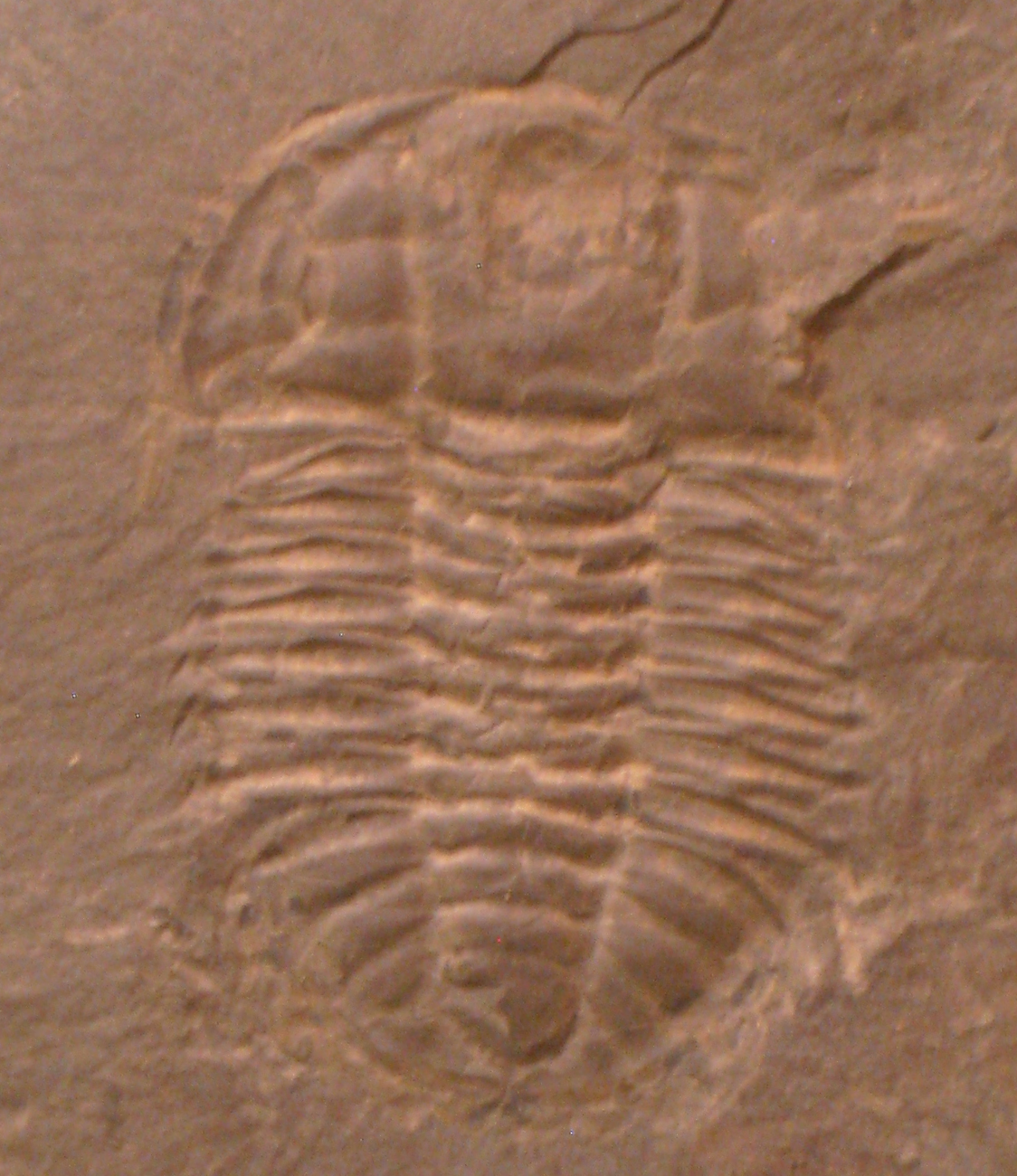
- Fossil of the Cambrian trilobite Kootenia
  †Kootenia
  - †Kootenia acicularis
  - †Kootenia mendosa
  - †Kootenia quadriceps
  - †Kootenia spencei
- †Kootina
  - †Kootina pectenoides
- †Kormagnostella
  - †Kormagnostella advena
  - †Kormagnostella insolita
- †Kormagnostus
- †Kozlowskia
  - †Kozlowskia capaci – or unidentified related form
- †Kutorginella
  - †Kutorginella lasallensis
- †Kuvelousia
  - †Kuvelousia leptosa

== L ==
- †Lachnostoma
  - †Lachnostoma latucelsum – type locality for species
- †Lagenospermum
  - †Lagenospermum discissium – type locality for species
- †Lamellispira
- †Lavadamia
  - †Lavadamia joplinae – type locality for species
- †Leanchoila
  - †Leanchoila protogonia
  - †Leanchoila superlata
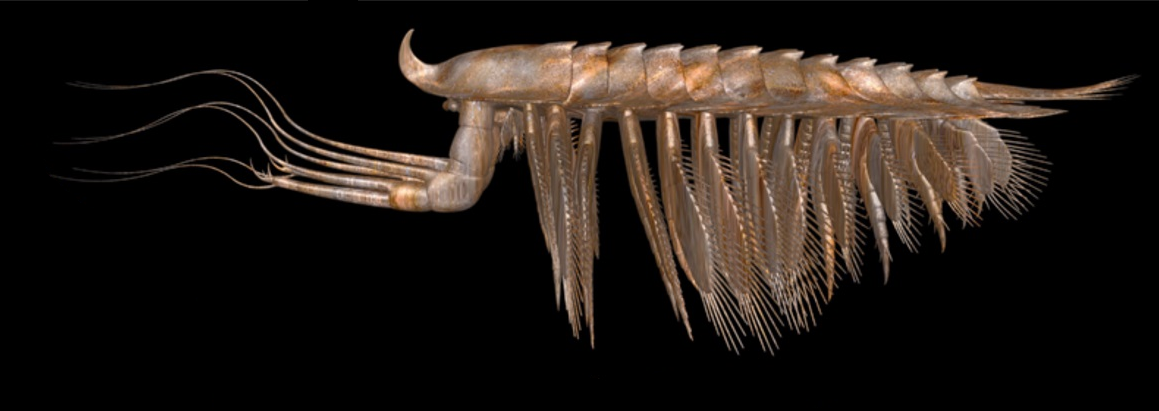
- Life restoration in multiple views of the Cambrian arthropod Leanchoilia
  †Leanchoilia
  - †Leanchoilia hanceyi
  - †Leanchoilia superlata
- †Lecanospira
- †Leiorhynchoidea
- †Leiorhynchus
- †Leiostegium
  - †Leiostegium formosa
  - †Leiostegium manitouense – or unidentified comparable form
  - †Leiostegium manitouensis
- †Lejopyge
  - †Lejopyge calva
- †Leperditia
  - †Leperditia bivia
- †Lepidocarpon
  - †Lepidocarpon linearifolium
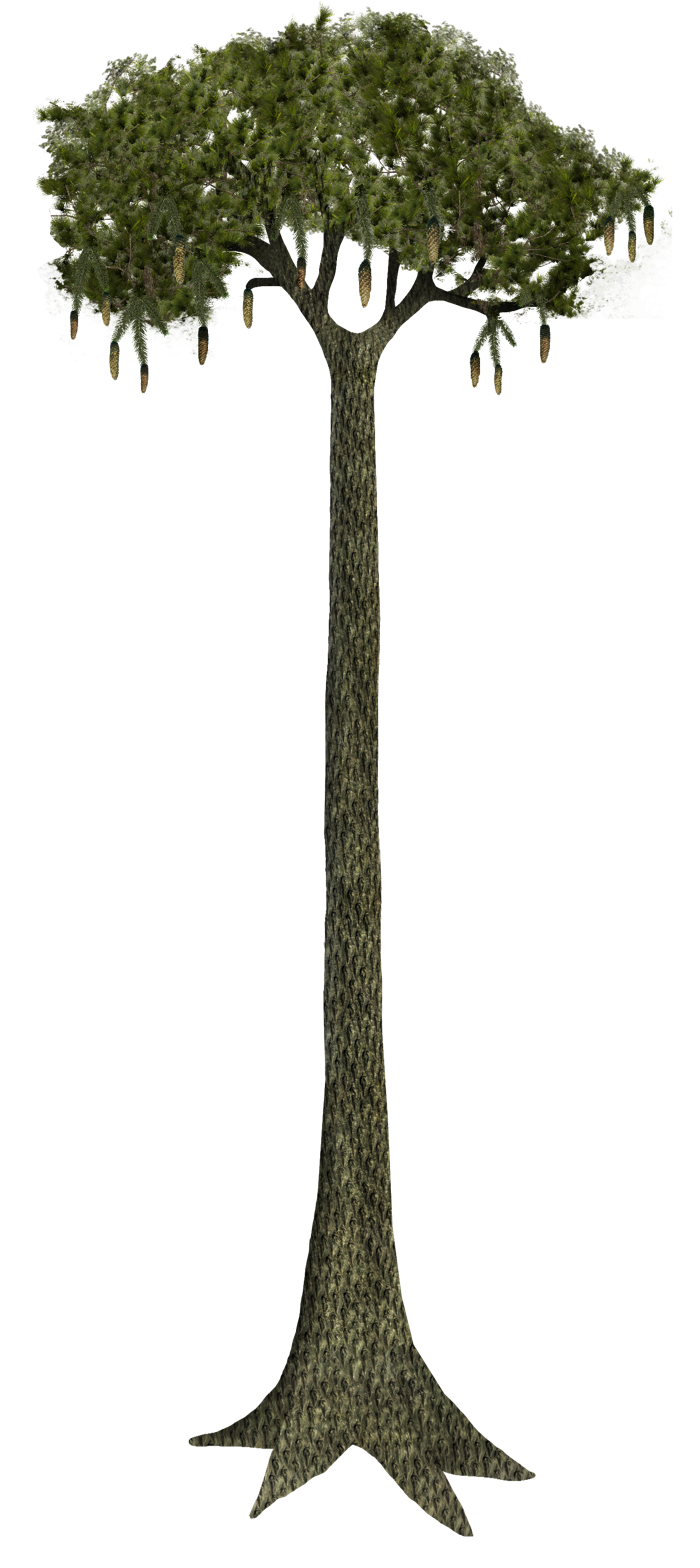
- Life restoration of the Carboniferous tree-sized club moss relative Lepidodendron
  †Lepidodendron
  - †Lepidodendron aculeatum
  - †Lepidodendron obovatum
  - †Lepidodendron volkmannianum
- †Lepidophylloides
- †Lepidophyllum
  - †Lepidophyllum longifolium
- †Lepidostrobophyllum
  - †Lepidostrobophyllum majus
- †Lepidostrobus
  - †Lepidostrobus obovatus
  - †Lepidostrobus variabilis
- †Leptaena
- †Leptalosia
  - †Leptalosia scintilla – or unidentified comparable form
- †Leptanena
- †Leptomitella
  - †Leptomitella metta – type locality for species
- †Leptomitus
- †Lesuerilla – tentative report
- †Licnocephala
  - †Licnocephala bicornuta – tentative report
  - †Licnocephala cavigladius
- Lima
- †Limapecten
- Limatula
- †Limipecten
- †Linevitus
  - †Linevitus billingsi
- Lingula
  - †Lingula carbonaria
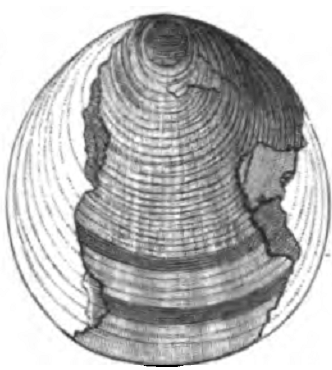
- Illustration of a fossilized shell of the Cambrian-Late Ordovician brachiopod Lingulella
  †Lingulella
  - †Lingulella incurvata
  - †Lingulella pogonipensis – or unidentified comparable form
- †Linipalus
  - †Linipalus magnispinus
- †Linnarssonella
- †Linnarssonia
  - †Linnarssonia bellatula
  - †Linnarssonia ophirensis
- †Linoproductus
  - †Linoproductus meniscus
  - †Linoproductus ovatus
  - †Linoproductus planiventralis – tentative report
  - †Linoproductus prattenians
  - †Linoproductus prattenianus
- †Lissocoelia
  - †Lissocoelia cylindrica
- †Lithostrontionella
- †Lithostrotionella
  - †Lithostrotionella americana – or unidentified comparable form
- †Llanoaspis
- †Lobatospongia – type locality for genus
  - †Lobatospongia nodensis – type locality for species
- †Lochriea
  - †Lochriea commutata
- †Lonchocephalus
- †Lophophyllidium
  - †Lophophyllidium profundum
- †Loxonema
- †Loxoplocus
- †Lunulazona
  - †Lunulazona costata
  - †Lunulazona nodomarginata
- †Lyracystis
  - †Lyracystis reesei

== M ==
- †Macluritella
- †Maclurites
- †Macronotella
- †Madaraspis
  - †Madaraspis magnifica
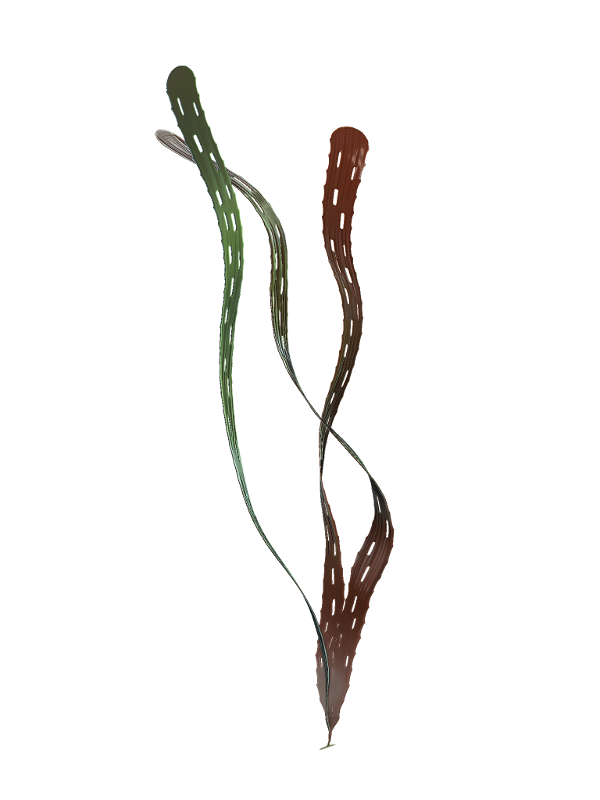
- Restoration of the mysterious Cambrian life-form Margaretia
  †Margaretia
  - †Margaretia dorus
- †Marginifera
- †Marginovatia
  - †Marginovatia catinulus
- †Mariopteris
  - †Mariopteris muricata
- †Marjumicystis
  - †Marjumicystis mettae – type locality for species
- †Marpolia
- †Matherella
- †Matthevia
  - †Matthevia variabilis
  - †Matthevia wahwahensis – type locality for species
- †Meekopora
- †Meekospira
- †Menomonia
  - †Menomonia semele
- †Menoparia
  - †Menoparia genalunata
- †Metabowmania
  - †Metabowmania braggi – type locality for species
  - †Metabowmania morgani
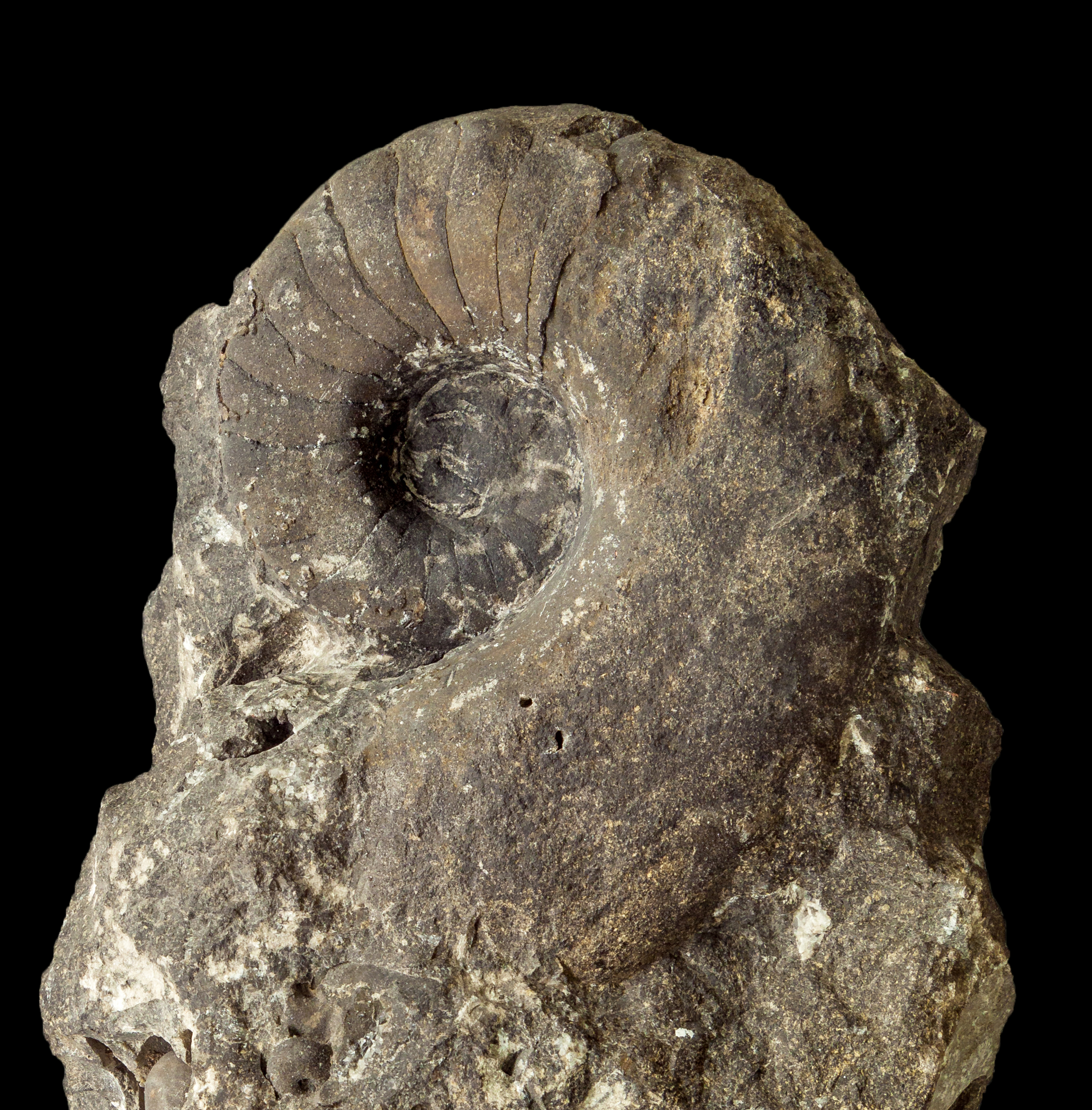
- Fossilized shell of the Carboniferous-Permian nautiloid cephalopod Metacoceras
  †Metacoceras
- †Metadimorphoceras
  - †Metadimorphoceras mangeri – type locality for species
  - †Metadimorphoceras richardsi
- †Meteoaspis – tentative report
- †Meteoraspis
- †Michelinia
- †Microcardinalia
- †Micromitra
  - †Micromitra pannula
- †Millardicurus
  - †Millardicurus housensis – type locality for species
  - †Millardicurus millardensis
  - †Millardicurus paramillardensis – type locality for species
- †Modiolopsis
- Modiolus – report made of unidentified related form or using admittedly obsolete nomenclature
- †Modocia
  - †Modocia brevispina
  - †Modocia laevinucha
  - †Modocia typicalis
  - †Modocia weeksensis – type locality for species
- †Mollisonia
  - †Mollisonia symmetrica
- †Morania
  - †Morania fragmenta
- †Mourlonia
  - †Mourlonia venusta – type locality for species
- †Myalina

== N ==
- †Nanorthis
  - †Nanorthis hamburgensis
  - †Nanorthis multicostata
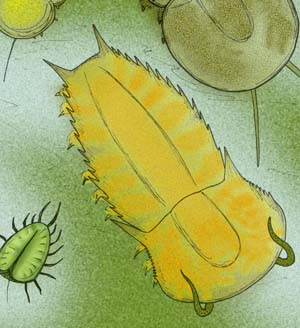
- Restoration of the Cambrian-Silurian arthropod Naraoia
  †Naraoia
  - †Naraoia compacta
- †Narynella
  - †Narynella sulcata
- †Naticopis
  - †Naticopis altonensis – tentative report
- †Naticopsis
- †Natiria
- †Neochonetes
  - †Neochonetes granulifer
- †Neolenus
  - †Neolenus inflatus – type locality for species
  - †Neolenus intermedius – type locality for species
  - †Neolenus superbus
- †Neoprioniodus
  - †Neoprioniodus scitulus
  - †Neoprioniodus varians
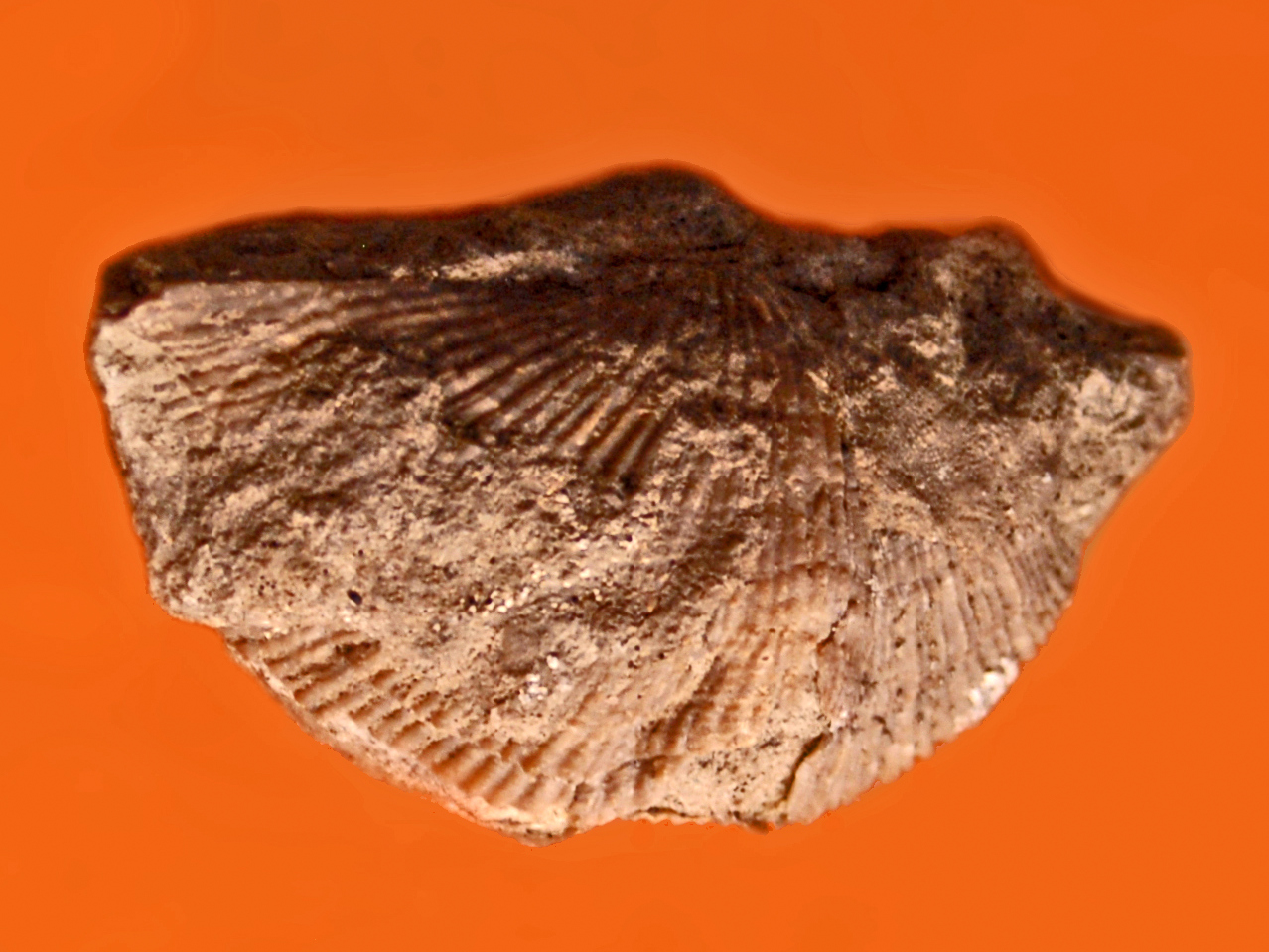
- Fossilized shell of the Carboniferous-Permian brachiopod Neospirifer
  †Neospirifer
  - †Neospirifer cameratus
  - †Neospirifer kansasensis
  - †Neospirifer triplicatus
- †Neozaphrentis – tentative report
- †Nephalicephalus – type locality for genus
  - †Nephalicephalus beebei – type locality for species
- †Nettapezoura
  - †Nettapezoura basilika
- †Neuralethopteris
  - †Neuralethopteris pocahontas – or unidentified comparable form
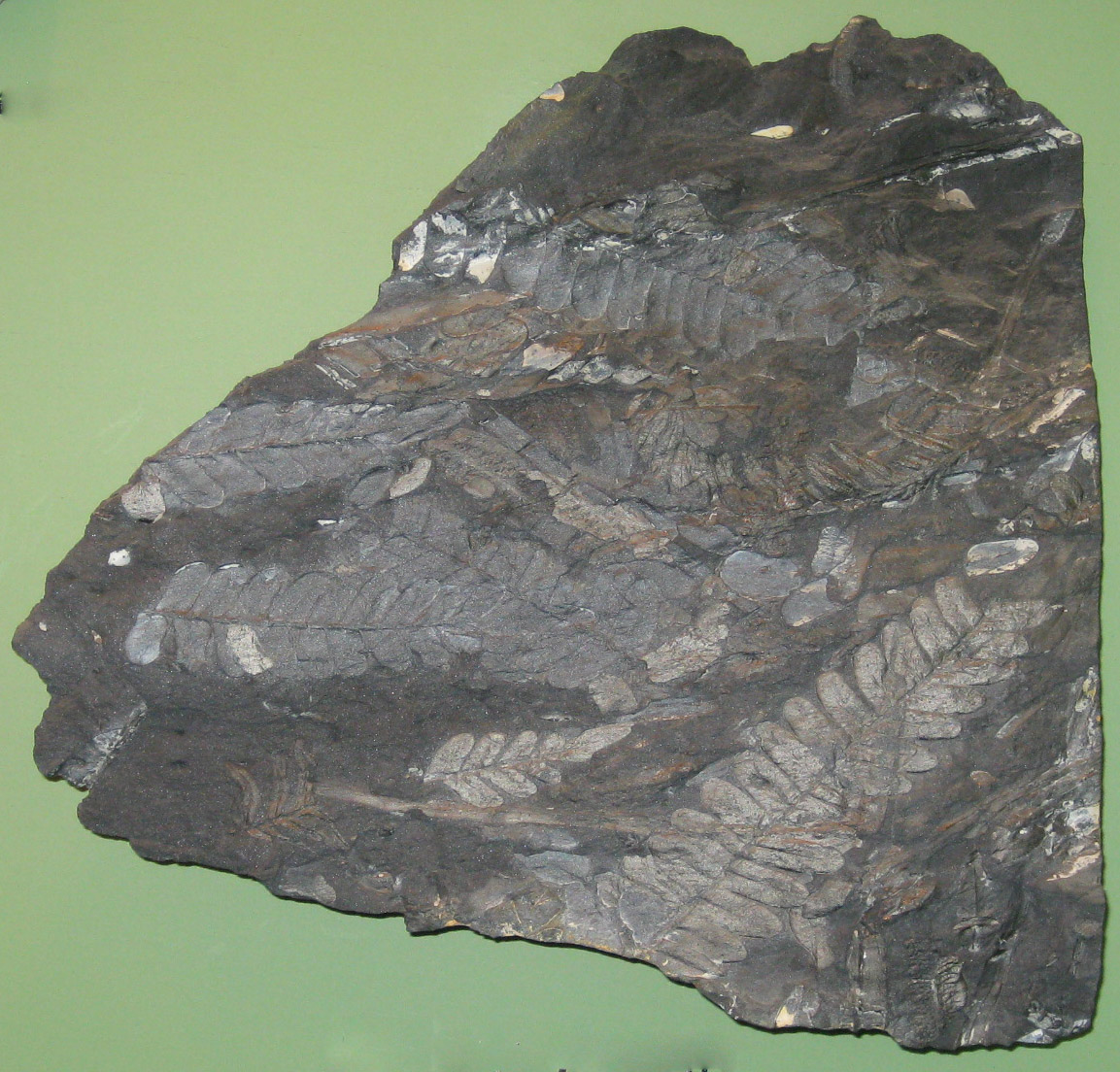
- Fronds of the Carboniferous seed fern Neuropteris
  †Neuropteris
  - †Neuropteris ampelina – type locality for species
  - †Neuropteris gigantea
  - †Neuropteris heterophylla
- †Nieszkowskia – tentative report
- †Niobe – tentative report
- †Nisusia
- †Norwoodia
  - †Norwoodia bellaspina
- †Nothorthis
- †Nuculavus
- †Nuculopsis
- †Nuia
- †Nunnacrinus
  - †Nunnacrinus olsoni – type locality for species

== O ==
- †Obolus
  - †Obolus ella
- †Odontopteris
  - †Odontopteris osmundaeformis – or unidentified comparable form
  - †Odontopteris subcrenulata – or unidentified comparable form
- †Odontospirifer
  - †Odontospirifer type locality for species A – informal
- †Oepikodus
  - †Oepikodus quadratus
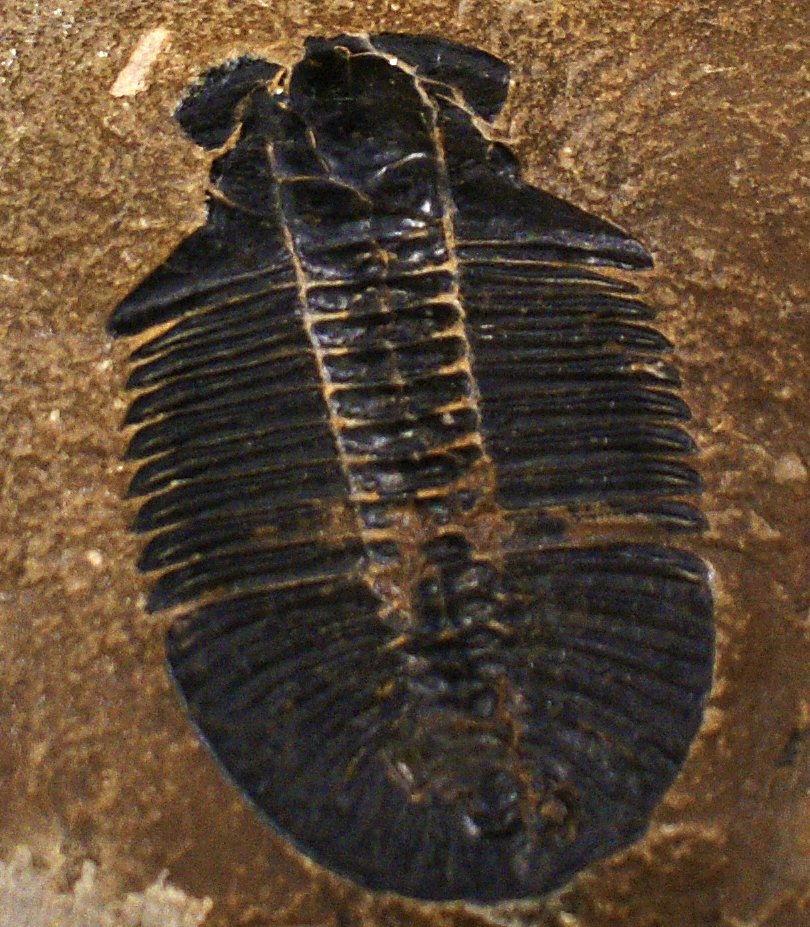
- Fossil of the Cambrian trilobite Ogygopsis
  †Ogygopsis
  - †Ogygopsis typicalis
- †Oistodus
  - †Oistodus lanceolatus
  - †Oistodus linguatus
  - †Oistodus longiramis
  - †Oistodus multicorrugatus – or unidentified related form
  - †Oistodus parallelus
- †Olenellus
  - †Olenellus gilberti
- †Olenoides
  - †Olenoides expansus
  - †Olenoides nevadensis
  - †Olenoides serratus
  - †Olenoides spencei
  - †Olenoides tricephalus
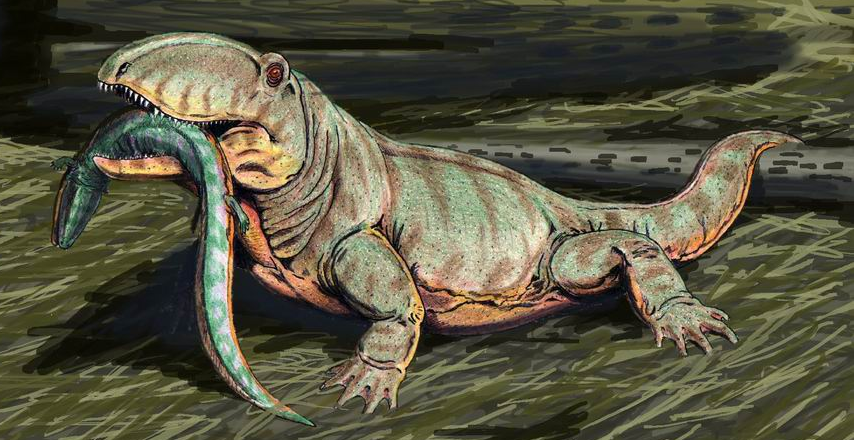
- Life restoration of the Carboniferous-Permian synapsid (mammal precursor) Ophiacodon
  †Ophiacodon
  - †Ophiacodon navajovicus
- †Ophileta
- †Opsioryctocephalus
  - †Opsioryctocephalus opsis
- †Orbiculoidea
  - †Orbiculoidea capuliformis
  - †Orbiculoidea missouriensis
  - †Orbiculoidea utahensis – type locality for species
- †Orbipora
  - †Orbipora utahensis
- †Orthambonites
  - †Orthambonites eucharis – or unidentified comparable form
  - †Orthambonites michaelis
  - †Orthambonites subulata
- †Orthis
  - †Orthis subalata – or unidentified comparable form
  - †Orthis subulata
  - †Orthis swanensis
- †Orthonema
  - †Orthonema socorroense – or unidentified comparable form
- †Orthotetes
  - †Orthotetes kaskaskiensis
- †Orthriochiton – type locality for genus
  - †Orthriochiton utahensis – type locality for species
- †Oryctocare
  - †Oryctocare geikei
- †Oryctocephalus
  - †Oryctocephalus walcotti
- †Ottenbyella
  - †Ottenbyella ibexiana – type locality for species
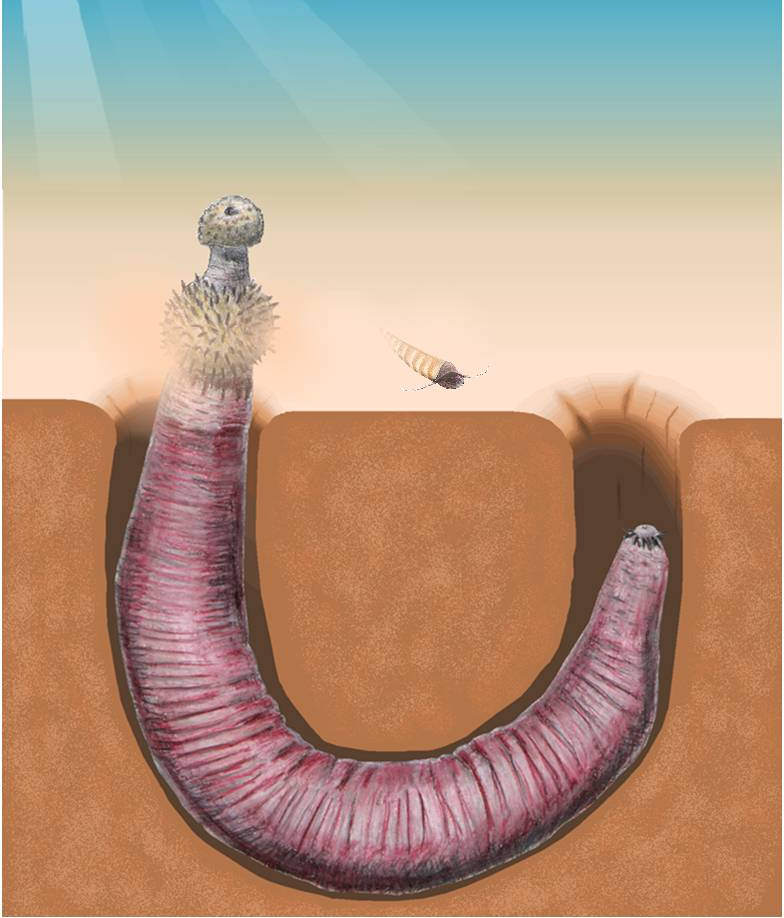
- Life restoration of the Cambrian priapulid worm relative Ottoia
  †Ottoia
  - †Ottoia prolifica
- †Ovatia
  - †Ovatia muralis
- †Owenella
- †Ozarkodina

== P ==
- †Pachycranium
  - †Pachycranium faciclunis
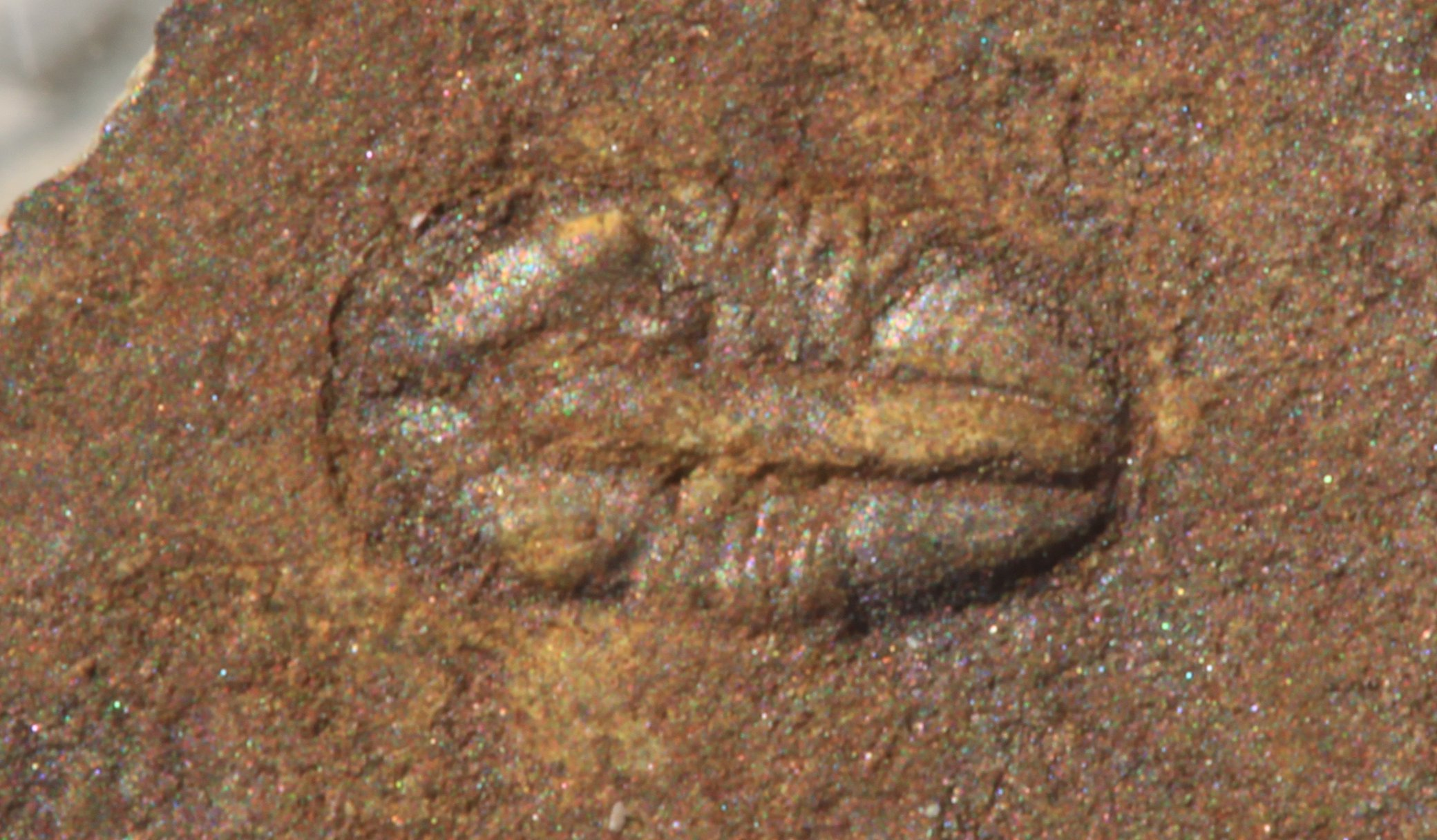
- Fossil of the Cambrian trilobite Pagetia
  †Pagetia
  - †Pagetia fossula – or unidentified comparable form
- †Paladin
- †Palaeacis
- Palaeoaplysina
  - †Palaeoaplysina laminaeformis
- †Palaeobotryllus
- †Palaeoneilo
  - †Palaeoneilo parvaradiatus
- †Palaeoscolex
  - †Palaeoscolex ratcliffei
- †Paleococrinus
- †Palmerocrinus
  - †Palmerocrinus profundus
- †Paltodus
  - †Paltodus jeffersonensis
- †Parabellefontia
  - †Parabellefontia concinna
- †Parabolinoides
- †Paracosmetocrinus
  - †Paracosmetocrinus lundi – type locality for species
- †Parahystricurus
  - †Parahystricurus bispicatus
  - †Parahystricurus fraudator
- †Parajuresania
  - †Parajuresania nebrascensis
- †Parallelodon
- †Parapilekia – tentative report
- †Paraplethopeltis
  - †Paraplethopeltis genacurvus
  - †Paraplethopeltis genarectus
- †Parkaspis
  - †Parkaspis drumensis
- †Peelerophon – tentative report
- †Pelagiella
- †Peniculauris
  - †Peniculauris bassi
  - †Peniculauris ivesi
- †Penniretepora
- †Pentameroides
- †Pentamerus
- †Pericyclus
- †Permophorus
  - †Permophorus albequus
  - †Permophorus occidentalis
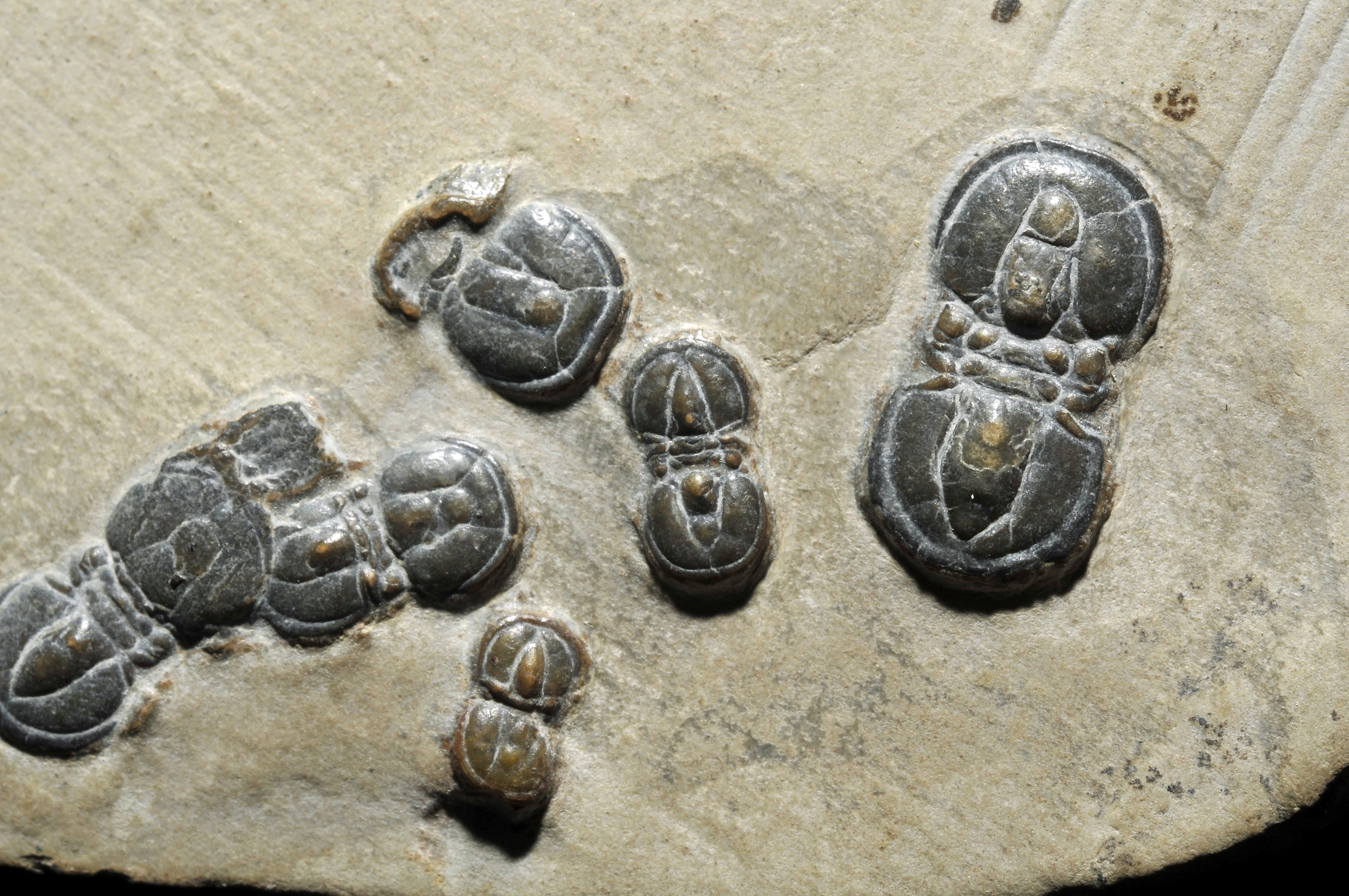
- Assemblage of fossils of the Cambrian trilobite Itagnostus interstrictus, until recently known as Peronopsis interstricta
  †Peronopsis
  - †Peronopsis acadica
  - †Peronopsis amplaxis
  - †Peronopsis bonnerensis
  - †Peronopsis brighamensis
  - †Peronopsis fallax
  - †Peronopsis interstricata
  - †Peronopsis interstricta
  - †Peronopsis montis
  - †Peronopsis scutalis
  - †Peronopsis segmenta
  - †Peronopsis sermenta
- †Perspicaris
  - †Perspicaris ellipsopelta
- †Petasmatherus
  - †Petasmatherus type locality for species A – informal
- †Petigurus
  - †Petigurus inexpectatus
- †Pharkidonotus
  - †Pharkidonotus percarinatus
- †Phillipsia
- †Phosphannulus
- †Phrenophoria
  - †Phrenophoria type locality for species A – informal
- †Phricodothyris
- †Phyllograptus
- †Pilekia
  - †Pilekia trio – tentative report
- Pinna – report made of unidentified related form or using admittedly obsolete nomenclature
- †Plagioglypta
- †Platycrinites
- †Platycrinus
  - †Platycrinus graphicus – or unidentified comparable form
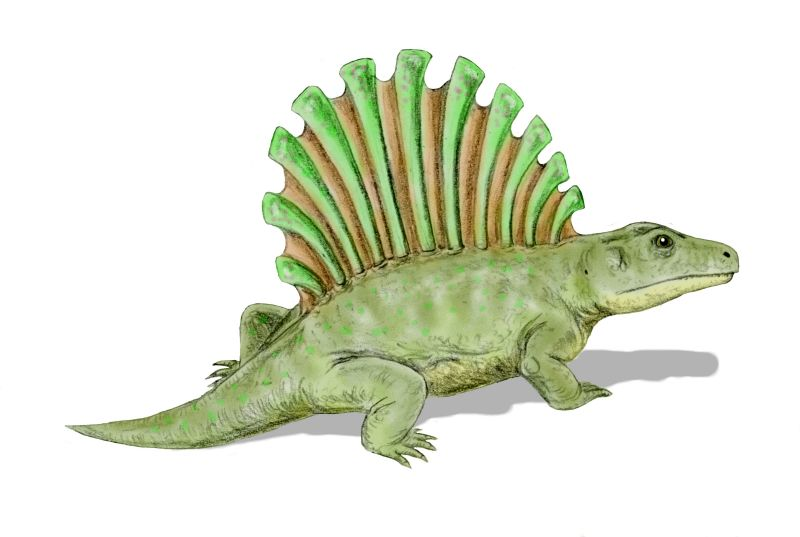
- Life restoration of the Carboniferous-Permian sail-backed amphibian Platyhystrix
  †Platyhystrix – or unidentified comparable form
  - †Platyhystrix rugosus
- †Platyworthenia
- †Plectelasma
  - †Plectelasma type locality for species A – informal
  - †Plectelasma type locality for species B – informal
- †Plethospira
- †Pleurosiphonella
  - †Pleurosiphonella virginica
- †Pliomerops
  - †Pliomerops insolita
- †Polidevcia
  - †Polidevcia bellistriata
  - †Polidevcia obesa
- †Politicurus
  - †Politicurus politus
- †Polypora
  - †Polypora cestriensis
  - †Polypora debilis
  - †Polypora micronodosa
  - †Polypora stansburyensis
- †Ponticulocarpus – type locality for genus
  - †Ponticulocarpus robisoni – type locality for species
- †Praedaraelites
  - †Praedaraelites loeblichi
- †Prehousia
  - †Prehousia alata
  - †Prehousia diverta
- †Presbynileus
  - †Presbynileus elongatus
  - †Presbynileus ibexensis
  - †Presbynileus utahensis
- †Probolionia
- †Prodentalium
  - †Prodentalium canna
- †Productella
- †Productus – report made of unidentified related form or using admittedly obsolete nomenclature
- †Proehmaniella
  - †Proehmaniella basilica
- †Prohedinia
  - †Prohedinia spencei
- †Prolecanites – tentative report
  - †Prolecanites lyoni
- †Prosaukia
- †Protoblechnum
  - †Protoblechnum bradyi – type locality for species
- †Protopliomerella
  - †Protopliomerella contracta
- †Protopliomerops
  - †Protopliomerops quattuor – type locality for species
- †Protopresbynileus
  - †Protopresbynileus willdeni
- †Protoretepora
- †Protospongia
  - †Protospongia elongata
- †Prototreta
- †Protowentzelella
  - †Protowentzelella cystosa
- †Psalikilus
  - †Psalikilus likum
  - †Psalikilus paraspinosum
  - †Psalikilus spinosum
  - †Psalikilus typicum
- †Psephosthenaspis
  - †Psephosthenaspis glabrior
  - †Psephosthenaspis microspinosa
  - †Psephosthenaspis pseudobathyurus
- †Pseudagnostus
- †Pseudoarctolepis
  - †Pseudoarctolepis sharpi
- †Pseudoarctolepsis
  - †Pseudoarctolepsis sharpi
- †Pseudoclelandia
  - †Pseudoclelandia fluxafissura – or unidentified related form
- †Pseudocybele
  - †Pseudocybele altinasuta
  - †Pseudocybele lemurei
  - †Pseudocybele nasuta – type locality for species
- †Pseudodoriodotis
- †Pseudohystricurus
- †Pseudokainella – tentative report
  - †Pseudokainella armatus
- †Pseudomera
  - †Pseudomera arachnopyge
  - †Pseudomera barrandei – or unidentified comparable form
  - †Pseudomera insolita
- †Pseudomonotis
  - †Pseudomonotis equistriata
- †Pseudomphalotrochus
  - †Pseudomphalotrochus incrustatus
- †Pseudoolenoides
  - †Pseudoolenoides acicaudus
  - †Pseudoolenoides aspinosus
  - †Pseudoolenoides dilectus
- †Pseudopermophorus
  - †Pseudopermophorus annettae
- †Pseudoperonopsis
- †Pseudorthoceras
- †Pseudosaratogia – tentative report
- †Pseudoschwagerina
- †Pterocephalia
- †Pteronites
- †Ptychagnostus
  - †Ptychagnostus aculeatus
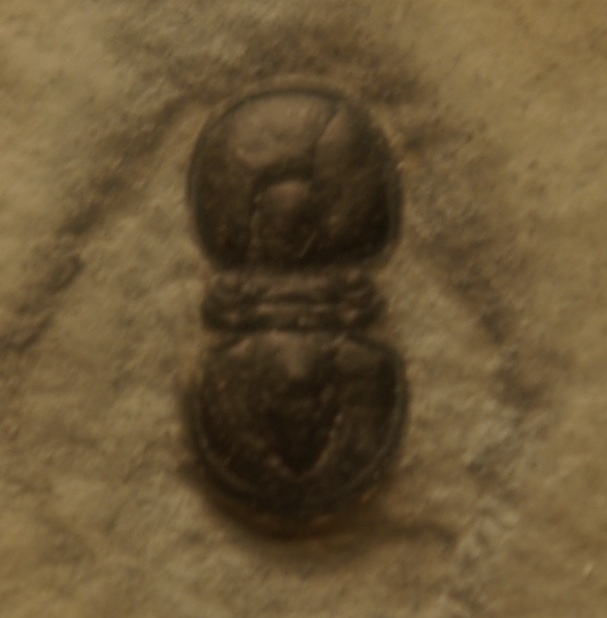
  - Fossil of the Cambrian trilobite Ptychagnostus atavus
    †Ptychagnostus atavus
  - †Ptychagnostus cassis
  - †Ptychagnostus germanus
  - †Ptychagnostus intermedius
  - †Ptychagnostus occultatus
  - †Ptychagnostus punctuosus
  - †Ptychagnostus richmondensis
  - †Ptychagnostus seminula
- †Ptychomphalus
- †Ptychoparella
- †Ptylopora
  - †Ptylopora condrai
  - †Ptylopora eliasi
- †Ptyocephalus
  - †Ptyocephalus accliva
  - †Ptyocephalus declevita – type locality for species
  - †Ptyocephalus declivita
  - †Ptyocephalus versini
  - †Ptyocephalus vigilans
- †Pugnax
  - †Pugnax utah – type locality for species
- †Pugnoides
- †Punctospirifer
  - †Punctospirifer campestris
  - †Punctospirifer kentuckensis
- †Punka
  - †Punka nitida – or unidentified comparable form

== Q ==
- †Quadratia
- †Quadrisonia – tentative report
  - †Quadrisonia lavadamensis
- †Quadrochonetes
  - †Quadrochonetes type locality for species A – informal

== R ==
- †Ramiporalia
- †Raphistoma – tentative report
- †Raphistomina
- †Ratcliffespongia – type locality for genus
  - †Ratcliffespongia perforata – type locality for species
  - †Ratcliffespongia sheeleri
  - †Ratcliffespongia wheeleri – type locality for species
- †Rayonnoceras
  - †Rayonnoceras solidiorme
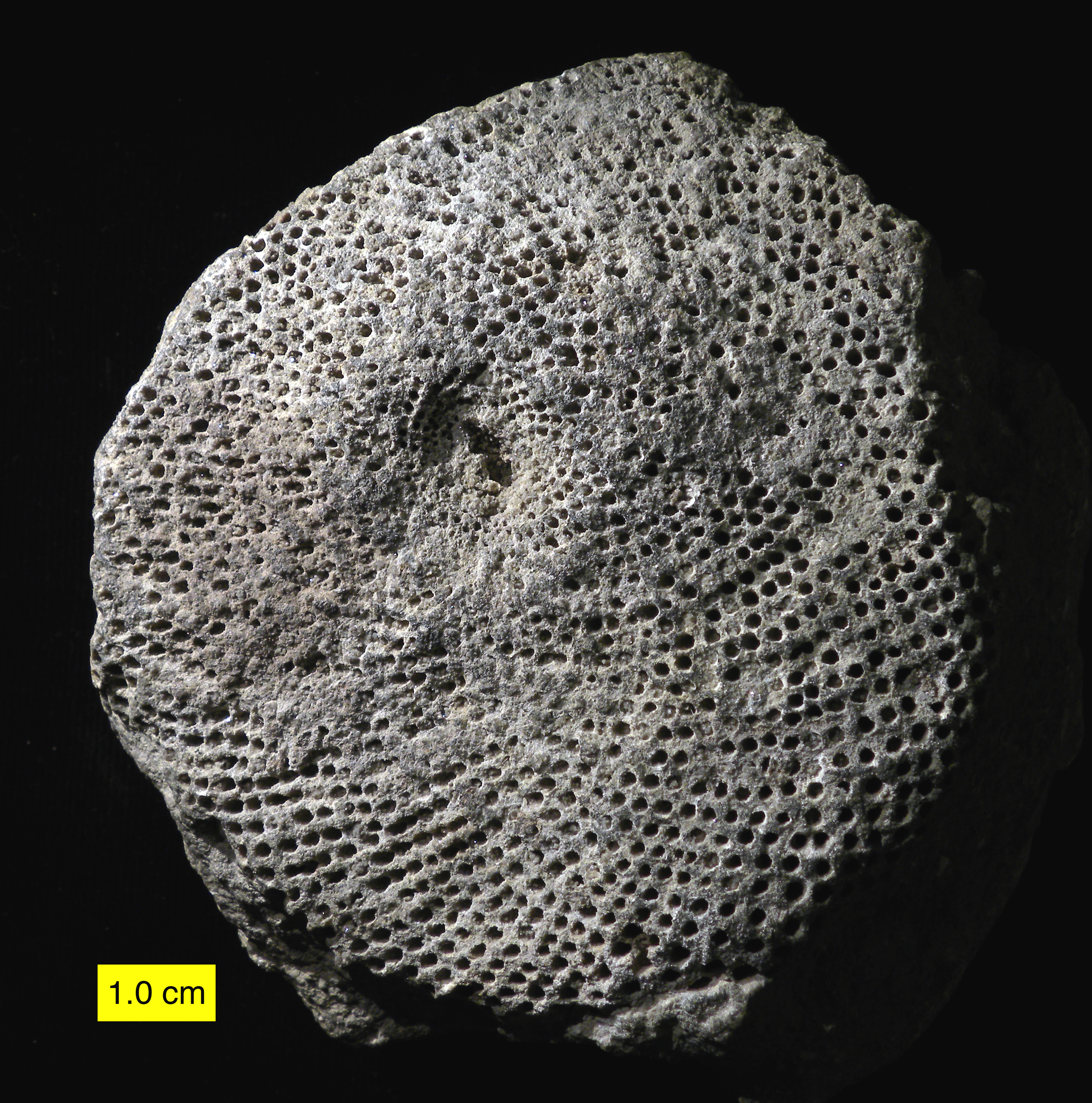
- Fossil of the Early Ordovician-Permian benthic alga Receptaculites
  †Receptaculites
  - †Receptaculites elongatus
  - †Receptaculites mammilaris
  - †Receptaculites mammillaris
- †Rectifenestella
  - †Rectifenestella tenax
- †Regispongia
  - †Regispongia contorta
- †Remopleuridiella
  - †Remopleuridiella angularis – type locality for species
  - †Remopleuridiella caudalimbata
- †Reticulatia
  - †Reticulatia americana
- †Retispira
  - †Retispira cincta – type locality for species
  - †Retispira textilis – or unidentified comparable form
- †Rhabdomeson
  - †Rhabdomeson artum
- †Rhipidomella
  - †Rhipidomella missouriensis
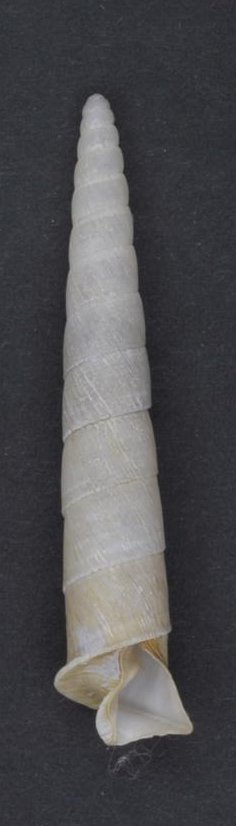
- Shell of a Rhodea land snail
  †Rhodea
  - †Rhodea vespertina
- †Rhombopora
  - †Rhombopora tenuirama
- †Rhynchopora
- †Ribeiria
  - †Ribeiria lucan
- †Rigbyocarpus – type locality for genus
  - †Rigbyocarpus ebracteatus – type locality for species
- †Rodea
  - †Rodea vespertina – or unidentified comparable form
- †Rossaspis
  - †Rossaspis superciliosa
- †Rossicurus
  - †Rossicurus lepidus
- †Rugatia
  - †Rugatia occidentalis
- †Rugosochonetes
  - †Rugosochonetes loganensis
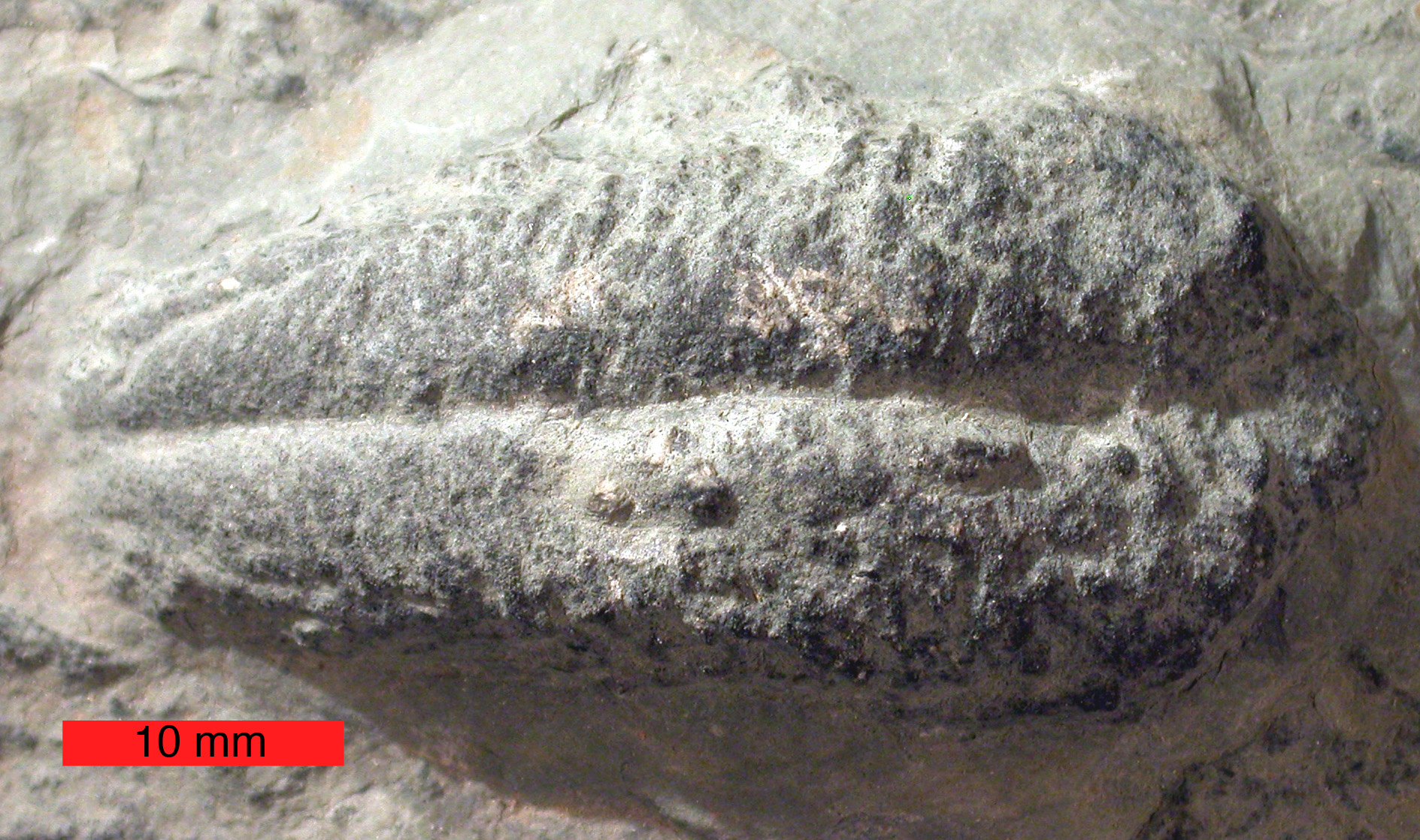
- Fossil of the arthropod burrow ichnogenus Rusophycus
  †Rusophycus
- †Rylstonia – tentative report

== S ==
- †Saffordotaxis
- †Sanguinolites
  - †Sanguinolites elongatus – type locality for species
- †Saukia
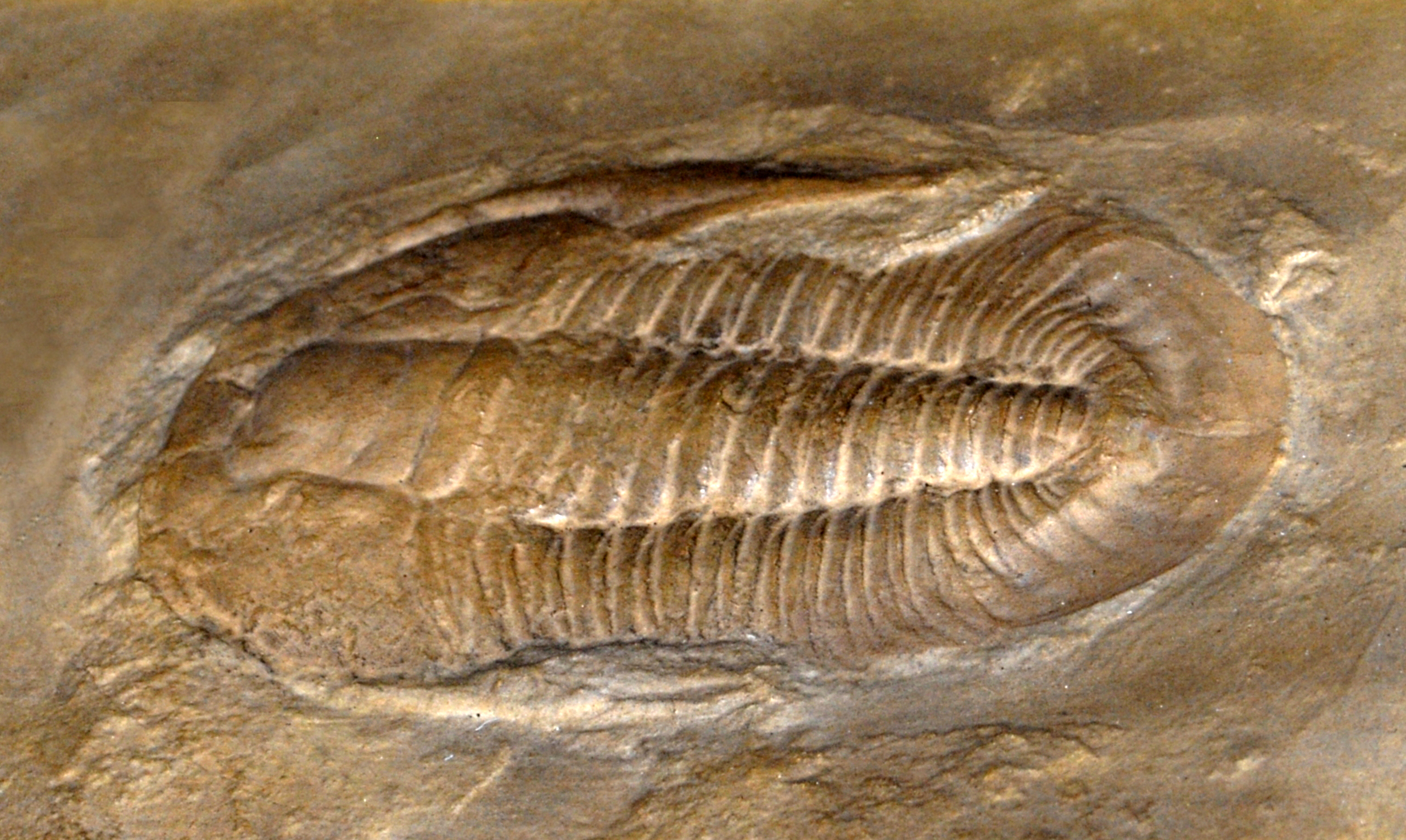
- Fossil of the Cambrian-Ordovician trilobite Saukiella
  †Saukiella
- †Scandodus
  - †Scandodus furnishi
- †Scaphellina – tentative report
- †Scenella
  - †Scenella radians
- †Schizambon
  - †Schizambon obtusus – type locality for species
- †Schizodus
  - †Schizodus bifidus
  - †Schizodus subovatus – type locality for species
- †Schizophoria
- †Schmalenseeia
- †Schuchertella
  - †Schuchertella lens
- †Schwagerina
- †Scolicia
- †Scolopodus
  - †Scolopodus gracilis
  - †Scolopodus pseudoquadratus
  - †Scolopodus quadraplicatus
  - †Scolopodus rex
- †Seelyia
- †Selenocoryphe – type locality for genus
  - †Selenocoryphe platyura – type locality for species
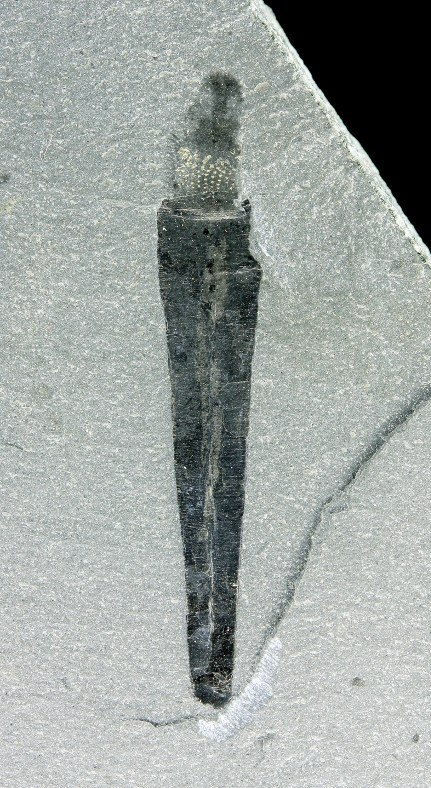
- Fossil of the Cambrian priapulid worm Selkirkia
  †Selkirkia
  - †Selkirkia columbia – or unidentified comparable form
  - †Selkirkia spencei
  - †Selkirkia willoughby
- †Sentinelia – tentative report
  - †Sentinelia draco – or unidentified comparable form
- †Septimyalina
  - †Septimyalina burmai – tentative report
- †Septopora
  - †Septopora ulrichi
- †Shoshonorthis
  - †Shoshonorthis michaelis
  - †Shoshonorthis swanensis
- †Shumardia
  - †Shumardia exopthalmus
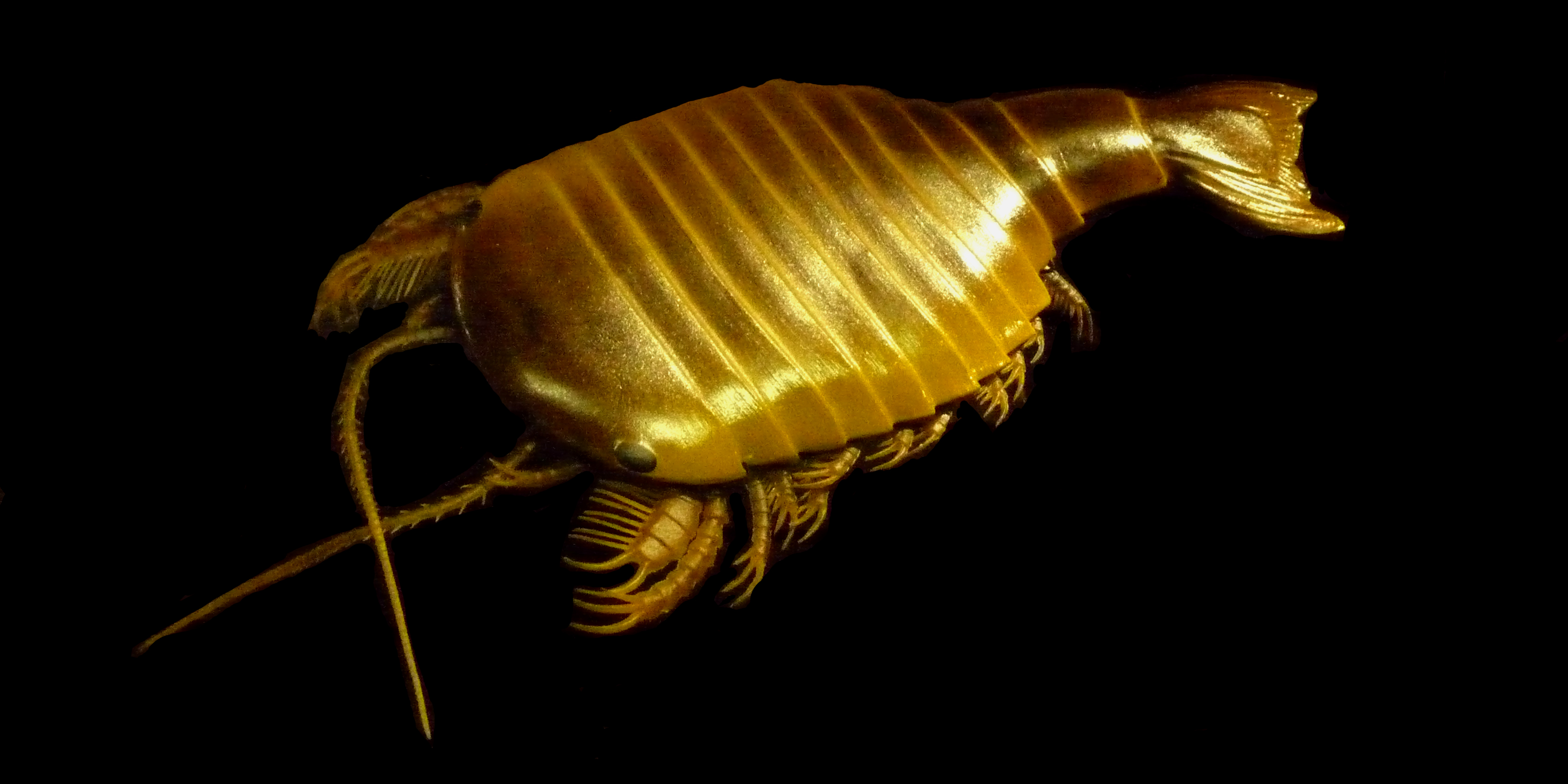
- Restorative model of the Cambrian arthropod Sidneyia
  †Sidneyia
- †Sigillaria
  - †Sigillaria brardii
- †Sinuella – tentative report
- †Siphonobolus – tentative report
- †Spathognathus
  - †Spathognathus cristulus
  - †Spathognathus scitulus
- †Spencella
  - †Spencella utahensa – type locality for species
  - †Spencella utahensis
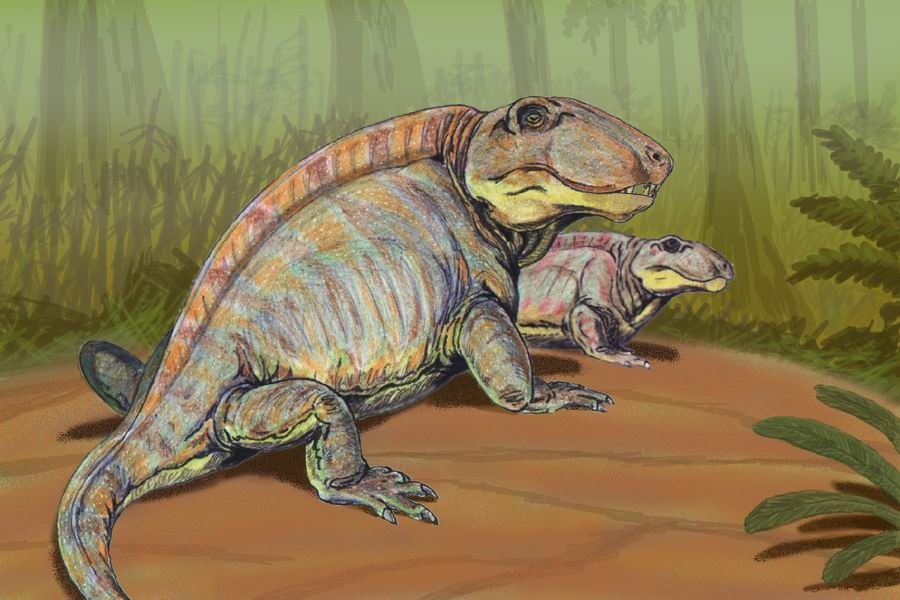
- Life restoration of the Carboniferous-Permian synapsid (mammal precursor) Sphenacodon
  Sphenacodon
  - †Sphenacodon ferocior – or unidentified comparable form
- †Sphenophyllostachys – tentative report
- †Sphenophyllum
  - †Sphenophyllum angustifolium
  - †Sphenophyllum verticillatum
- †Sphenopteridium
  - †Sphenopteridium dissectum
  - †Sphenopteridium zaitzeffii – type locality for species
- †Sphenopteris
  - †Sphenopteris diphlebia – type locality for species
- †Sphenosteges
  - †Sphenosteges hispidus
- †Spinilingula
  - †Spinilingula prisca – type locality for species
- †Spinofacia – type locality for genus
  - †Spinofacia pectinatus – type locality for species
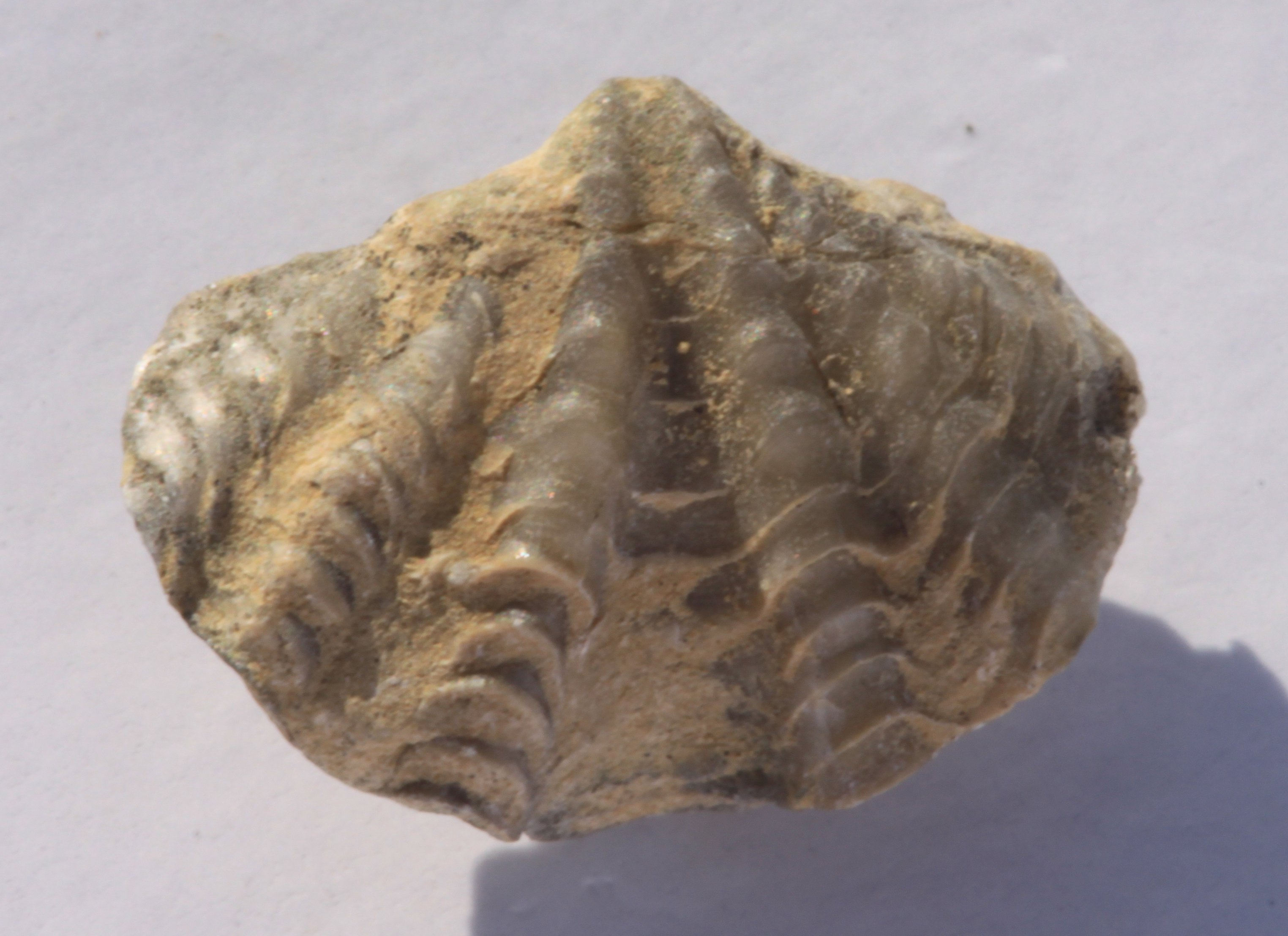
- Fossilized shell of the Late Ordovician-Late Triassic brachiopod Spirifer
  †Spirifer
  - †Spirifer centronatus
  - †Spirifer opimus
  - †Spirifer rockymountanus
- †Spiriferina
- †Spirinella
  - †Spirinella pauciplicata
- Spirorbis
- †Squamaria
- †Squamularia – report made of unidentified related form or using admittedly obsolete nomenclature
- †Stenolobulites
  - †Stenolobulites simulator
  - †Stenolobulites sinuosus
- †Stenopora
  - †Stenopora confusionensis
- †Stenoporella
  - †Stenoporella mineriensis
- †Stenorhachis – tentative report
  - †Stenorhachis genalticurvatus
- †Stibaraster – type locality for genus
  - †Stibaraster ratcliffei – type locality for species
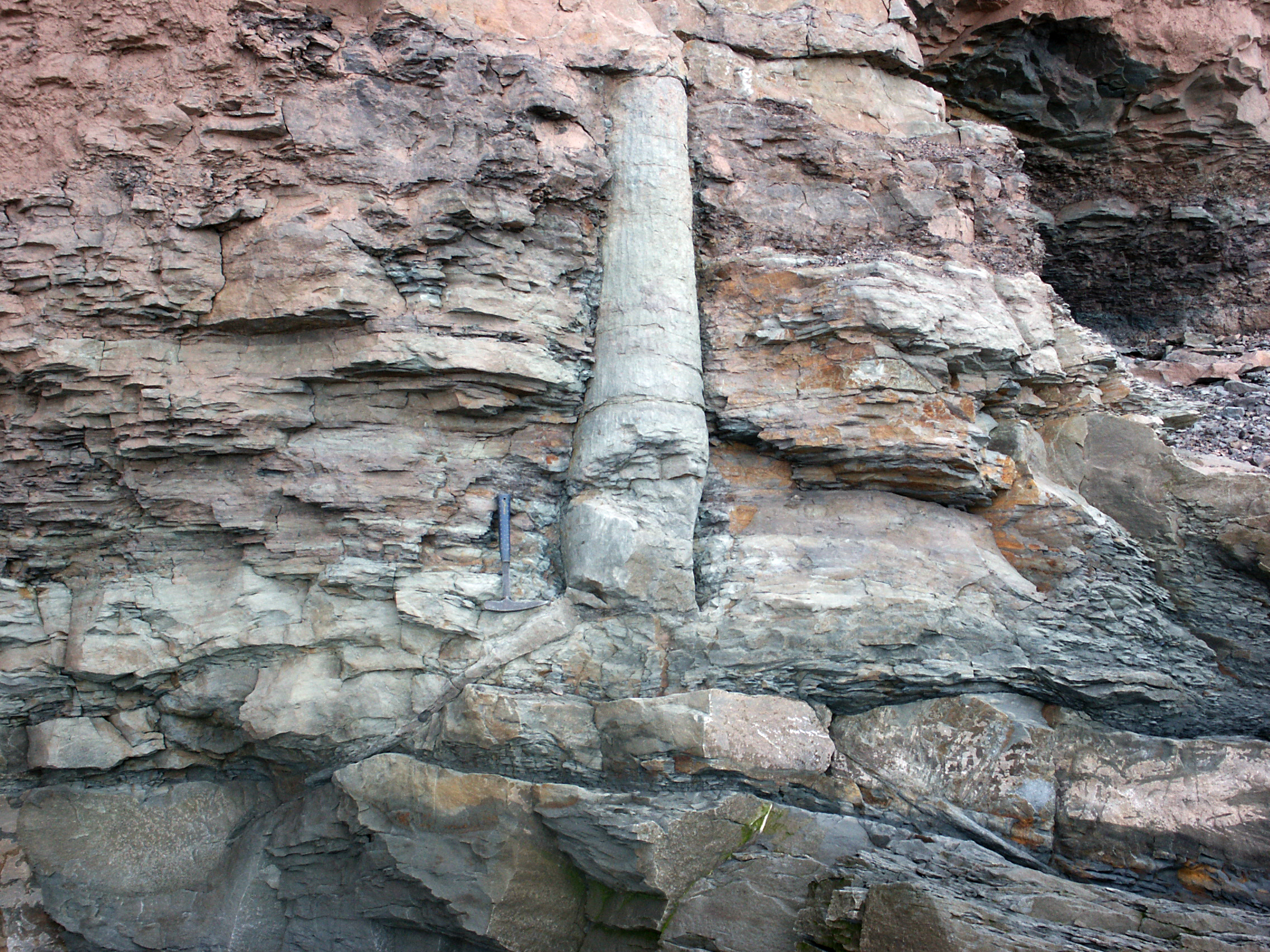
- Fossil preserved in situ of a Carboniferous tree-like club moss relative with attached Stigmaria rhizome system
  †Stigmaria
  - †Stigmaria ficoides
- †Stigmariopsis
  - †Stigmariopsis anglica
- †Stolodus – or unidentified related form
  - †Stolodus stola
- †Straparollus
- †Streblochondria
- †Strebloplax
  - †Strebloplax pertusa
- †Streblopteria
  - †Streblopteria montpelierensis
- †Streblotrypa
  - †Streblotrypa angulatum
- †Streptelasma
- †Striatifera
  - †Striatifera brazeriana
- †Strigambitus
  - †Strigambitus utahensis
- †Strobeus – or unidentified related form
- †Sulcoretepora
- †Supaia
  - †Supaia rigida
- †Symphysurina
  - †Symphysurina cleora – or unidentified comparable form
  - †Symphysurina globocapitella
  - †Symphysurina illaenoides
  - †Symphysurina spicata – or unidentified comparable form
  - †Symphysurina uncaspicata
  - †Symphysurina walcotti
- †Symphysurus – tentative report
- †Synarmocrinus
  - †Synarmocrinus depressus – type locality for species
- †Syntrophina
  - †Syntrophina campbelli – or unidentified comparable form
  - †Syntrophina carinifera
- †Syntrophopsis
  - †Syntrophopsis polita
  - †Syntrophopsis transversa
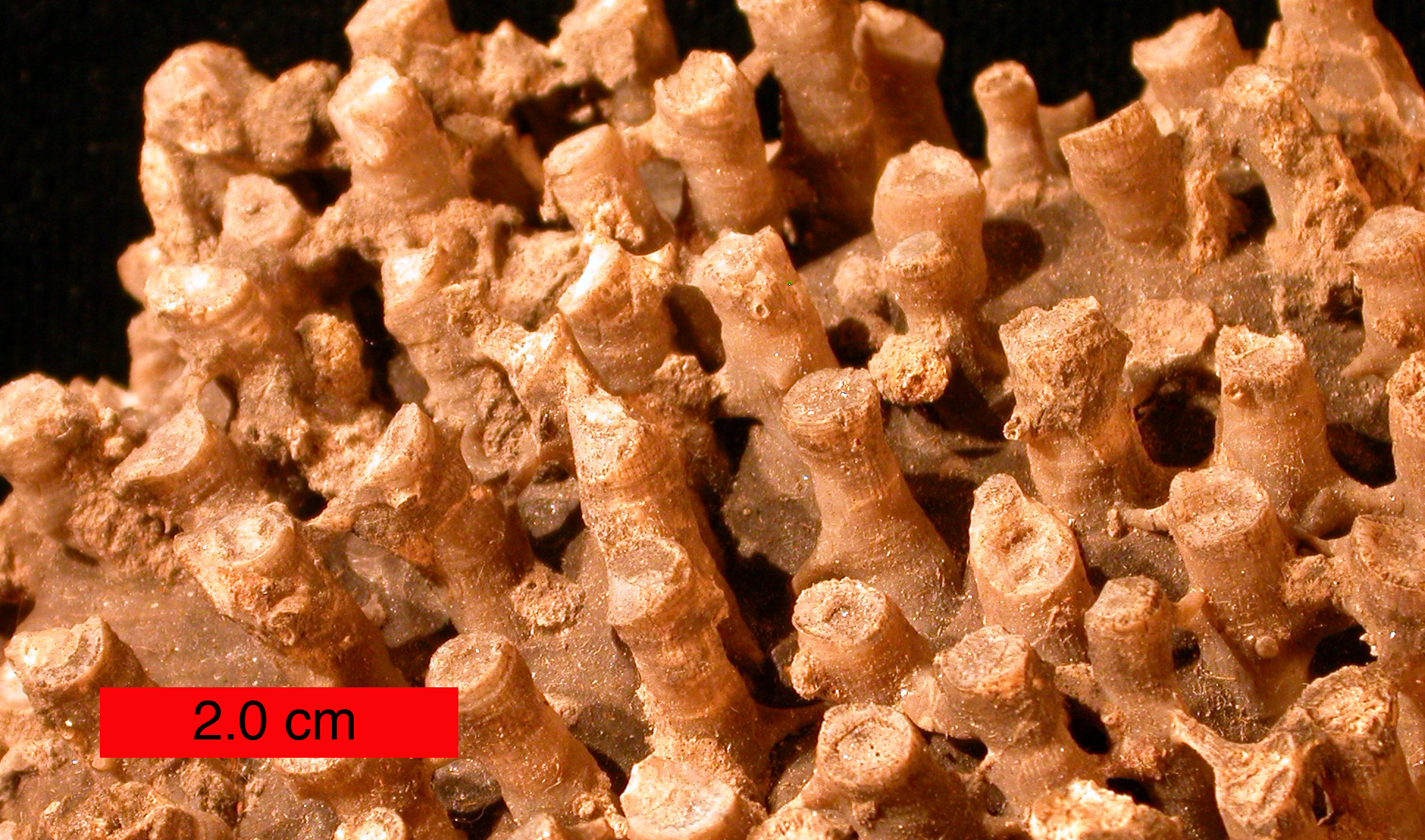
- Fossil of the Devonian tabulate coral Syringopora
  †Syringopora
  - †Syringopora aculeata
  - †Syringopora surcularia
- †Syringothyris
  - †Syringothyris textus

== T ==
- †Tabulipora
  - †Tabulipora atacta
  - †Tabulipora carbonaria
  - †Tabulipora ricta
  - †Tabulipora sarcinula
  - †Tabulipora stragula
- †Taeniopteris
- †Talpaspongia
  - †Talpaspongia clavata
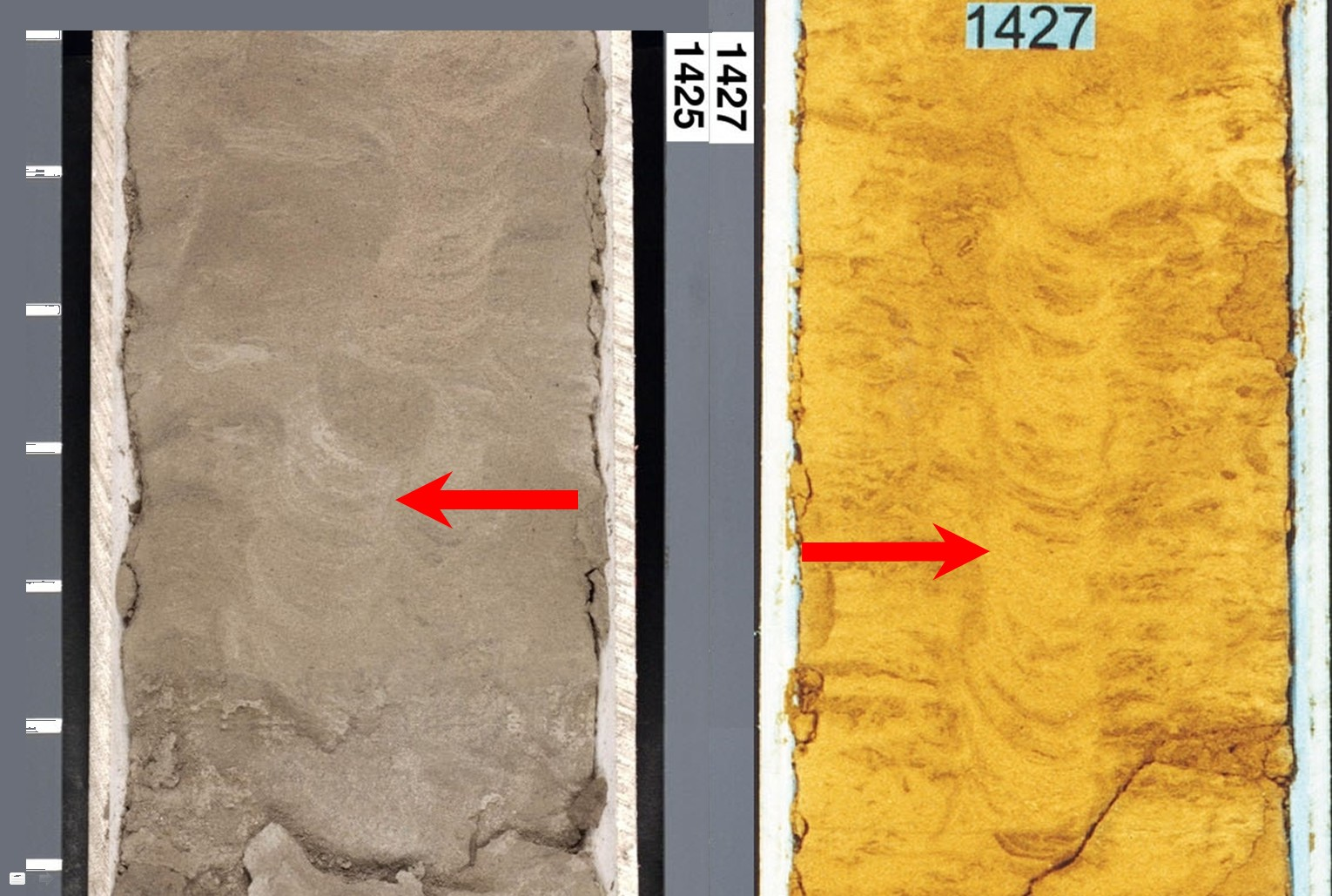
- Fossil of the feeding trace ichnogenus Teichichnus
  †Teichichnus – tentative report
- †Telangium
  - †Telangium affine
- †Terranovella
- †Tesselacauda
  - †Tesselacauda depressa – or unidentified comparable form
- †Testiispongia – type locality for genus
  - †Testiispongia venula – type locality for species
- †Testispongia
  - †Testispongia venula
- †Tetragraptus
  - †Tetragraptus quadribrachiatus – or unidentified comparable form
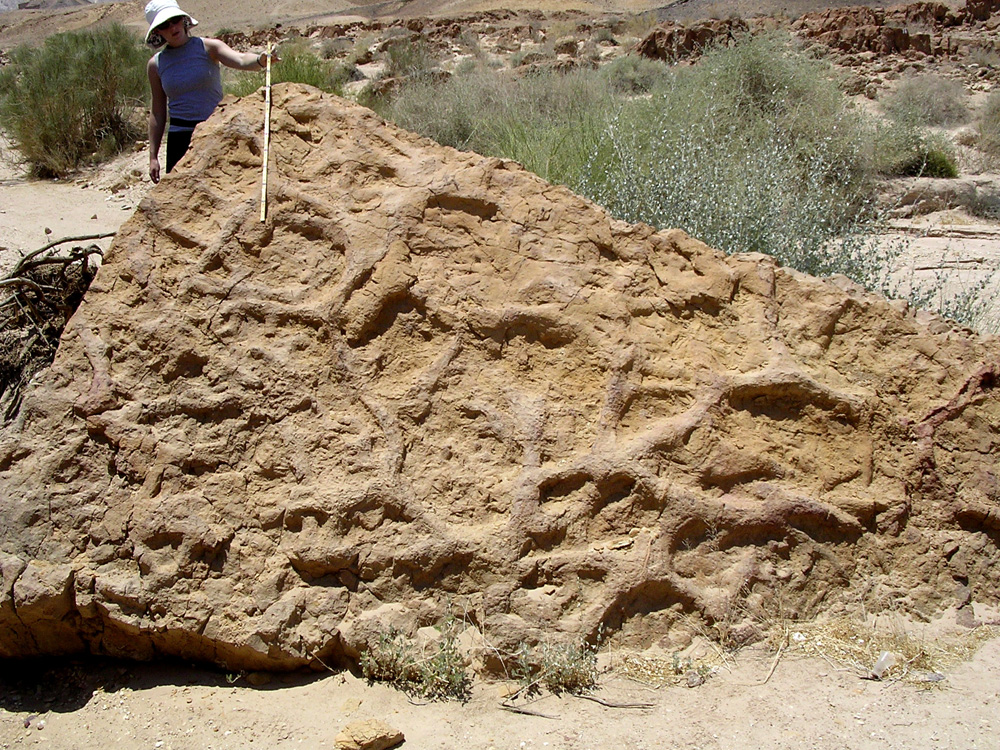
- Fossils of the burrow ichnogenus Thalassinoides
  †Thalassinoides – tentative report
- †Thamniscus
  - †Thamniscus raribifurcatus
- †Thamnosia – or unidentified comparable form
  - †Thamnosia arctica – tentative report
- †Timania
- †Timaniella
  - †Timaniella pseudocamerata
- †Tingia
  - †Tingia placida – type locality for species
- †Tomagnostella
  - †Tomagnostella exsculpta
- †Tonkinella
  - †Tonkinella breviceps
  - †Tonkinella valida
- †Torynifer
- †Totiglobus – tentative report
  - †Totiglobus lloydi
- †Trace
  - †Trace fossil
- †Trachycheilus
  - †Trachycheilus granulosus
  - †Trachycheilus whirlwindensis
- †Trematorthis – tentative report
- †Tricitictes
- †Tricrepicephalus
  - †Tricrepicephalus teres
- †Trigonocarpus
  - †Trigonocarpus noeggerathii
- †Trigonocerca
  - †Trigonocerca typica
- †Trigonocercella
  - †Trigonocercella acuta
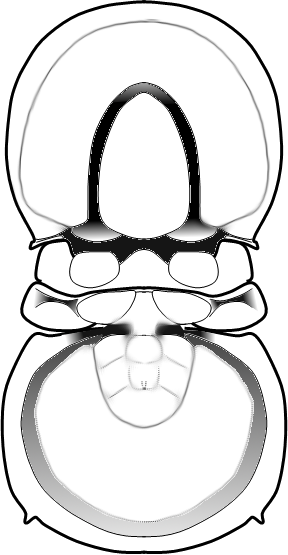
- Illustration of a fossil of the Cambrian trilobite Trinodus
  †Trinodus
- †Triplagnostus
  - †Triplagnostus gibbus
- †Triplophylites
  - †Triplophylites compressus
  - †Triplophylites ellipticus
  - †Triplophylites subcrassus
- †Triticites
- †Tritoechia
  - †Tritoechia loganensis
  - †Tritoechia sinuata
- †Trocholites
- †Trochophyllum – tentative report
- †Trymataspis
  - †Trymataspis depressa
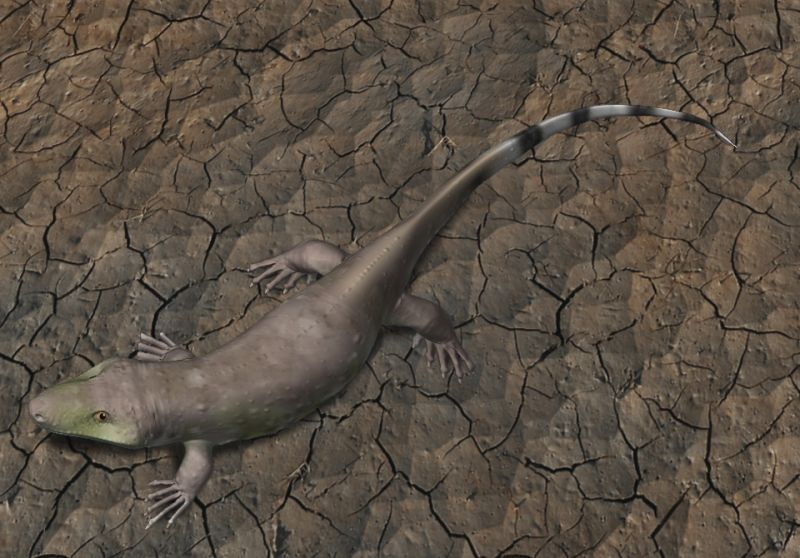
- Restoration of the Permian reptile relative Tseajaia
  †Tseajaia
  - †Tseajaia campi – type locality for species
- †Tulepyge
  - †Tulepyge tulensis – type locality for species
- †Tumicephalus
  - †Tumicephalus depressus
- †Tuzoia
  - †Tuzoia argenta
  - †Tuzoia guntheri
  - †Tuzoia retifera
- †Tympanuella
  - †Tympanuella transversa

== U ==
- †Ufimia
- †Ulrichodina – tentative report
- †Uromystrum
  - †Uromystrum validum – or unidentified comparable form
- †Utagnostus
  - †Utagnostus trispinulus
- †Utahacanthus – type locality for genus
  - †Utahacanthus guntheri – type locality for species
- †Utahcaris
  - †Utahcaris orion
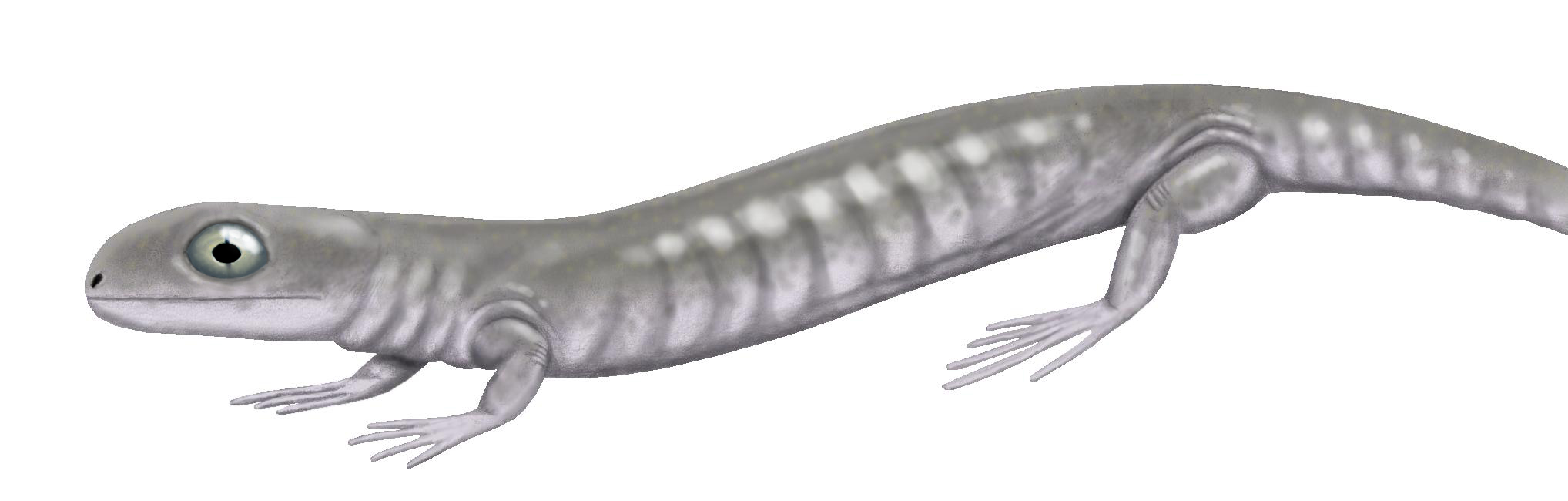
- Life restoration of the Carboniferous amphibian Utaherpeton
  †Utaherpeton – type locality for genus
  - †Utaherpeton franklini – type locality for species
- †Utaspis
  - †Utaspis marjumensis

== V ==
- †Valospongia
  - †Valospongia gigantis – type locality for species
  - †Valospongia gigantus
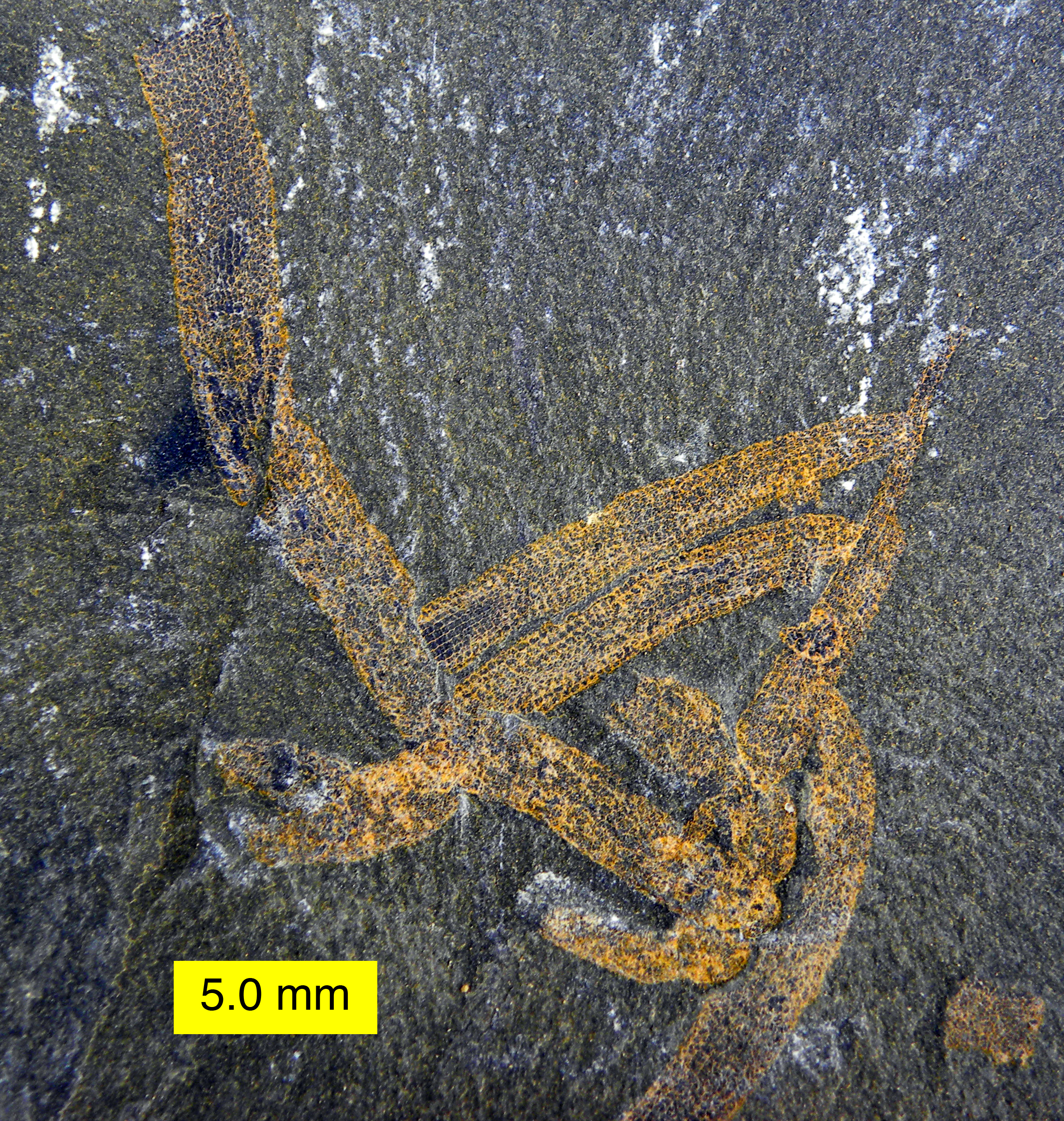
- Fossil of the Cambrian-Silurian sponge Vauxia
  †Vauxia
  - †Vauxia bellula
  - †Vauxia gracilenta
  - †Vauxia magna – type locality for species
- †Verkhotomia
  - †Verkhotomia plenoides – or unidentified comparable form
- †Vesiculophyllum
- †Virgiana
  - †Virgiana utahensis – type locality for species
- †Vnigripecten
  - †Vnigripecten phosphaticus – or unidentified comparable form
- †Vorticina
  - †Vorticina vortex – type locality for species

== W ==
- †Waagenites
  - †Waagenites type locality for species A – informal
- †Waagenoconcha
- †Wahwahlingula
  - †Wahwahlingula sevierensis – type locality for species
- †Walcottoceras – tentative report
  - †Walcottoceras monsense
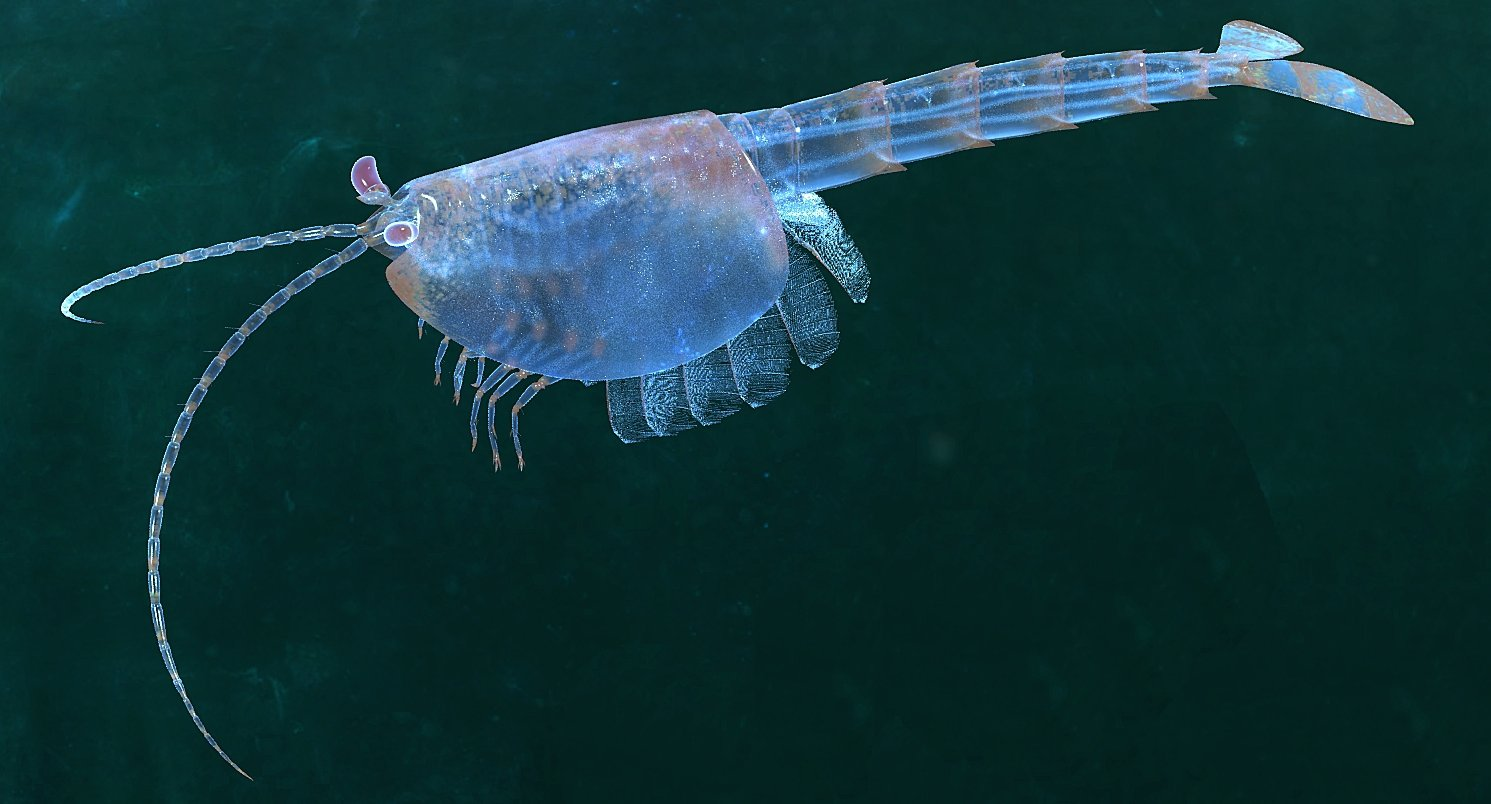
- Restoration of the Cambrian arthropod Waptia
  †Waptia
  - †Waptia fieldensis – or unidentified comparable form
- †Warthia – tentative report
- †Weeksina
  - †Weeksina unispina
- †Wellerella
  - †Wellerella osagensis
  - †Wellerella tetrahedra
- †Wewokella
  - †Wewokella solida
- †Wilkingia
- †Wimanella
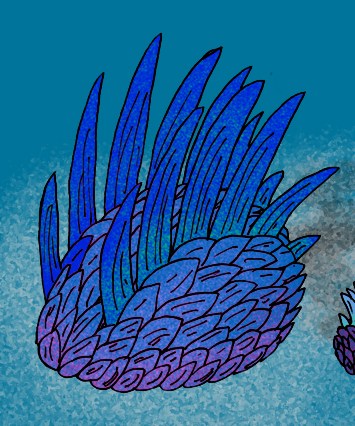
- Life restoration of the Cambrian possible mollusc Wiwaxia
  †Wiwaxia
  - †Wiwaxia corrugata
- †Worthenia

== X ==
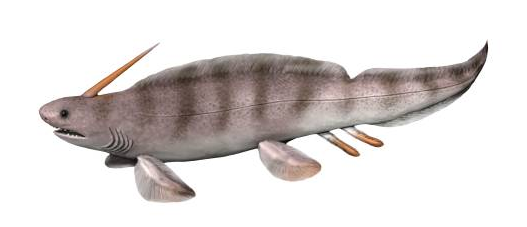
- Restoration of the Late Devonian–Triassic freshwater shark Xenacanthus
  †Xenacanthus – or unidentified related form
  - †Xenacanthus texensis
- †Xenostegium
  - †Xenostegium acuminferentis – or unidentified comparable form
  - †Xenostegium franklinense
- †Xestotrema
  - †Xestotrema pulchrum
- †Xystocrania – tentative report
  - †Xystocrania perforator

== Y ==
- †Yakia – tentative report
- †Yakovlevia
  - †Yakovlevia multistriata
- †Yuknessaspis
  - †Yuknessaspis benningtonis – type locality for species
- †Yuknessia
  - †Yuknessia simplex
- †Yunnania

== Z ==
- †Zacanthoides
  - †Zacanthoides divergens
  - †Zacanthoides divergensis
  - †Zacanthoides fronslicinus
  - †Zacanthoides grabaui
  - †Zacanthoides idahoensis
  - †Zacanthoides prolixis
- †Zaphrentites
- †Zhanatella
  - †Zhanatella utahensis
- †Zittelella
  - †Zittelella clarae – or unidentified comparable form
- †Zittelloceras
