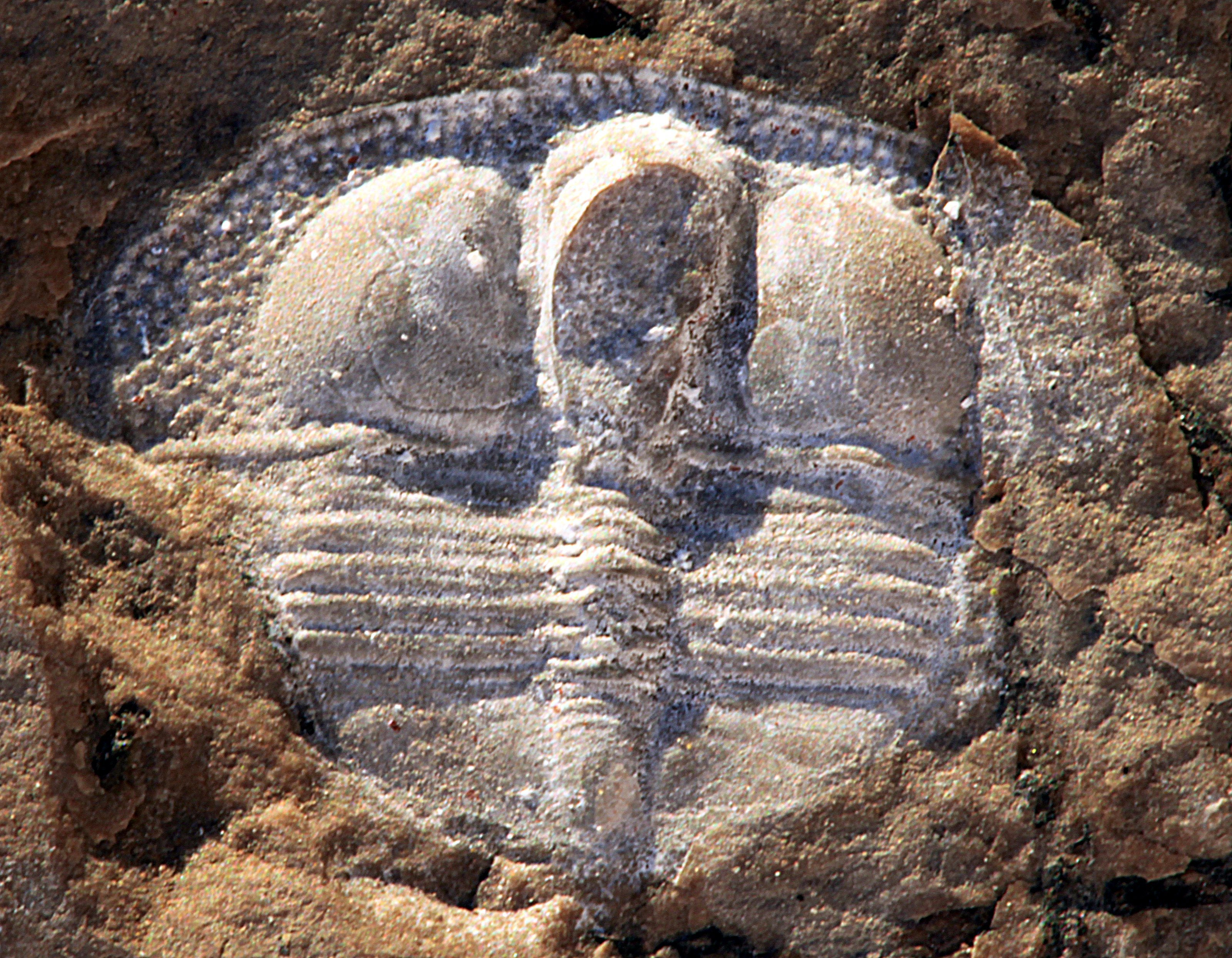
- Cryptolithoides ulrichi, a trilobite in the family Trinucleidae

Scientific classification
- Kingdom: Animalia
- Phylum: Arthropoda
- Clade: †Artiopoda
- Class: †Trilobita
- Order: †Asaphida
- Superfamily: †Trinucleioidea

Families
- See text

= Trinucleioidea =

Trinucleioidea Temporal range: Furongian–Silurian

Superfamily of trilobites

Trinucleioidea is a superfamily of trilobites. Traditionally placed within the Asaphida, it is now sometimes considered its own order, Trinucleida.

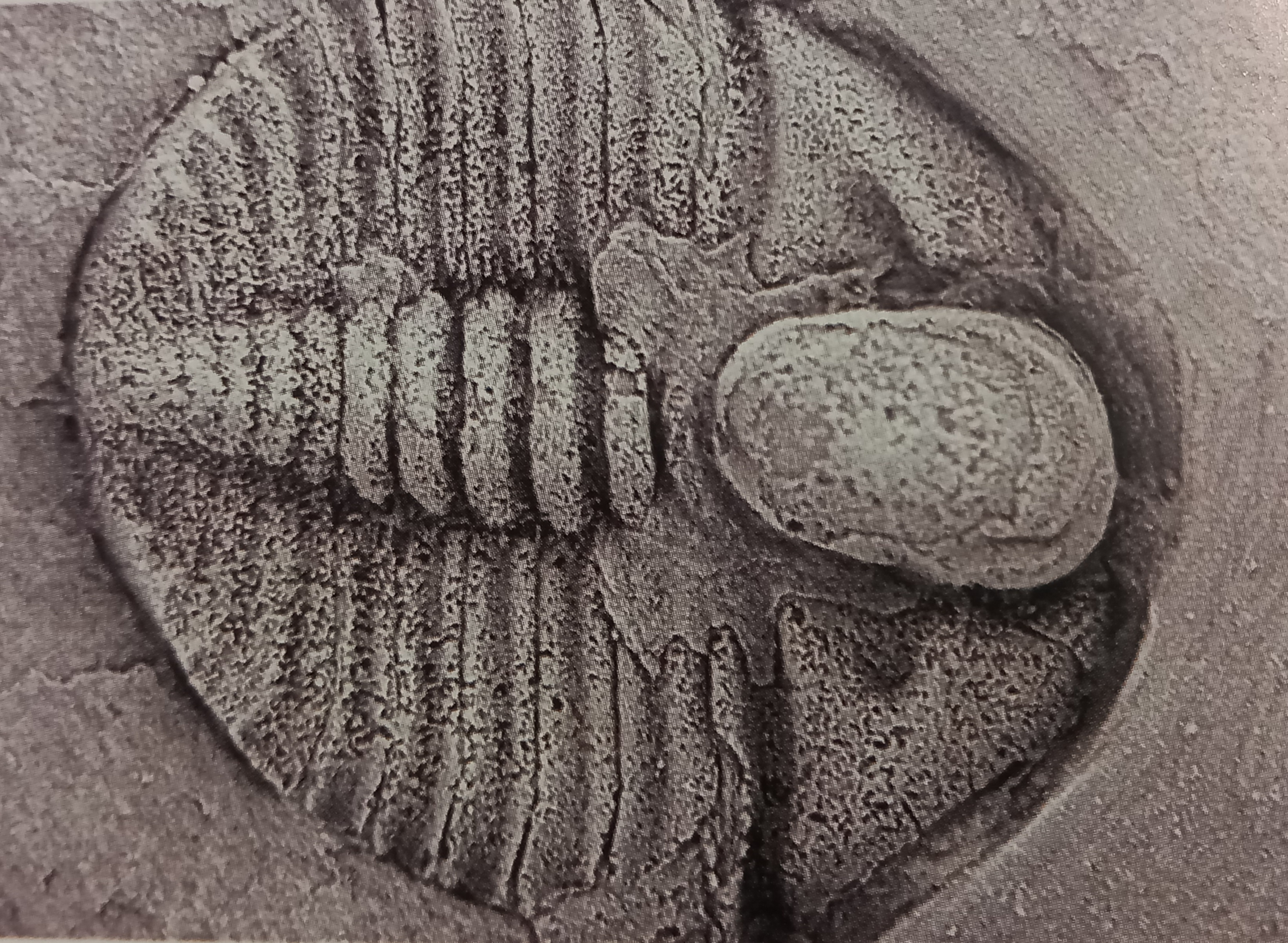
Damghanampyx ghobadipour fossil from Lashkark Formation, Ordovician, Damghan, Iran

== Taxonomy ==
There are five families in the super family; they are the: Alataspididae, Dionididae, Liostracinidae, Raphiophoridae, and Trinucleidae

=== Families and genera ===
Alsataspididae: Ajrikina, Alataupleura, Araiopleura, Calycinoidia, Caputrotundum, Clavatellus, Falanaspis, Hapalopleura, Huamiaocephalus, Jegorovaia, Jiangxiaspis, Orometopus, Pagometopus, Palquiella, Paracalymenemene, Plesioparabolina, Pyrimetopus, Rhadinopleura, Seleneceme, Sibiriopleura, Skljarella, Spirantyx, Trigocephalus, Yumenaspis, Zacompsus.

Dionididae: Aethedionide, Digrypos, Dionide, Dionideina, Dionidella, Huangnigangia, Paradionide, Tongxinaspis, Trinucleoides.

Liostracinidae: Aplexura, Doremataspis, Liostracina, Lynaspis.

Raphiophoridae: Ampyx, Ampyxella, Ampyxina, Ampyxinella, Ampyxoides, Anisonotella, Bulbaspis, Caganaspis, Carinocranium, Cerampyx, Cnemidopyge, Collis, Edmundsonia, Ellsaspis, Endymionia, Globampyx, Jiuxiella, Kanlingia, Lonchodomas, Malinaspis, Malongullia, Mendolaspis, Metalonchodomas, Miaopopsis, Nambeetella, Nanshanaspis, Parabulbaspis, Parampyx, Pseudampyxina, Pytine, Raphioampyx, Raphiophorus, Raymondella, Rhombampyx, Salteria, Sinampyxina, Sinoluia, Taklamakania.

Trinucleidae: Anebolithus, Australomyttonia, Bancroftolithus, Bergamia, Bettonolithus, Botrioides, Broeggerolithus, Costonia, Cryptolithoides, Cryptolithus, Deanaspis, Declivolithus, Decordinaspis, Eirelithus, Famatinolithus, Furcalithus, Guandacolithus, Gymnostomix, Hanchungolithus, Huenickenolithus, Incaia, Jianxilithus, Lloydolithus, Lordshillia, Marekolithus, Marrolithoides, Marrolithus, ?Microdiscus, Myinda, Myindella, Myttonia, Nankinolithus, Ningkianolithus, Novaspis, Onnia, Paratretaspis, Paratrinucleus, Parkesolithus, Pragolithus, Protoincaia, Protolloydolithus, Reedolithus, Reuscholithus, Salterolithus, Stapeleyelta, Telaeomarrolithus, Tetrapsetlium, Tretaspis, Trinucleus, Whittardolithus, Xiushuilithus, Yinpanolithus.
