= Palaeontology in Wales =

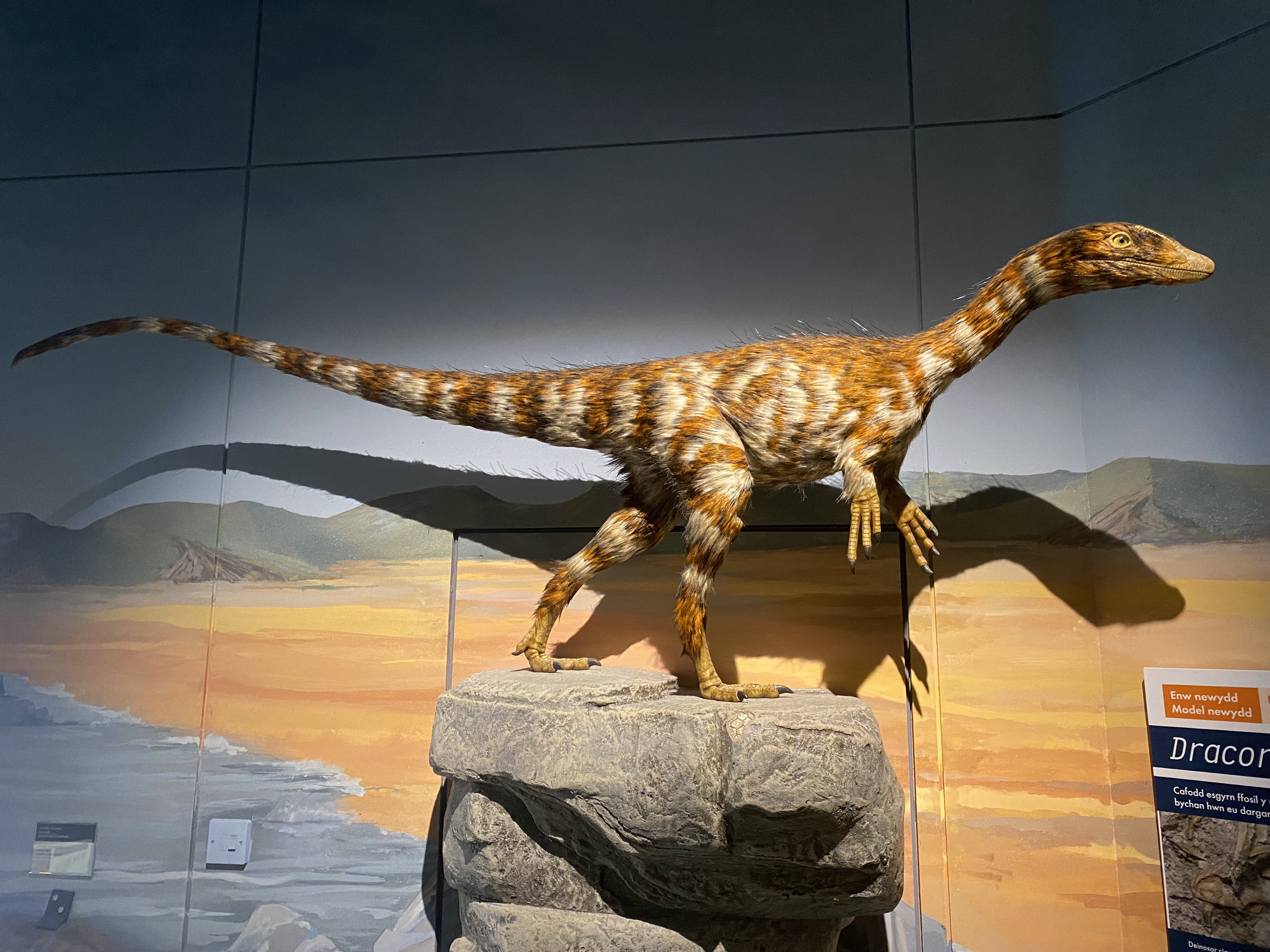
A lifesize model of a Dracoraptor at the National Museum Cardiff

Palaeontology in Wales is palaeontological research occurring in Wales.

== Cambrian period ==
- Anebolithus is a genus of trilobites found in Gilwern Hill, Powys, Wales. Anebolithus, like other trinucleids, was blind.
- Homagnostus is a genus of trilobite in the order Agnostida, which existed in what is now north Wales. It was described by Howell in 1935. The genus was originally considered to be Agnostus pisiformis var. obesus (Belt, 1867).

== Ordovician period ==
- Bettonolithus is a genus of trilobites of the Order Asaphida. It is in the family Trinucleidae. Fossil specimens have been found in the Lower Ordovician rocks of Gilwern Hill in Powys, Wales.
- Brachyopterus is a genus of prehistoric eurypterid of the family Rhenopteridae. It is one of the earliest known eurypterids, having been recovered from Middle Ordovician deposits in Montgomeryshire, Wales.
- Lloydolithus is a genus of trilobites from the Late Ordovician of Wales.
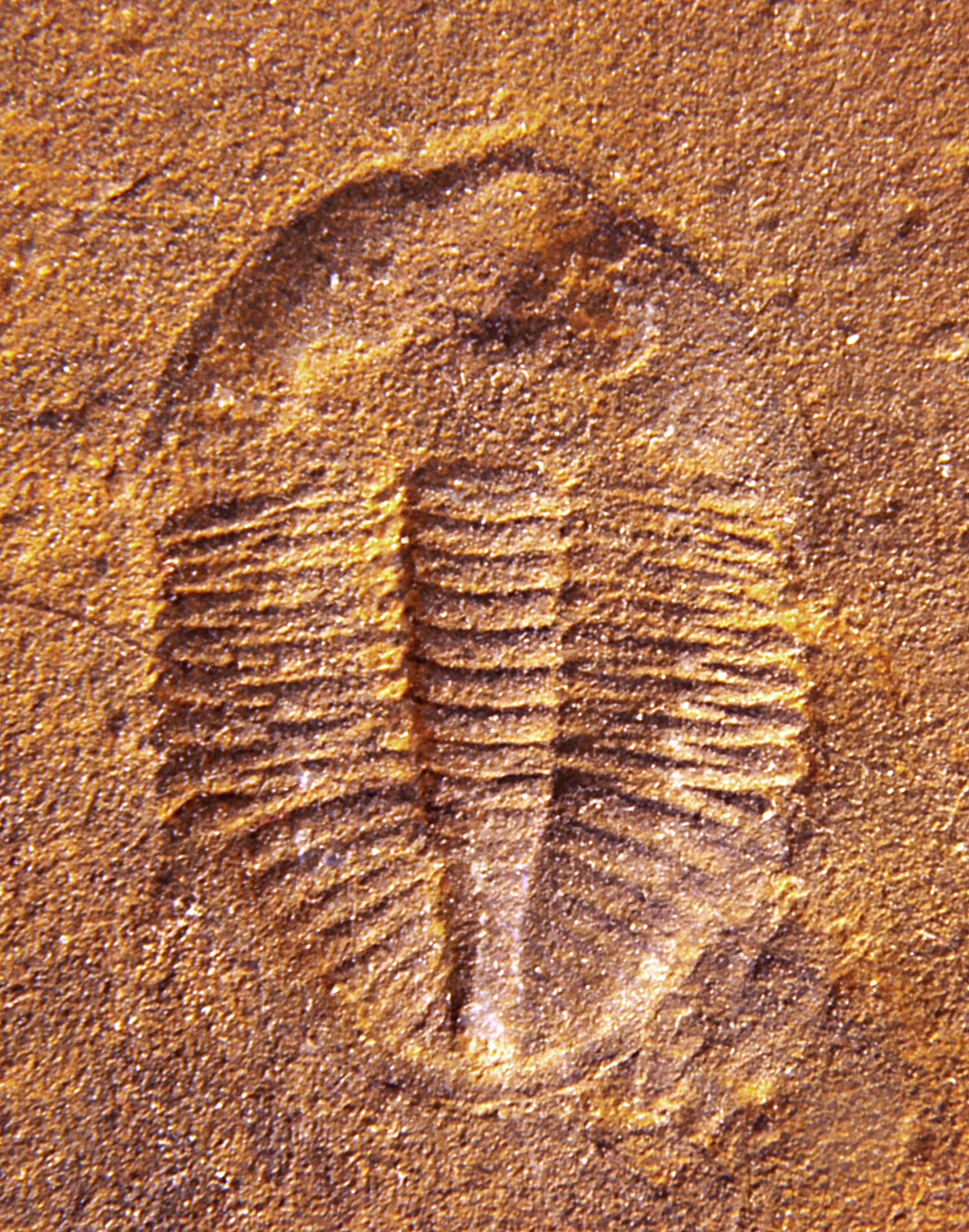
  Ogygiocarella debuchii fossil, Wales.
- Mieridduryn is a genus of extinct dinocaridid arthropod that lived during the Middle Ordovician of what is now the United Kingdom.
- Ogygiocarella Brongniart, 1822, is a genus of asaphid trilobites. It occurred during the Middle Ordovician.
- Protolloydolithus is a genus of trinucleid trilobites found in Ordovician rocks in Gilwern Hill, Powys, Wales.

== Triassic animals ==
=== Aenigmaspina ===
Aenigmaspina (from Latin aenigma and spina, meaning "enigmatic spine") is an extinct genus of enigmatic pseudosuchian (=crurotarsan) archosaur from the Late Triassic of the United Kingdom. Its fossils are known from the Pant-y-ffynnon Quarry in South Wales, of which its type and only known species is named after, A. pantyffynnonensis.

=== Newtonsaurus ===
Newtonsaurus is an extinct genus of possibly coelophysoid theropod dinosaur from the Late Triassic (Rhaetian) Lilstock Formation of South Wales, Great Britain.The genus contains a single species, Newtonsaurus cambrensis, originally named as a species of Zanclodon, known from an external mould of the front half of a lower jaw.

=== Pantydraco ===
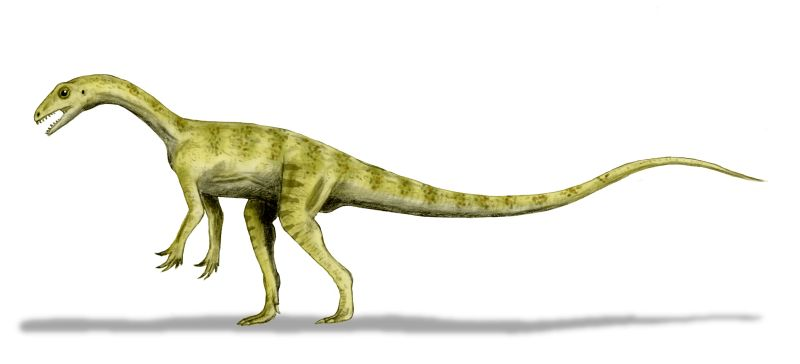
Pantydraco caducus

Pantydraco (where "panty-" is short for Pant-y-ffynnon, signifying hollow of the spring/well in Welsh, referring to the quarry at Bonvilston in South Wales where it was found) was a genus of basal sauropodomorph dinosaur from the Late Triassic of Wales. It is based on a partial juvenile skeleton once thought to belong to Thecodontosaurus. Only one valid species of Pantydraco is recognised: P. caducus.

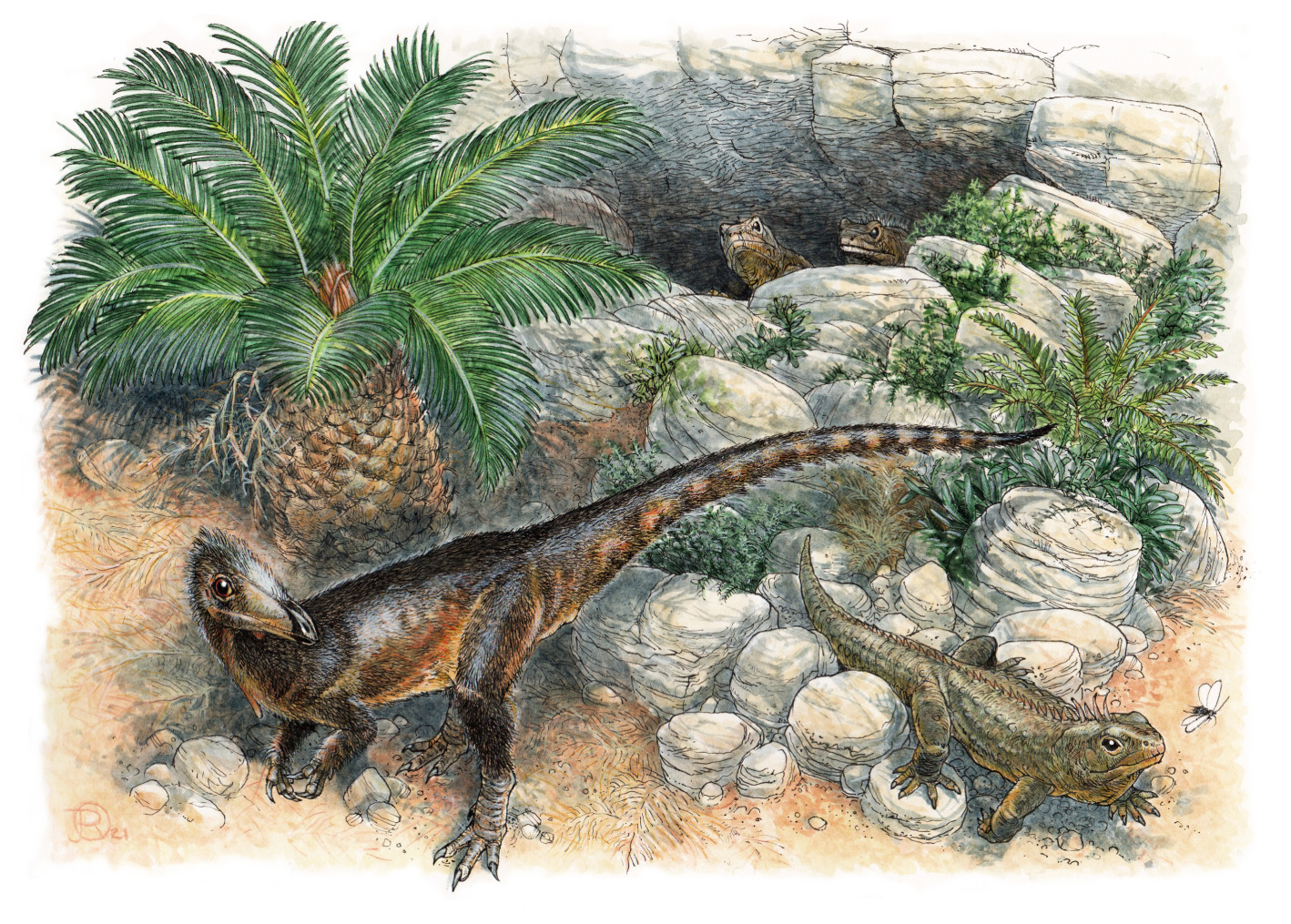
Life reconstruction of Pendraig milnerae

=== Pendraig ===
Pendraig (meaning "chief dragon" in Middle Welsh) is a genus of coelophysoid theropod dinosaur from South Wales. It contains one species, Pendraig milnerae, named after Angela Milner. The specimen was discovered in the Pant-y-Ffynnon quarry. In life it would have measured one metre in length.

== Jurassic Wales ==
=== Paceyodon ===
Paceyodon is an extinct genus of morganucodontan from Early Jurassic deposits of south Wales. Paceyodon is known from an isolated molariform that is significantly larger than any morganucodontan molariform yet discovered. It was collected in the Pant Quarry, Vale of Glamorgan. It was first named by William A. Clemens in 2011 and the type species is Paceyodon davidi.

=== Dracoraptor ===
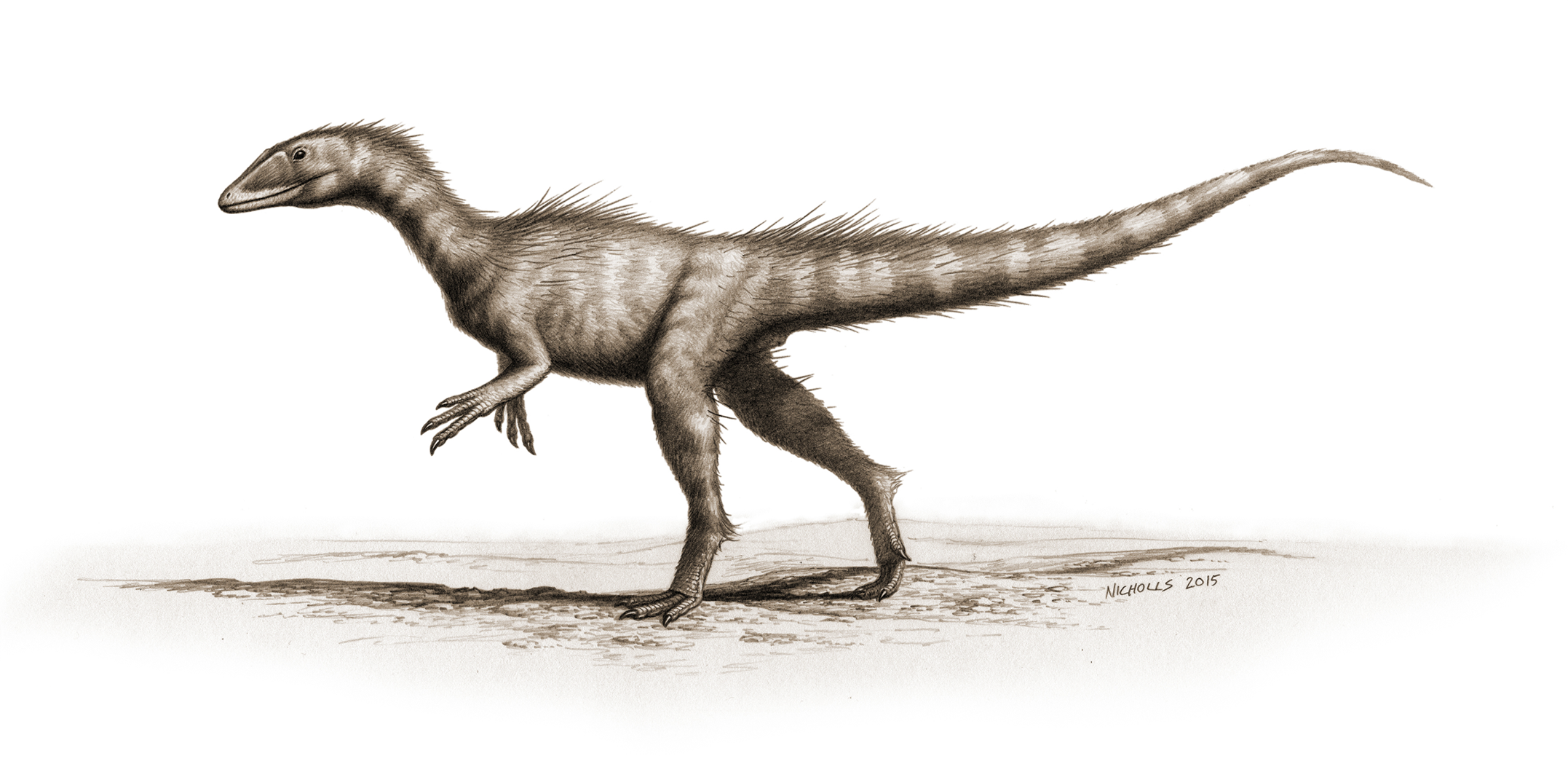
Dracoraptor hanigani

Dracoraptor (meaning "dragon thief") is a genus of coelophysoid dinosaur that lived during the Hettangian stage of the Early Jurassic Period of what is now Wales dated at 201.3 ± 0.2 million years old.

The fossil was first discovered in 2014 by Rob and Nick Hanigan and Sam Davies at the Blue Lias Formation on the South Wales coast. The genus name Dracoraptor is from Draco referring to the Welsh dragon and raptor, meaning robber, a commonly employed suffix for theropod dinosaurs with the type species being Dracoraptor hanigani. It is the oldest known Jurassic dinosaur and is the first dinosaur skeleton from the Jurassic of Wales.

== See also ==
- Geology of Wales
