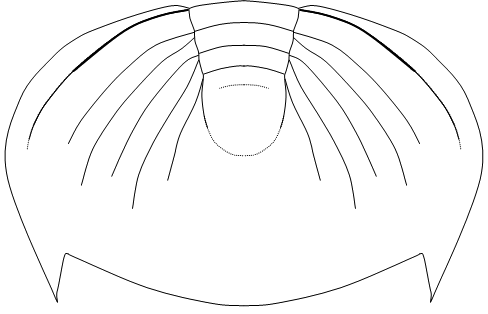
- drawing of a Dikelocephalus minnesotensis pygidium

Scientific classification
- Kingdom: Animalia
- Phylum: Arthropoda
- Clade: †Artiopoda
- Class: †Trilobita
- Order: †Asaphida
- Family: †Dikelocephalidae
- Genus: †Dikelocephalus; Owen, 1852

Species
- D. minnesotensis Owen, 1852 (type) = D. barretti, D. beani, D. brevis, D. declivis, D. edwardsi, D. gracilis, D. granosus, D. halli, D. hotchkissi, D. inaequalis, D. intermidius, D. juvinalis, D. marginatus, D. norwalkenis, D. orbiculatus, D. ovatus, D. oweni, D. postrectus, D. raaschi, D. regalis, D. retrorsus, D. subplanus, D. thwaitesi, D. weidmani, D. wiltonensis, D. winona, D. wisconsinensis, Dicellocephalus minnesotensis, Ogygia minnesotensis; D. freeburgensis Feniak, 1952

= Dikelocephalus =

Dikelocephalus Temporal range: Upper Cambrian

Genus of trilobites

Dikelocephalus is a genus of very large trilobites of up to 50 cm (20 in) long, that lived during the last 3 million years of the Cambrian (Sunwaptan). Their fossils are commonly found as disarticulated sclerites, in the upper Mississippi Valley (northeastern Iowa, southeastern Wisconsin, central to western Wisconsin) and in Canada (Alberta). The exoskeleton is rounded anteriorly, with the thorax and sides of the tailshield (or pygidium) slightly tapering to about 2/3× of the width across the base of the spines at the back of the headshield (or cephalon). At the side corners of the pygidium there may be triangular or hooked spines, pointing backwards, while between the spines the posterior margin is at a 30-75° angle with the lateral margin, gently convex or nearly straight. If pygidial spines are lacking, the margin is gradually rounded. The thorax has 12 segments.

== Distribution ==
The oldest known specimens of Dikelocephalus have been found in the upper part of the Tunnel City Group. Some of these early specimens, and only those, have been assigned to D. freeburgensis. These specimens may or may not be outside the wide morphological range of D. minnesotensis, but the analysis to establish this could not yet be done due to the absence of a sufficiently large collection from the collection site. Other specimen from the same deposit have confidently been assigned to D. minnesotensis however. D. minnesotensis also occurs in the Reno Member of the Lone Rock formation. The most common location of the species is the St. Laurence Formation, which directly overlies the deposits of the Tunnel City Group. The youngest known finds come from the Van Oser Member of the Jordan Formation, that in turn overlies the St. Laurence Formation.

== Description ==
Dikelocephalus is a very large trilobite (approximately 40 centimetres or 16 inches), slightly longer than wide (1 1/3×), widest across the base of the spines. The axis is less than half as wide as each of the pleural regions to its left and right. The headshield (or cephalon) and tailshield (or pygidium) are of approximately the same length (or isopygous). It is rather variable in many of its characters. The cephalon is rounded at its front and terminates in narrow, long spines that may reach the pygidium. The sides of the thorax and pygidium are tapering, with the width across the base of the pygidial spines about 2/3 of the width across the base of the genal spines. The cephalon may be covered in pustules in small specimens, but pustules get wider spaced and lower with size. central raised area of the cephalon (or glabella) is crossed by two furrows, the most backward almost straight defining the occipital ring, and the frontal one convex towards the back. There may be two further pairs of furrows, but these are not connected across the midline, the frontal pair directed outward and backward, and the second pair from the front outward. The occipital ring has a transverse ridge just in front of its back margin, and may have a tubercle in its middle. The front of the glabella is bluntly rounded, and the anterior glabellar furrow is shallow. The area in front of the glabella is flat or slightly downsloping, 1/2-1/3 als long as the glabella. Border variously developed, short and low, with two to five slightly so-called terrace lines. Eyes lunar shaped, 1/3-1/4 as long as the glabella, back perpendicular to the front of the occipital ring, midlength about as far from the glabella as the occipital ring is long. From the front of the eye the facial suture is directed forward and outward at ±30°, only to curve abruptly forward and inward at the border furrow, crossing the margin at a variable location but not directly in front of the glabella. From the back of the eye the facial suture curves abruptly outward, to curve abruptly backward at halfwidth of the area outside the glabella (the cheek or gena). The rim of the hard exoskeleton tucked under at the ventral side of the cephalon (or doublure), is extremely wide, nearly reaching the ventral side of the eye, and has about 17 terrace lines. The palate (or hypostome) is attached to the anterior doublure, rectangular, wider than long, with tooth-like extensions where the hypostome meets the inner margin of the doublure and with a concave posterior margin. The few complete specimens that have been found have12 thorax segments. A postule in the middle of each axial ring may be present. Frontal margin perpendicular to the midline, but gradually curling backward further out. Tip blunt in frontal segments, ending in a short backward pointing spine for rear segments. Pygidium transversely elliptical with two triangular or inwardly curving spines. Axis 1/2-7/8× as long as the pygidium, with 4-5 rings and a terminal piece.

=== Growth ===
In Dikelocephalus allometric growth has been found for a number of characters. The glabella becomes relatively wider with size and in small specimens the glabella has small raised protrusions (or pustules), that become further spaced and lower with size, to become indiscernible in specimens over 10 cm. The relative length of the eye lobe decreases during ontogeny, although only slightly in larger specimens. Also the length of the pygidium (including the spines) relative to the pygidial axis reduces with size.

== Taxonomy ==
Early analysis of the large morphological diversity in Dikelocephalus resulted in splitting up the genus into many "species" during the first half of the 20th century. After applying modern analysis methods like multivariate analysis, including principal component analysis and nonmetric multidimensional scaling at the end of the 20th century, it turned out the variation was continuous, and all specimens belonged to the same morphospecies. This results in a large number of synonyms for D. minnesotensis (see box). The only other putative species may be D. freeburgensis. The large variation in morphological characters in this early trilobite can be seen as an illustration of Rosa's Rule.

=== Reassigned species ===
The genus Dikelocephalus was established relatively early on, and as a consequence many species have since been reassigned to other genera.

- D. iowensis = Crepicephalus iowensis
- D. vanhornei = Walcottaspis vanhornei
- D. corax = Bienvillia corax
- D. bröggeri = Tropidopyge broeggeri
- D. roemeri = Elvinia roemeri
- D. pepinensis = Saukiella pepinensis
- D. crassimarginatus = Tellerina crassimarginatus
- D. megalops = Richardsonella megalops
- D. planifrons = Lauzonella planifrons
- D. magnificus = Hungaia magnifica
- D. sesostris = Pseudosaukia sesostris

== Ecology ==
Dikelocephalus lived in shelf seas, in particular sandy or chalky areas of the inner shelf.
