= Sella Formation =

Geologic formation of southern Bolivia

- Stratigraphic range: Dapingian-Darriwilian; ~478–450 Ma
- Type: Geological formation

Lithology
- Primary: Siltstone, sandstone
- Other: Shale, limestone, coquina

Location
- Coordinates: 21.4°S 64.6°W
- Approximate paleocoordinates: 42.8°S 131.6°W
- Region: Tarija Department
- Country: Bolivia
- Sella Formation (Bolivia)

The Sella Formation is a Dapingian to Darriwilian geologic formation of southern Bolivia. The grey to green bioturbated siltstones interbedded with thin sandstone layers bear lenticular shell beds. Other parts of the formation contain yellow-green limy shales and grey sandy limestones. Coquinas often fill gutter casts and included brachiopods, trilobites, bivalves and nautiloids. The sediments were deposited in an open marine environment. The species Coxiconchia sellaensis was named after the formation.

== Fossil content ==
The formation has provided the following fossils:

- Baltograptus minutus
- Coxiconchia sellaensis
- Desmorthis segnis
- Glyptorthis imbrex
- Hemiprionodonta lusitanica
- Lingulocystis boliviensis
- Natasia boliviensis
- Pliomeridius sulcatus
- Redonia riojana
- Ribeiria spinosa
- Peelerophon cf. oehlerti
- Ampyx sp.
- Boeckaspis sp.
- Branisaspis sp.
- Bucania sp.
- Colpocoryphe sp.
- Cosmogoniophorina sp.
- Ctenodonta sp.
- Cyptendoceras sp.
- Didymograptus sp.
- Endoceras sp.
- Eothinoceras sp.
- Famatinolithus sp.
- Haploprimitia sp.
- Hoekaspis sp.
- Lecanospira sp.
- Lonchodomas sp.
- Maclurites sp.
- Quadrilobella sp.
- Parapyxion sp.
- Protocycloceras sp.
- Sibiritella sp.
- Suriaspis sp.
- Synhomalonotus sp.
- Technophorus sp.
- Trinucleus sp.

== See also ==
- List of fossiliferous stratigraphic units in Bolivia
