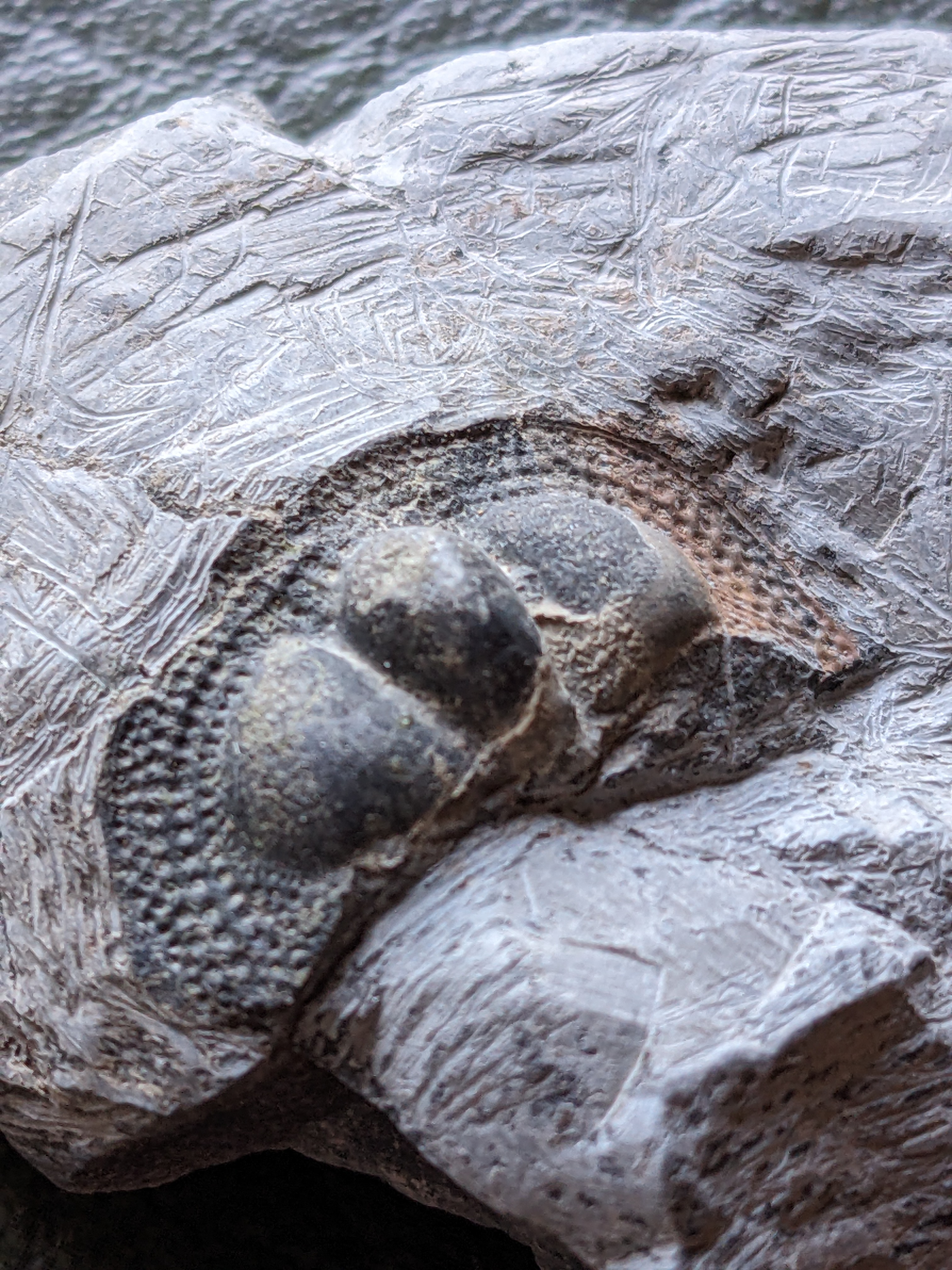
- Salterolithus caractaci

Scientific classification
- Kingdom: Animalia
- Phylum: Arthropoda
- Clade: †Artiopoda
- Class: †Trilobita
- Order: †Asaphida
- Family: †Trinucleidae
- Genus: †Salterolithus; Bancroft, 1929

= Salterolithus =

Salterolithus Temporal range: 448–458 Ma

Extinct genus of trilobites

Salterolithus is a genus of trilobites of the order Asaphida. It is in the family Trinucleidae and was named after British geologist J.W. Salter.

Fossil specimens have been found in the Upper Ordovician rocks of Wales and central England.

This trilobite was blind but anatomical evidence suggests it sifted organic matter on the seabed.
