= Taebaeksaukia =

Taebaeksaukia Temporal range: Furongian

Scientific classification
- Kingdom: Animalia
- Phylum: Arthropoda
- Clade: †Artiopoda
- Class: †Trilobita
- Order: †Asaphida
- Family: †Dikelocephalidae
- Genus: †Taebaeksaukia; Lee & Choi, 2011
- Species: †T. spinata

Binomial name
- †Taebaeksaukia spinata Lee & Choi, 2011

Genus of trilobites

Taebaeksaukia spinata is a species of trilobites in the family Dikelocephalidae, which existed in what is now Korea during the upper Furongian period. It was described in 2011, and is the only species in the genus Taebaeksaukia.
