= Bumastides =

Bumastides Temporal range: Arenig

Scientific classification
- Kingdom: Animalia
- Phylum: Arthropoda
- Clade: †Artiopoda
- Class: †Trilobita
- Order: †Asaphida
- Family: †Nileidae
- Genus: †Bumastides; Veber, 1948

Bumastides is an extinct genus from a well-known class of fossil marine arthropods, the trilobites. It lived during the Arenig stage of the Ordovician Period, approximately 478 to 471 million years ago.
