= Haniwa (trilobite) =

Haniwa Temporal range: Furongian–Tremadocian

Scientific classification
- Kingdom: Animalia
- Phylum: Arthropoda
- Clade: †Artiopoda
- Class: †Trilobita
- Order: †Asaphida
- Family: †Remopleurididae
- Genus: †Haniwa; Kobayashi, 1933

Species
- Haniwa elongata Qian, 1985; Haniwa quadrata Kobayashi, 1933; Haniwa sosanensis Kobayashi, 1933

Extinct genus of remopleuridid trilobite

Haniwa is an extinct genus of remopleuridid trilobite that lived during the Furongian epoch of the Cambrian period and the Tremadocian stage of the Ordovician.

== Description ==
Haniwa quadrata lacked a globular morphology of asaphoid protaspis, as was typical for members of the remopleuridioid superfamily. Its free cheeks were yoked together throughout the course of ontogenetic development.
