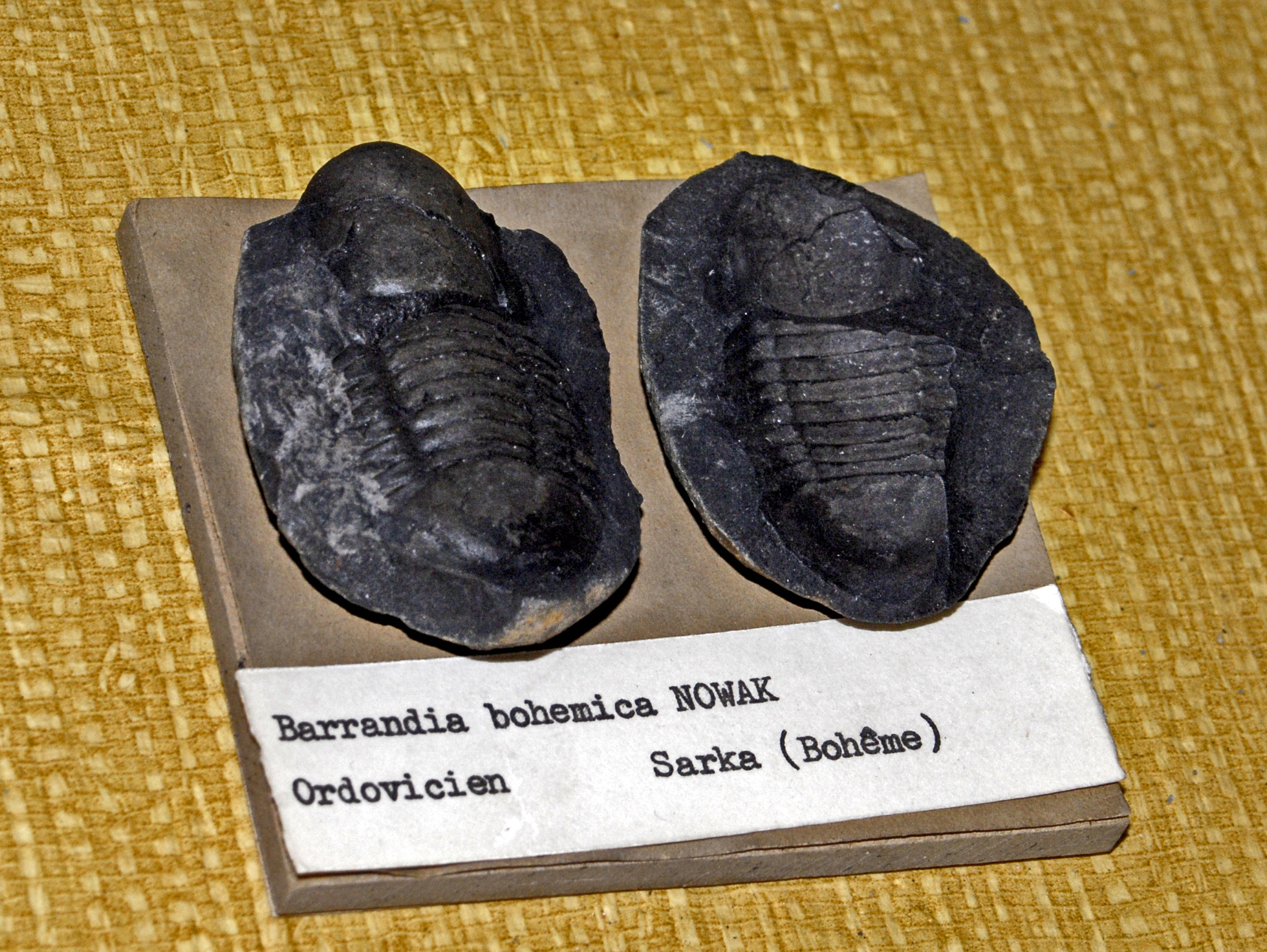
- P. bohemica from Bohemia

Scientific classification
- Kingdom: Animalia
- Phylum: Arthropoda
- Clade: †Artiopoda
- Class: †Trilobita
- Order: †Asaphida
- Family: †Nileidae
- Genus: †Parabarrandia; Prantl & Pribyl, 1949

Synonyms
- Barrandia bohemica Novak, 1884

= Parabarrandia =

Parabarrandia Temporal range: Ordovician

Extinct genus of trilobites

Parabarrandia is a genus of trilobite of the Asaphida order. These fast-moving nektonic carnivores lived in the Ordovician period.

== Species ==
- Parabarrandia bohemica (Novák, 1884)
