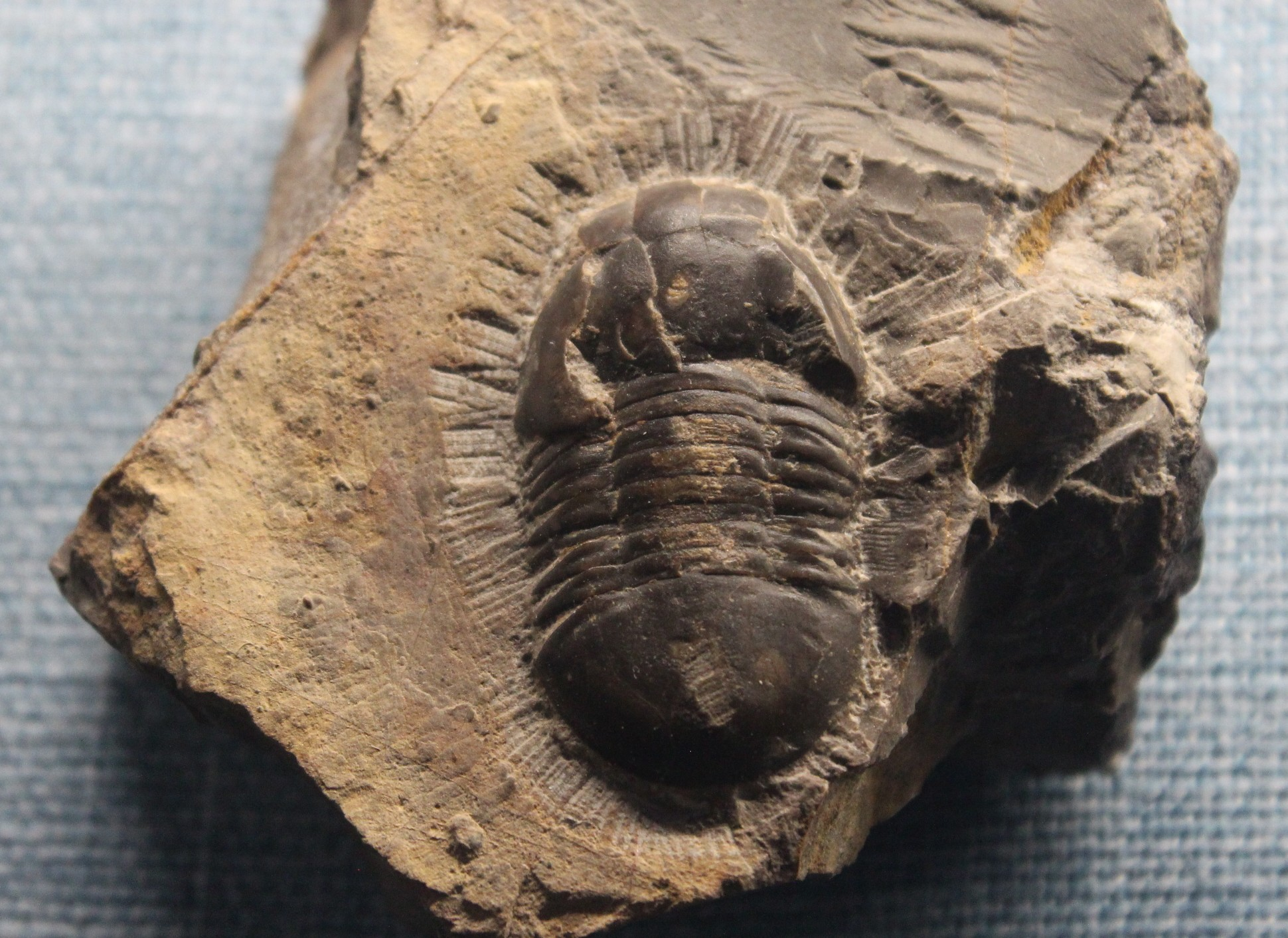
- Fossil specimen, Baoding Natural History Museum

Scientific classification
- Kingdom: Animalia
- Phylum: Arthropoda
- Clade: †Artiopoda
- Class: †Trilobita
- Order: †Asaphida
- Family: †Nileidae
- Genus: †Symphysurus; Goldfuss, 1843

= Symphysurus =

Symphysurus Temporal range: Ordovician

Extinct genus of trilobites

Symphysurus is a genus of trilobite of the Asaphida order. These fast-moving nektonic carnivores lived in the Ordovician period
