= Elkia =

Scientific classification
- Domain: Eukaryota
- Kingdom: Animalia
- Phylum: Arthropoda
- Class: †Trilobita
- Order: †Asaphida
- Family: †Dikelocephalidae
- Genus: †Elkia; Walcott, 1924

Extinct genus of trilobites

Elkia is an extinct genus of trilobite in the order Asaphida.
