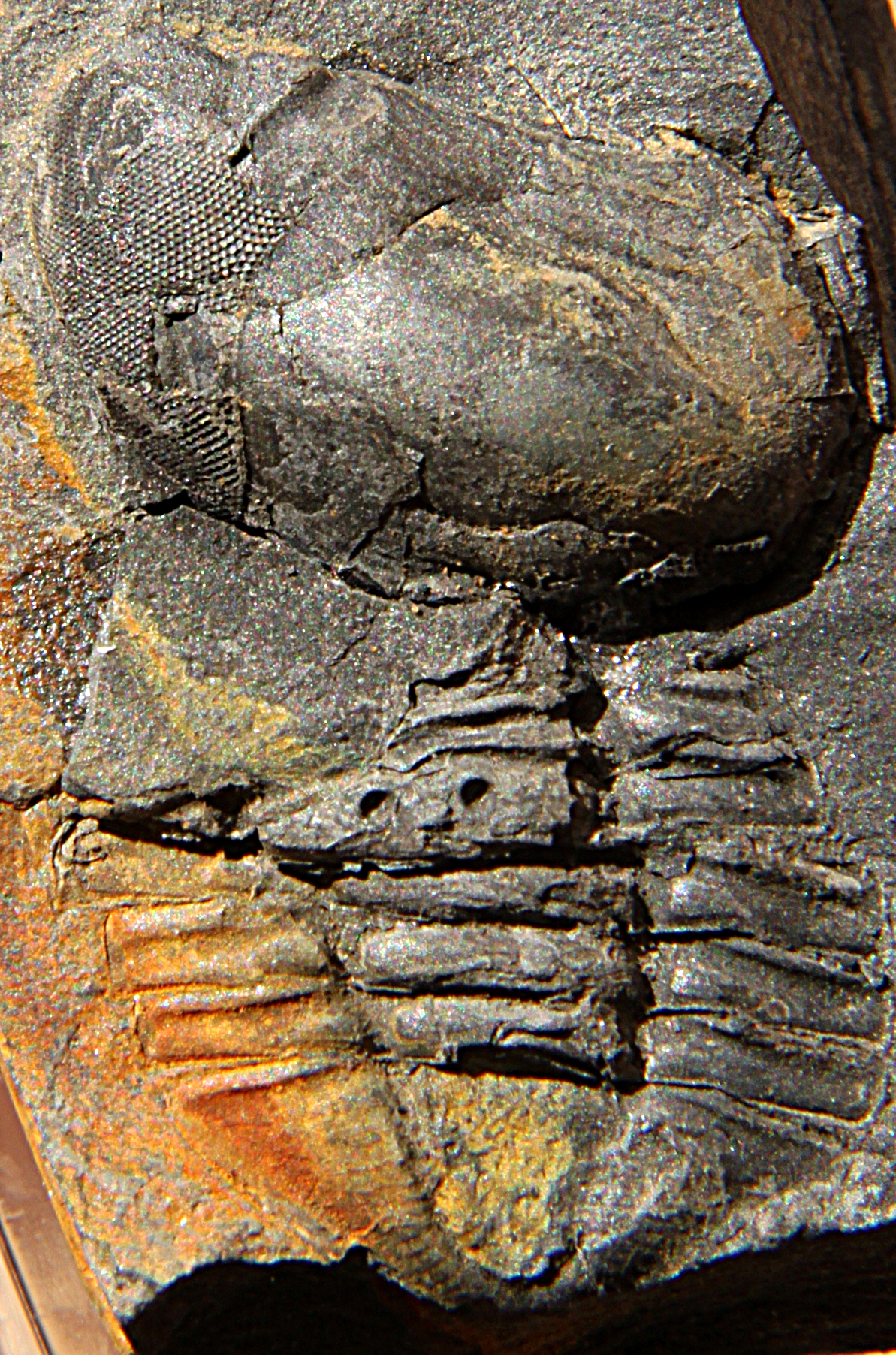
- Pricyclopyge binodosa

Scientific classification
- Kingdom: Animalia
- Phylum: Arthropoda
- Clade: †Artiopoda
- Class: †Trilobita
- Order: †Asaphida
- Superfamily: †Cyclopygoidea; Raymond, 1925

= Cyclopygoidea =

Cyclopygoidea Temporal range: Furongian–Ordovician

Extinct superfamily of Trilobites

Cyclopygoidea is a superfamily of trilobites in the order Asaphida, containing the families Cyclopygidae, Nileidae, Symphysurinidae, and Taihungshaniidae. Some subgroups such as the Cyclopygidae are thought to have lived in the water column in the deep sea, where as the unrelated telephinids such as Carolinites inhabited epipelagic depths around the same time. Some members of the family Nileidae were moved outside of it. The first cyclopygoids were of the family Simphysurinidae such as Symphysurina in Furongian (late Cambrian) North America.
