= Deanaspis =

Deanaspis Temporal range: 445–461 Ma

Scientific classification
- Domain: Eukaryota
- Kingdom: Animalia
- Phylum: Arthropoda
- Class: †Trilobita
- Order: †Asaphida
- Family: †Trinucleidae
- Genus: †Deanaspis; Hughes, Ingham & Addison, 1975

Extinct genus of trilobites

Deanaspis is a genus of asaphid trilobites in the family Trinucleidae in the Ordovician periods. It is reported only from Northern Europe and Iran. It was named as a new genus in 1975.

In 2025, a member of the Galeaspida was given the same genus name ("Deanaspis" longpingi), with a replacement name yet to be chosen.
