= Gymnostomix =

Gymnostomix Temporal range: Early Arenig

Scientific classification
- Domain: Eukaryota
- Kingdom: Animalia
- Phylum: Arthropoda
- Class: †Trilobita
- Order: †Asaphida
- Family: †Trinucleidae
- Genus: †Gymnostomix; Fortey & Owens, 1987

Extinct genus of trilobites

Gymnostomix is an extinct genus of trilobites in the family Trinucleidae. The genus lived during the early part of the Arenig stage of the Ordovician Period, a faunal stage which lasted from approximately 478 to 471 million years ago.
