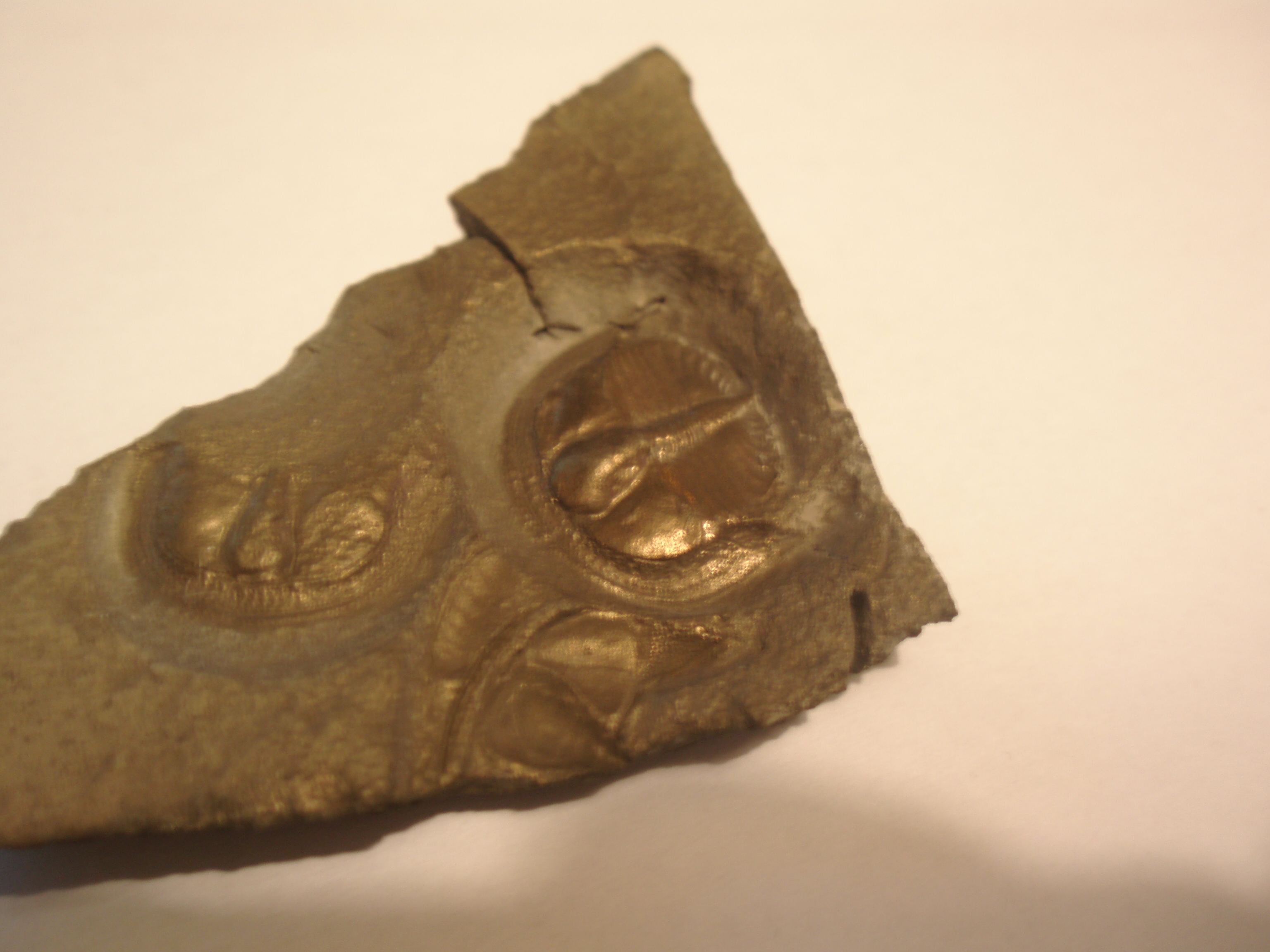
- L. lloydi

Scientific classification
- Domain: Eukaryota
- Kingdom: Animalia
- Phylum: Arthropoda
- Class: †Trilobita
- Order: †Asaphida
- Family: †Trinucleidae
- Genus: †Lloydolithus; Bancroft 1933

= Lloydolithus =

Lloydolithus Temporal range: Late Ordovician

Extinct genus of trilobites

Lloydolithus is a genus of Asaphid trilobite from the Late Ordovician of Wales.
