= Costonia =

Scientific classification
- Domain: Eukaryota
- Kingdom: Animalia
- Phylum: Arthropoda
- Class: †Trilobita
- Order: †Asaphida
- Family: †Trinucleidae
- Genus: †Costonia; Whittard, 1956

Species
- C. elegans Dean, 1960; C. ultima Bancroft, 1949

Extinct genus of trilobites

Costonia is a genus of trilobites in the family Trinucleidae. The species C. elegans is from the Ordovician of South Shropshire, England.

== See also ==
- List of trilobite genera
