= Meadowtownella =

Scientific classification
- Kingdom: Animalia
- Phylum: Arthropoda
- Clade: †Artiopoda
- Class: †Trilobita
- Order: †Odontopleurida
- Family: †Odontopleuridae
- Genus: †Meadowtownella; Pribyl & Vanek, 1965

Diversity
- 19 species

Extinct genus of trilobites

Meadowtownella is a genus of odontopleurid trilobite that lived during the Ordovician period in a wide range being found in the United States, Canada, Sweden, Norway, Scotland, Wales, England, Latvia and Portugal.

== Taxonomy ==
This genus was described in 1965 by Pribyl and Vanek. The genus currently contains around 20 described species. They are listed below:

Species	Authority	Occurrence	Age	Refs
M. ascitus	Whittington, 1956	United States	Caradoc (Sandbian)	
M. bestorpensis	Bruton (1966)	Sweden	Caradoc—Ashgill (Katian)	
M. bucculenta	McNamara (1979)	England, Norway	Ashgill (Katian)	
M. caractaci	Salter (1853), Dean (1963)	England, Ireland	Late Caradoc (Katian)	
M. crosotus	Locke (1843)	United States	Late Caradoc (Katian)	
M. evoluta	Törnquist (1884), Bruton (1966)	Sweden, Norway, Wales, England, Latvia	Ashgill (Katian)	
M. girvanesis	Reed (1914)	Scotland	Ashgill (Katian–Hirnatian)	
M. harnagensis	Bancroft (1949), Dean (1963)	England	Early Caradoc (Sandbian)	
M. horani	Billings (1863)	?	Early Caradoc (Sandbian)	
M. llandowrensis	Price (1980)	Southern Wales	Ashgill (Katian)	
M. mendica	Siveter (1989)	Ireland	Silurian (Wenlock)	
M. multispinosa	Bruton (1965), Hansen (2009)	Norway	Late Llanvirn (Darriwilian)	
M. rorringtonensis	Whittard (1961)	Shelve Inlier, Wales	Caradoc (Katian)	
M. sacerdos	Lespérance (1998)	Quebec	Late Ashgill (Katian–Hirnantian)	
M. semievoluta	Reed (1910), Dean (1962)	England	Caradoc (Sandbian)	
M. serrata	Conway & Botting, 2011	Mid-Wales	Middle Ordovician (Llanvirn)	
M. simulatrix	Whittard (1961)	Shelve Inlier, Wales	Late Llanvirn (Darriwilian)	
M. trentonensis	Hall (1847), Brett et al. (1999)	United States	Late Caradoc (Katian)	
M. whitei	Whittard (1961)	Shelve Inlier, Wales	Late Llanvirn (Darriwilian)	
M. yunnanensis	Wei, X., Zhan, R., Yan, G., Zhang, X., & Wang, G., 2025	South China	End-Ordovician	

== Distribution ==
Some species have been found in Gilwern Hill in Wales, but tend only to be found in the lower portions of the Kope Formation in Ohio. They can also found in Trenton Group rock units in New York State, Ontario and Quebec. South China during the during the recovery from the Late Ordovician mass extinction was host to many endemic species and genera of trilobites such as Meadowtownella yunnanensis.

== Description ==
It is similar to Acidaspis cincinnatiensis but without the occipital spine.
