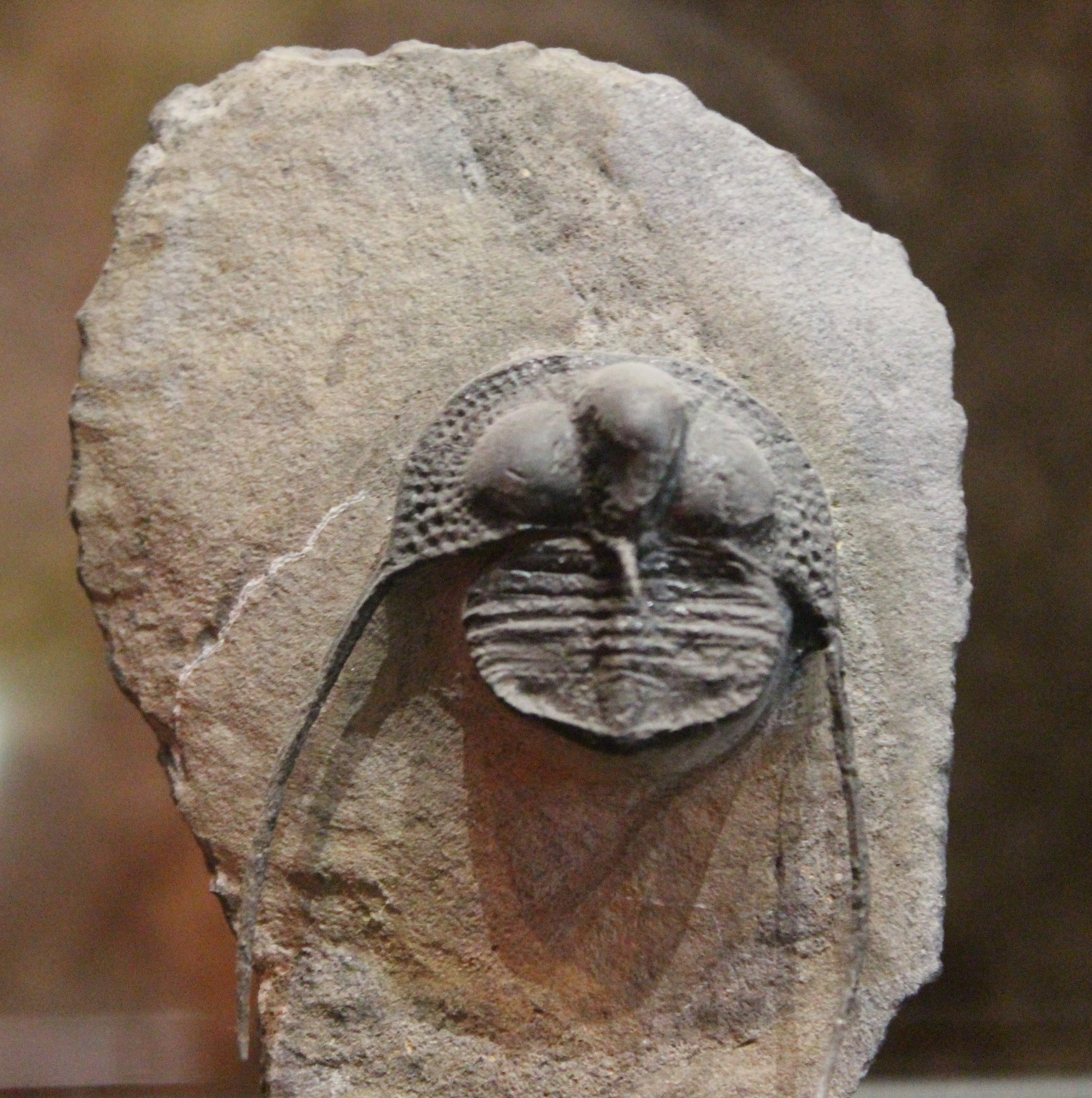
- Cryptolithus fossil, National Museum of Natural History
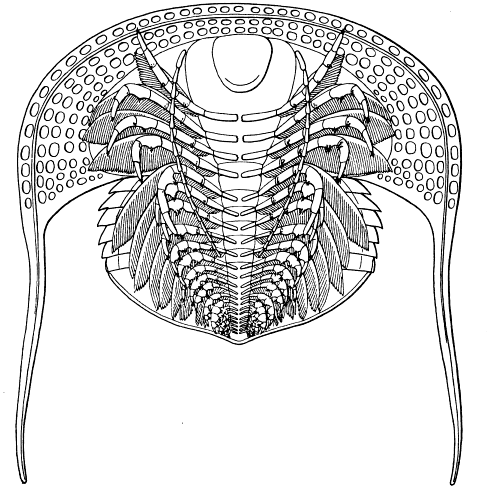
- Reconstruction of the ventral side of Cryptolithus tessellatus

Scientific classification
- Domain: Eukaryota
- Kingdom: Animalia
- Phylum: Arthropoda
- Class: †Trilobita
- Order: †Asaphida
- Family: †Trinucleidae
- Genus: †Cryptolithus; Green, 1832

= Cryptolithus =

Cryptolithus Temporal range: Ordovician

Extinct genus of trilobites

Cryptolithus is a genus of extinct epifaunal, suspension-feeding, trinucleid trilobites that lived during the Ordovician period. They were mostly blind. They are found in the United States, Canada, Venezuela, the United Kingdom, France, the Czech Republic, Morocco and Turkey.

== Species ==
Valid species of Cryptolithus include:

- Cryptolithus bellulus (Ulrich, 1879)
- Cryptolithus carimatus
- Cryptolithus fittsi (Ulrich & Whittington)
- Cryptolithus goldfussi (Barrande)
- Cryptolithus inopinatus (Whittard)
- Cryptolithus intertetus (Whittard)
- Cryptolithus lorerainensis (Ruedemann)
- Cryptolithus lorettensis (Foerste, 1924)
- Cryptolithus ornatus (Sternberg)
- Cryptolithus portlockii
  - Cryptolithus portlockii girvanensis
- Cryptolithus quadrillatus
- Cryptolithus recurvus (Ulrich, 1919)
- Cryptolithus tessellatus (Green, 1832)
- Cryptolithus ultimus (Barrande)
