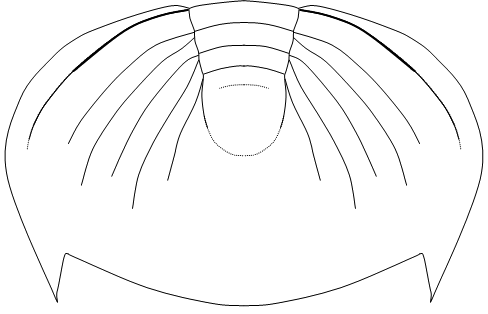
- A drawing of the pygidium of Dikelocephalus minnesotensis, Order Asaphida, family Dikelocephalidae, final stage of the Upper Cambrian

Scientific classification
- Kingdom: Animalia
- Phylum: Arthropoda
- Clade: †Artiopoda
- Class: †Trilobita
- Order: †Asaphida
- Superfamily: †Dikelocephaloidea
- Family: †Dikelocephalidae; Miller, 1889

= Dikelocephalidae =

Family of trilobites

Dikelocephalidae is a family of trilobites, that lived during the Upper Cambrian. Relatively large eyes close to the glabella, is a shared characteristic. The following genera have been assigned to this family:

- Berkeia
- Blandicephalus
- Briscoia
- Camaraspoides
- Dikelocephalus
- Elkia
- Goumenzia
- Hoytaspis
- Iranella
- Kasachstanaspis
- Monocheilus
- Olimus
- Osceolia
- Parabriscoia
- Patalolaspis
- Princetonella
- Pterocephalops
- Randicephalus
- Stigmacephalus
- Taebaeksaukia
- Walcottaspis
