= Ptychaspididae =

Scientific classification
- Kingdom: Animalia
- Phylum: Arthropoda
- Clade: †Artiopoda
- Class: †Trilobita
- Order: †Asaphida
- Superfamily: †Dikelocephaloidea
- Family: †Ptychaspididae; Raymond, 1924

Genera
- See text

Extinct family of trilobites

Ptychaspididae is a family of trilobites, containing the following genera:

- Alborsella
- Changia
- Eoptychaspis
- Eowuhuia
- Euptychaspis
- Idiomesus
- Kathleenella
- Keithia
- Keithiella
- Macronoda
- Plectrella
- Proricephalus
- Ptychaspis
- Saukioides
- Sunwaptia
- Wilcoxaspis
