= Broeggerolithus =

Broeggerolithus Temporal range: 450–458 Ma

Scientific classification
- Kingdom: Animalia
- Phylum: Arthropoda
- Clade: †Artiopoda
- Class: †Trilobita
- Order: †Asaphida
- Family: †Trinucleidae
- Genus: †Broeggerolithus; Bancroft, 1935

Extinct genus of trilobites

Broeggerolithus is a genus of the family Trinucleidae in the Ordovician periods. It is reported only from Northern Europe.
