= Marrolithus =

Marrolithus Temporal range: Ordovician

Scientific classification
- Kingdom: Animalia
- Phylum: Arthropoda
- Clade: †Artiopoda
- Class: †Trilobita
- Order: †Asaphida
- Family: †Trinucleidae
- Genus: †Marrolithus; Bancroft, 1929

Species
- Marrolithus bureaui Oehlert, 1895 Marrolithus orthogonius Dean, 1967

Extinct genus of trinucleid trilobite

Marrolithus is an extinct genus of trinucleid trilobite that lived during the Ordovician period.

== Palaeobiology ==
=== Ontogeny ===
During the meraspid period of ontogeny, the glabella of Marrolithus bureaui became compressed. During this ontogenetic stage, the species also developed a pronounced sub-quadrangular cephalic outline. The alae disappeared later on in development.
