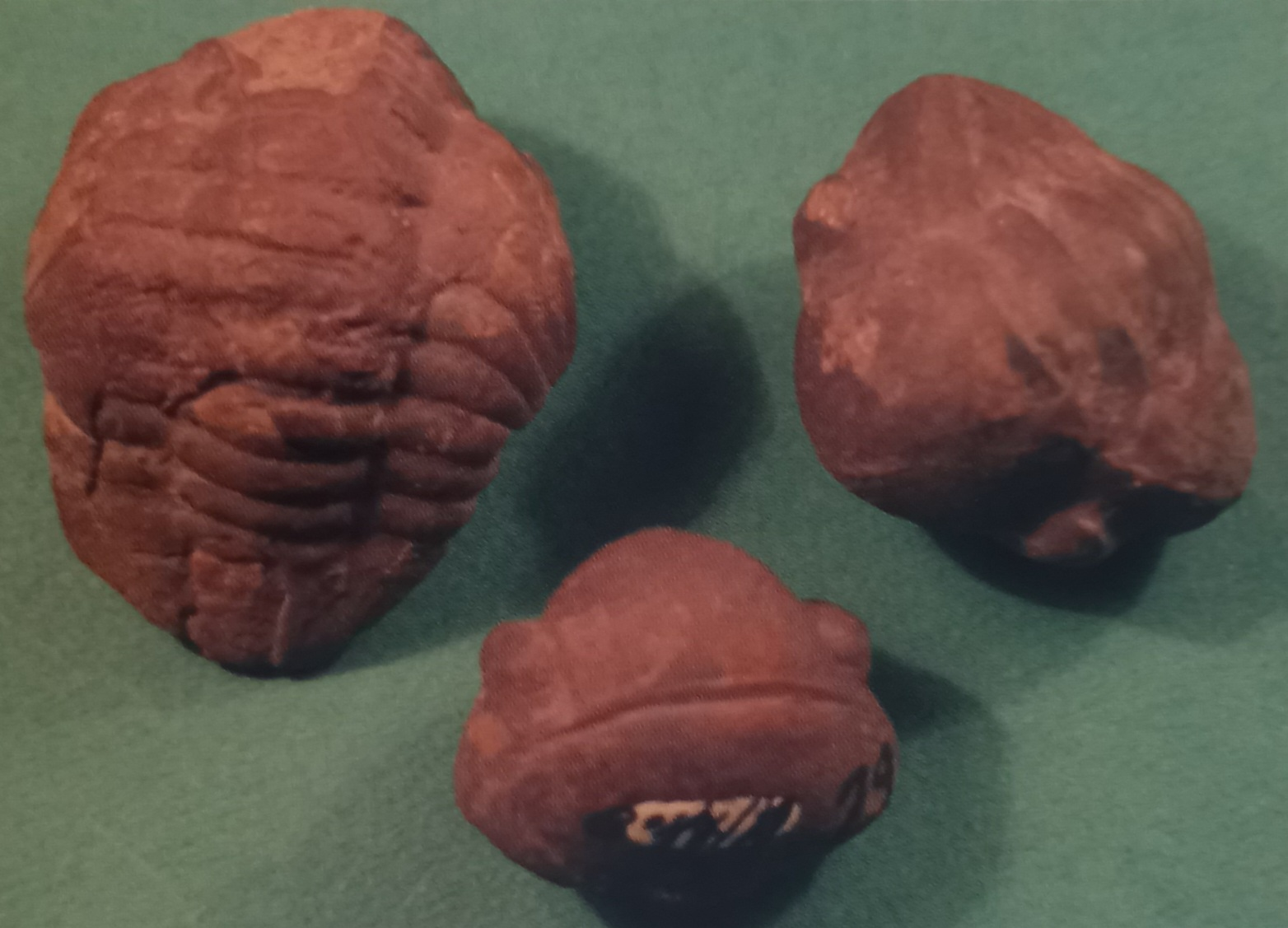
- Symphysurus from Iran, Ordovician
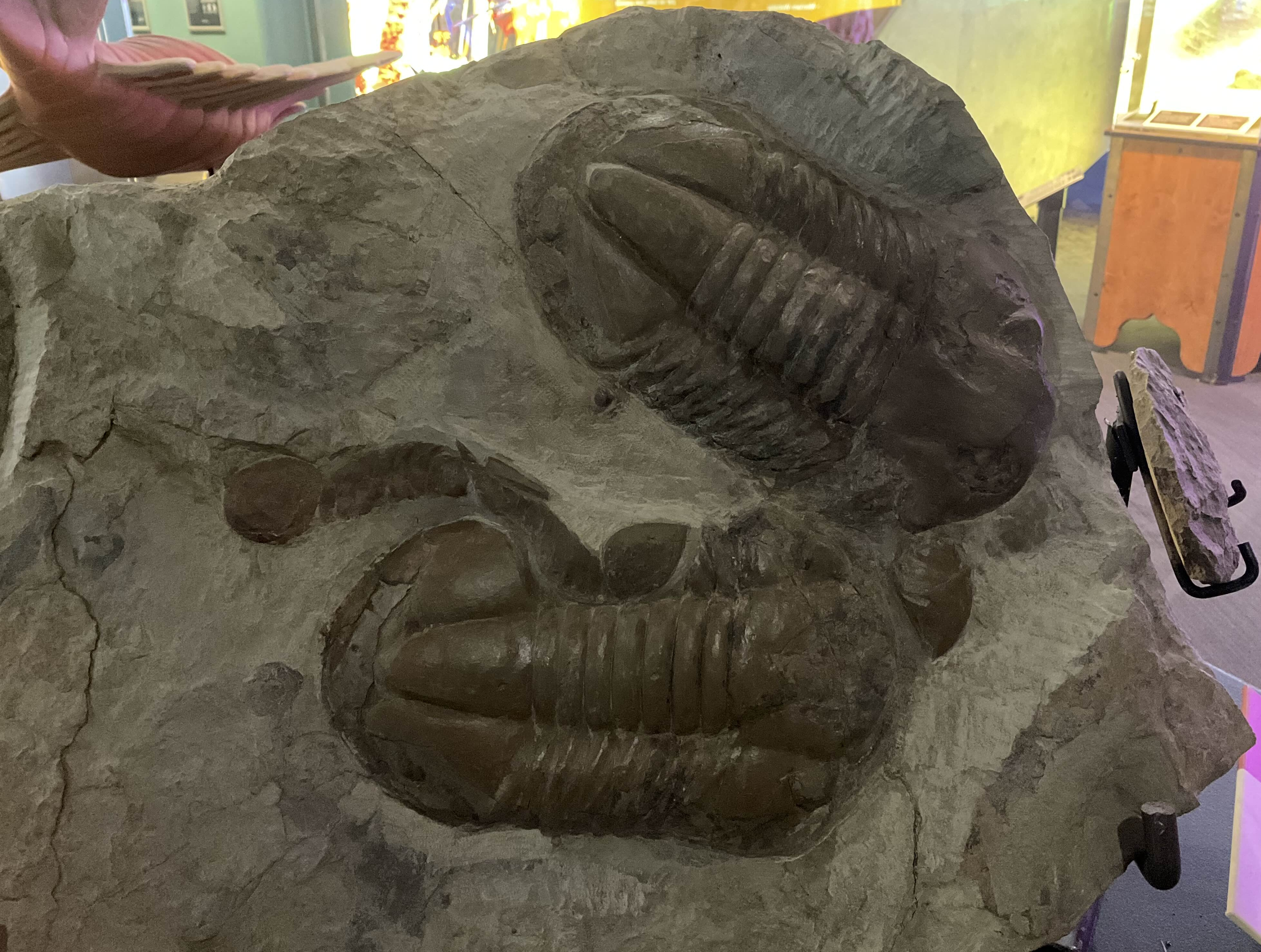
- Platypeltoides magrebiensis and aglaspidid from early Ordovician Fezouata Formation, Morocco

Scientific classification
- Kingdom: Animalia
- Phylum: Arthropoda
- Clade: †Artiopoda
- Class: †Trilobita
- Order: †Asaphida
- Superfamily: †Cyclopygoidea
- Family: †Nileidae; Angelin, 1854

Genera
- See text

= Nileidae =

Nileidae Temporal range: Cambrian to Ordovician

Extinct family of trilobites

Nileidae is a family of trilobites of the Asaphida order.

These fast-moving nektonic carnivores lived in the Ordovician and Cambrian periods.

== Genera ==
- Aocaspis Dolambi and Gond 1992
- Barrandia McCoy 1849
- Borthaspidella Rasetti 1954
- Bumastides Veber 1948
- Homalopteon Salter 1867
- Illaenopsis Salter 1865
- Kodymaspis Prantl and Pribyl 1950
- Neopsilocephalina Yin 1978
- Nileus Dalman 1827
- Parabarrandia Prantl and Pribyl 1949
- Peraspis Whittington 1965
- Petrbokia Pribyl and Vanek 1965
- Platypeltoides Pribyl 1949
- Poronileus Fortey 1975
- Psilocephalinella Kobayashi 1951
- Symphysurina Ulrich 1924
- Symphysurus Goldfuss 1843
- Varvia Thernvik 1965
