= Myttonia =

Myttonia Temporal range: Early Arenig

Scientific classification
- Domain: Eukaryota
- Kingdom: Animalia
- Phylum: Arthropoda
- Class: †Trilobita
- Order: †Asaphida
- Family: †Trinucleidae
- Genus: †Myttonia; Whittard, 1955

Extinct genus of trilobites

Myttonia is an extinct genus of trilobites in the family Trinucleidae. The genus lived during the early part of the Arenig stage of the Ordovician Period, a faunal stage which lasted from approximately 478 to 471 million years ago.
