= Lordshillia =

Lordshillia Temporal range: Early Arenig

Scientific classification
- Domain: Eukaryota
- Kingdom: Animalia
- Phylum: Arthropoda
- Class: †Trilobita
- Order: †Asaphida
- Family: †Trinucleidae
- Genus: †Lordshillia; Whittard, 1966

Extinct genus of trilobites

Lordshillia is an extinct genus of trilobites in the family Trinucleidae. The genus lived during the early part of the Arenig stage of the Ordovician Period, a faunal stage which lasted from approximately 478 to 471 million years ago.
