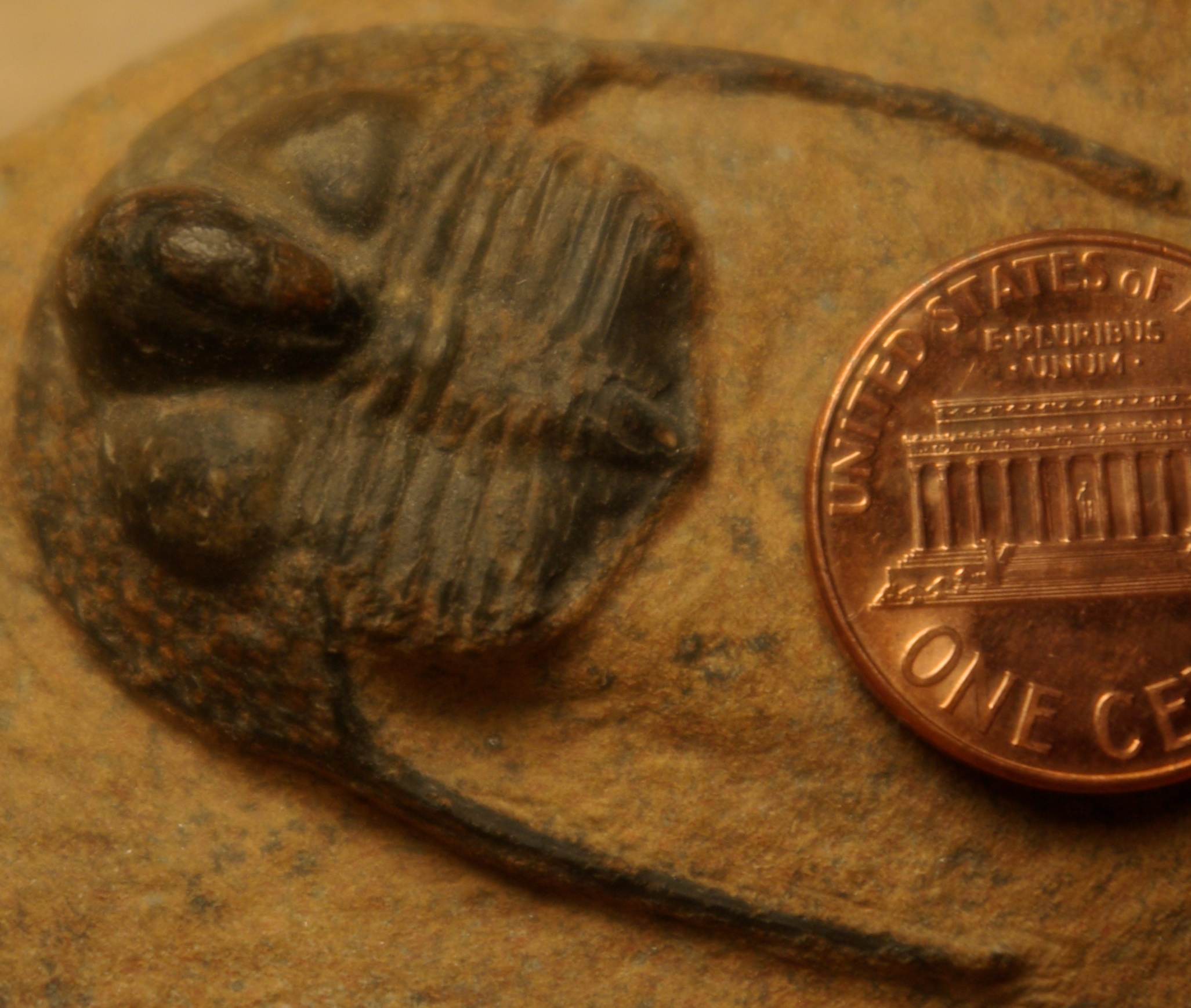
- Onnia seunesi, Ordovician, Morocco

Scientific classification
- Kingdom: Animalia
- Phylum: Arthropoda
- Clade: †Artiopoda
- Class: †Trilobita
- Order: †Asaphida
- Family: †Trinucleidae
- Genus: †Onnia; Bancroft, 1933

Species
- Onnia cobboldi; Onnia goldfussi; Onnia gracilis; Onnia seunesi; Onnia superba; Onnia vysocanensis

= Onnia (trilobite) =

Onnia Temporal range: late Ordovician 461–443 Ma

Genus of trilobites

Onnia is a genus of trilobites from the late Ordovician of Africa, Europe, North America, and South America. Fossils have been found in Canada (Quebec), the Czech Republic, France, Morocco, Portugal, Spain, the United Kingdom, and Venezuela.
