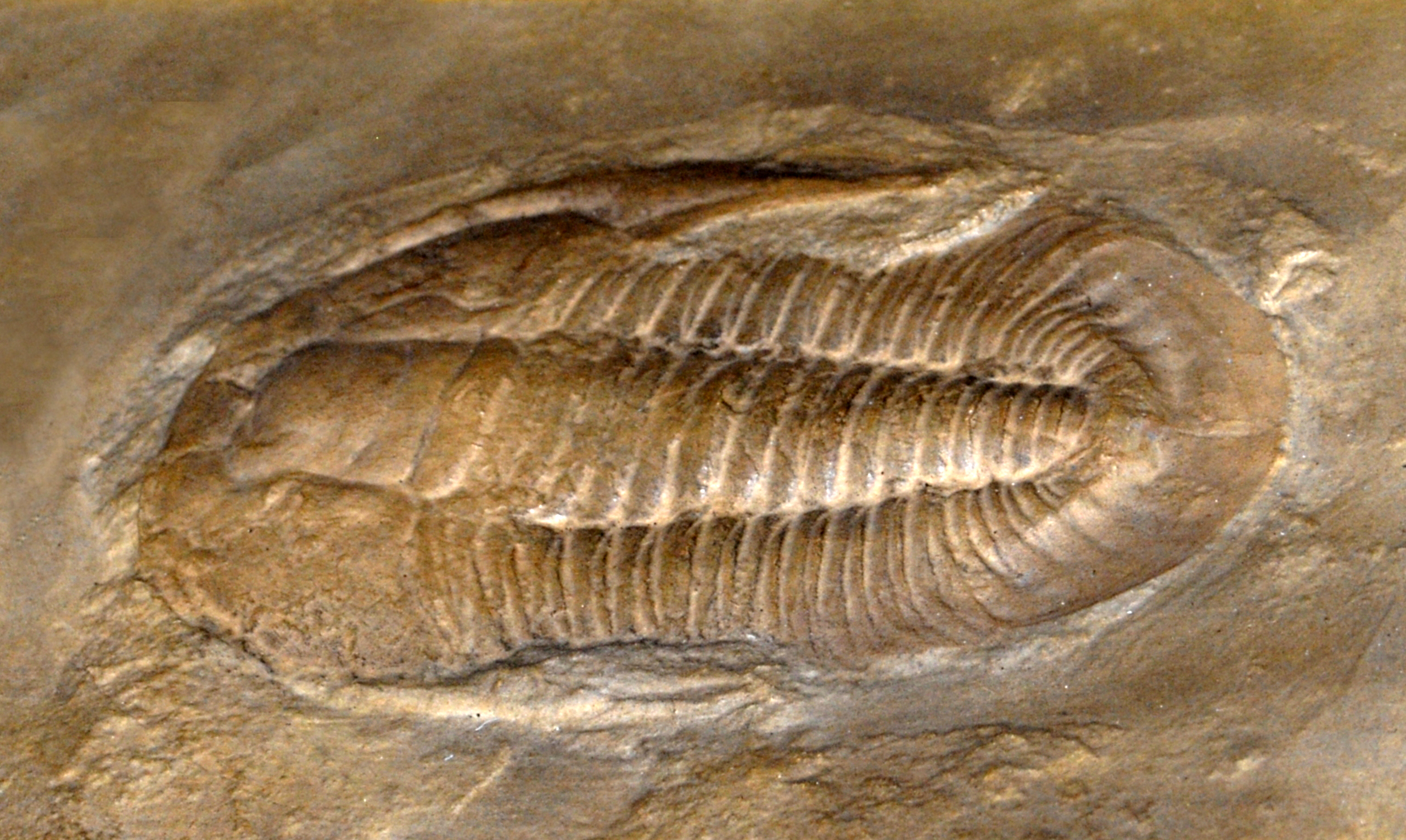
- S. pepinensis from Wisconsin

Scientific classification
- Kingdom: Animalia
- Phylum: Arthropoda
- Clade: †Artiopoda
- Class: †Trilobita
- Order: †Asaphida
- Family: †Saukiidae
- Genus: †Saukiella; Ulrich & Resser, 1933

Species
- S. baikadamica; S. diversa

= Saukiella =

Saukiella Temporal range: Cambrian–Ordovician

Extinct genus of trilobites

Saukiella is a genus of trilobites of the Saukiidae family.

These fast-moving low-level epifaunal deposit feeders lived in the Cambrian and Ordovician periods, from 498.5 to 478.6 Ma.

== Species ==
- Saukiella baikadamica Ergaliev 1980
- Saukiella diversa Qiu 1984
- Saukiella pepinensis (Owen, 1852) (syn. Dikelocephalus pepinensis)

== Distribution ==
Fossils of species within this genus have been found in the Ordovician sediments of Russia and in the Cambrian sediments of Canada, China, Kazakhstan and United States.
