= Yinpanolithus =

Yinpanolithus Temporal range: Late Arenig

Scientific classification
- Domain: Eukaryota
- Kingdom: Animalia
- Phylum: Arthropoda
- Class: †Trilobita
- Order: †Asaphida
- Family: †Trinucleidae
- Genus: †Yinpanolithus; Lu & Chang, 1974

Extinct genus of trilobites

Yinpanolithus is an extinct genus of trilobites in the family Trinucleidae. The genus lived during the later part of the Arenig stage of the Ordovician Period, a faunal stage which lasted from approximately 478 to 471 million years ago.
