= Ningkianolithus =

Ningkianolithus Temporal range: Late Arenig

Scientific classification
- Domain: Eukaryota
- Kingdom: Animalia
- Phylum: Arthropoda
- Class: †Trilobita
- Order: †Asaphida
- Family: †Trinucleidae
- Genus: †Ningkianolithus; Lu, 1954

Extinct genus of trilobites

Ningkianolithus is an extinct genus of trilobites in the family Trinucleidae. The genus lived during the early part of the Arenig stage of the Ordovician Period, a faunal stage which lasted from approximately 478 to 471 million years ago.
