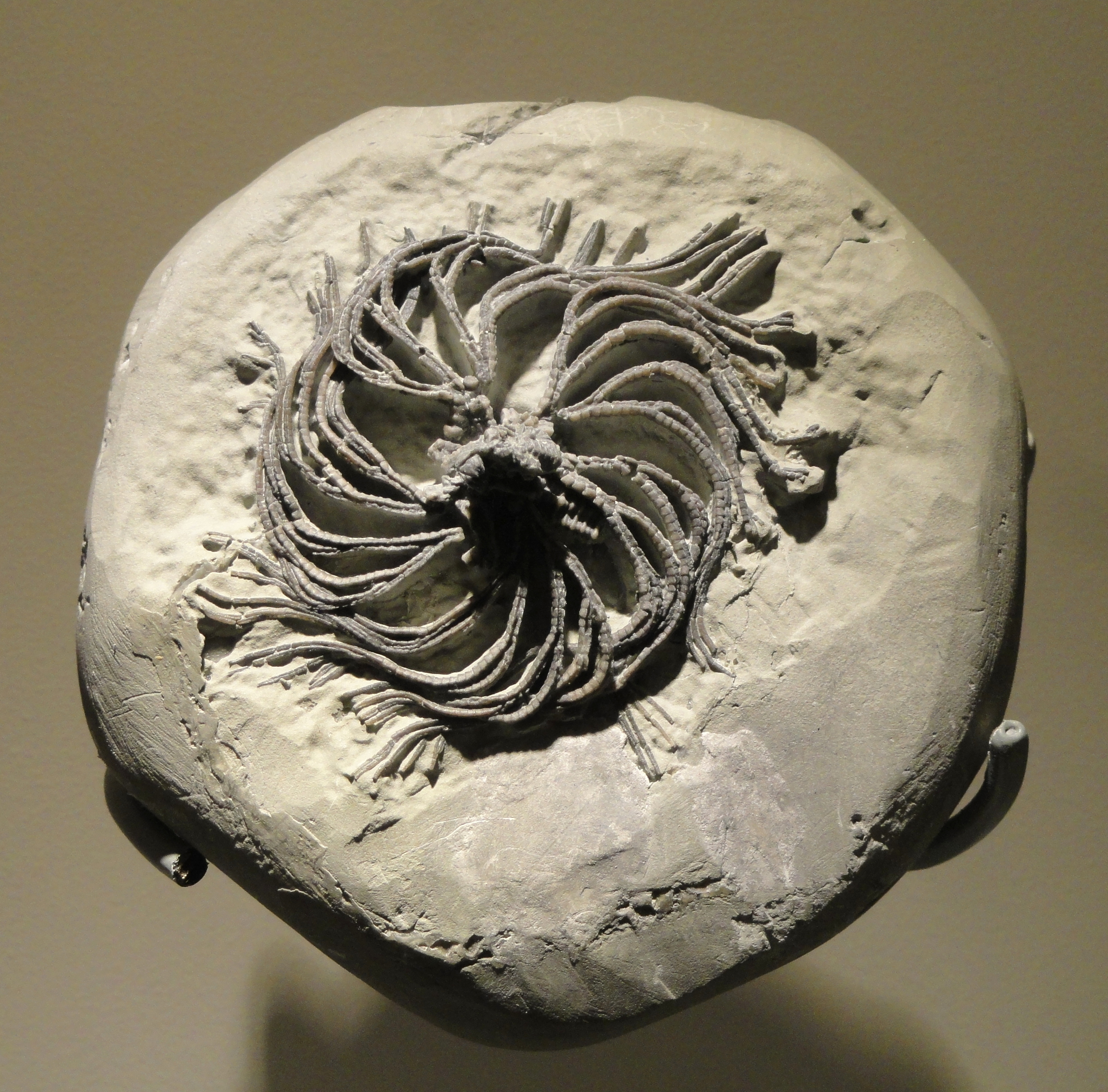

Scientific classification
- Kingdom: Animalia
- Phylum: Echinodermata
- Class: Crinoidea
- Parvclass: †Disparida
- Family: †Iocrinidae
- Genus: †Iocrinus; Hall, 1866

= Iocrinus =

Extinct genus of crinoids

Iocrinus is an extinct genus of crinoid (sea lilies and feather stars). It is an early form of crinoid, from the Ordovician rock of North America, England, and Gilwern Hill, Powys in Wales.

== Selected species ==
- Iocrinus brithdirensis
- Iocrinus crassus
- Iocrinus pauli
- Iocrinus shelvensis
- Iocrinus similis
- Iocrinus subcrassus
- Iocrinus trentonensis
- Iocrinus whitteryi
