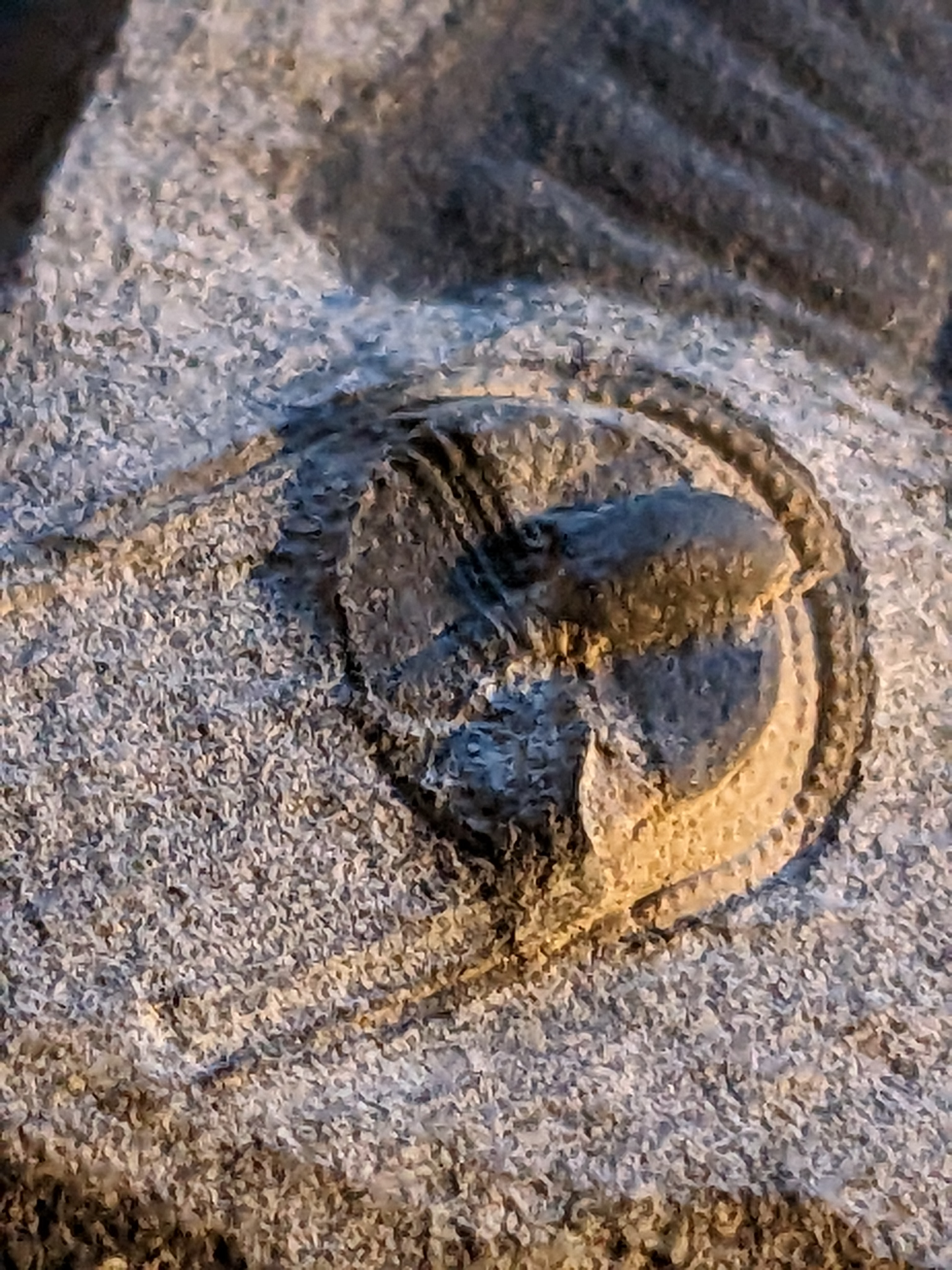
- Bettonolithus Chamberlaini

Scientific classification
- Kingdom: Animalia
- Phylum: Arthropoda
- Clade: †Artiopoda
- Class: †Trilobita
- Order: †Asaphida
- Family: †Trinucleidae
- Genus: †Bettonolithus; Morris, 1988

= Bettonolithus =

Bettonolithus Temporal range: 461–466 Ma

Extinct genus of trilobites

Bettonolithus is a genus of trilobites of the Order Asaphida. It is in the family Trinucleidae.

Fossil specimens have been found in the Lower Ordovician rocks of Gilwern Hill in Powys, Wales.

This trilobite was blind but anatomical evidence suggests it sifted organic matter on the seabed.
