= Gilwern Hill, Powys =

Hill in Powys, Wales

Coordinates: 52°12′N 3°20′W

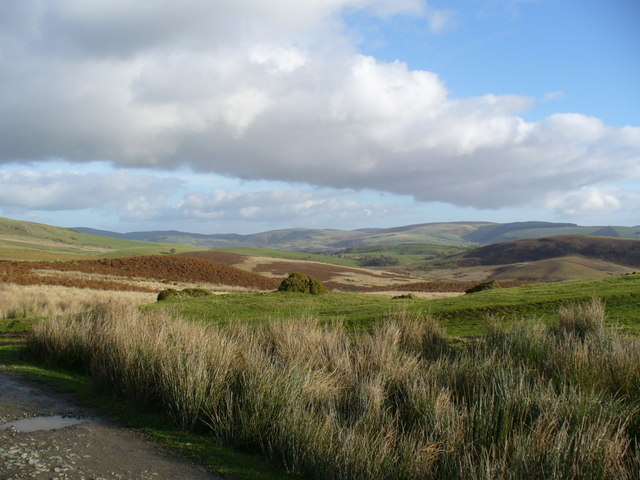
View looking across Gilwern Hill from the west

Gilwern Hill is a hill about 3 mi / 5 km southeast of Llandrindod Wells in the county of Powys, Wales.

== Geology ==
The hill is composed from a range of lower and middle Ordovician volcaniclastic rocks which form a part of the Builth Inlier. Palaeontologists Pete Lawrance and Brian Beveridge have spent 30 years examining fossils from a privately owned limestone quarry on the hill. Amongst fossils so far identified at this location are the trilobites Meadowtownella, Bettonolithus, Protolloydolithus and Anebolithus together with Conulariida, Iocrinus, Clonograptus and starfish

== Stone rows ==
There are two prehistoric stone rows at the southern end of the hill, each with a large stone, more than 2m high, at one end.
