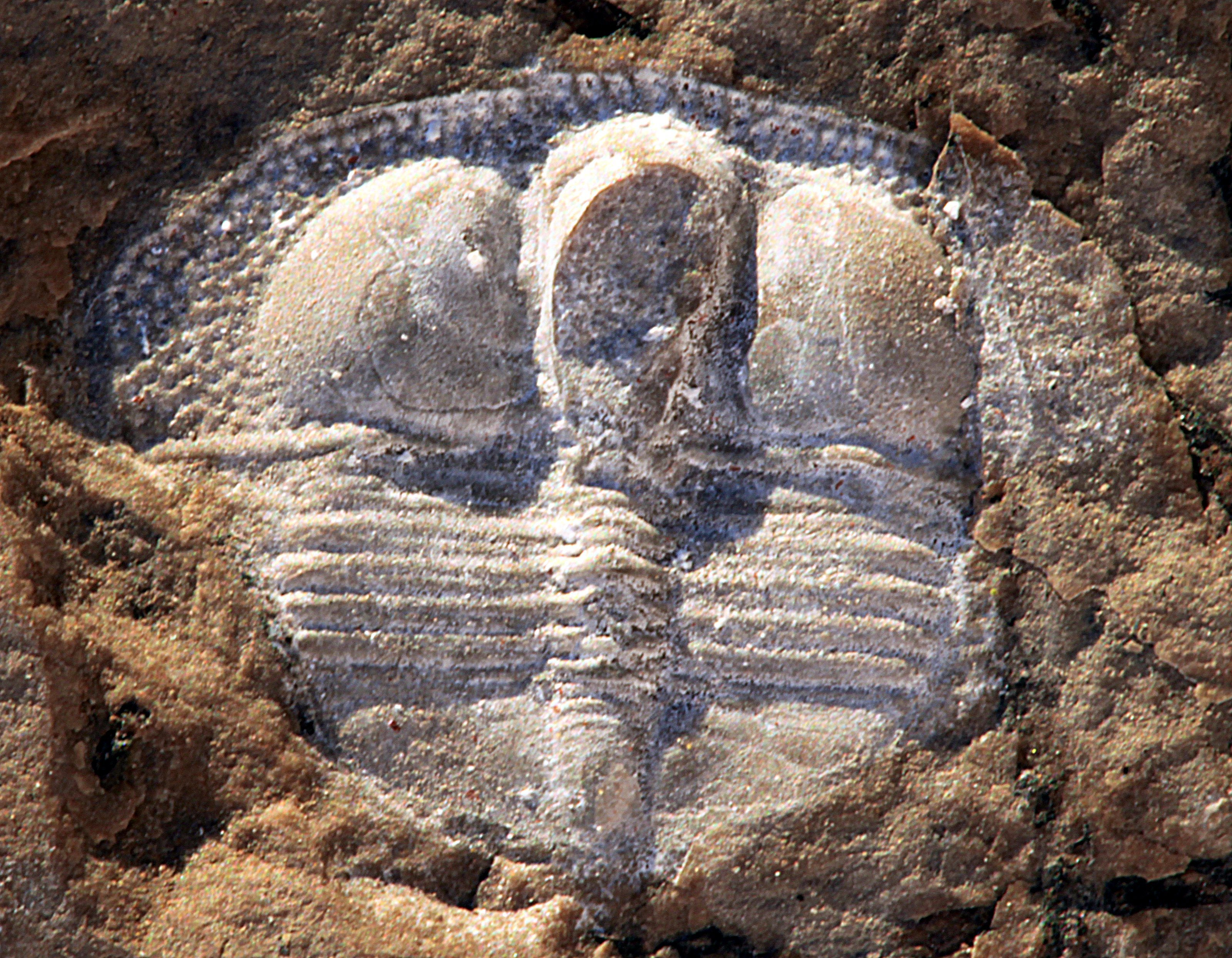
- Cryptolithoides ulrichi, 12 mm (0.47 in)

Scientific classification
- Kingdom: Animalia
- Phylum: Arthropoda
- Clade: †Artiopoda
- Class: †Trilobita
- Order: †Asaphida
- Superfamily: †Trinucleioidea
- Family: †Trinucleidae; Hawle & Corda, 1847

Subfamilies
- Trinucleinae Hawle and Corda, 1847; Cryptolithinae Angelin, 1854; Hanchungolithinae Lu, 1963; Marrolithinae Hughes, 1975; Reedolithinae Hughes, 1975; see text for genera

= Trinucleidae =

Trinucleidae Temporal range: Ordovician

Extinct family of trilobites

Trinucleidae is a family of small to average size asaphid trilobites that first occurred at the start of the Ordovician and became extinct at the end of that period. It contains approximately 227 species divided over 51 genera in 5 subfamilies. The most conspicuous character is the wide perforated fringe of the head.

== Description ==
Trinucleids have a relatively large headshield, that is characterized by a highly vaulted pear-shaped glabella, separated by deep furrows from the cheeks that are often vaulted too, but less so. To the front and sides of this tri-nucleate centre is a wide seam (or fringe), that often inclinates towards the outer margin, and is perforated by funnel shaped pits. These pits are only in one row at the front in the first occurring genera, irregularly distributed in early species, but in later species these are largely arranged in several rows parallel to the margin, and in arches more or less perpendicular to the margin. The thorax consists of six short but wide segments, the outline of which is a continuation of the cheeks. The axis is narrow, less than 1/3× as wide as each of the ribs (or pleurae) to its sides. The tailshield, termed pygidium, is small, approximately wide triangular, with the axis narrow triangular, reaching the border. The axial rings and ribs become less conspicuous further to the back.

== Ecology ==
Trinucleids lived in deeper water. At first, the pits in the fringe were considered to have a sensory function, but the suggestion that they may play a role in filtering food particles was introduced however now this has also been disproved with no specimen ever having a clear hole shown in the pit, which is that would be expected if filter feeding was its purpose.

== Distribution ==
Myinda and Myindella are the earliest genera that occur in the Lower Tremadocian of Avalonia. The family started diversifying during the Floian, had a major diversification burst in the Darriwilian, and remained important until its demise at the end over the Ordovician. During the Lower Ordovician the family was present in Gondwana and associated areas, but in the Dapingian it spread to Baltica and Laurentia, and it remained cosmopolitan after.

== Genera ==
- Anebolithus
- Australomyttonia
- Bancroftolithus
- Bergamia
- Bettonolithus
- Botrioides
- Broeggerolithus
- Costonia
- Cryptolithoides
- Cryptolithus
- Deanaspis
- Declivolithus
- Decordinaspis
- Eirelithus
- Famatinolithus
- Fantasticolithus
- Furcalithus
- Guandacolithus
- Gymnostomix
- Hanchungolithus
- Hunickenolithus
- Incaia
- Jianxilithus
- Kimakaspis
- Lloydolithus
- Lordshillia
- Marekolithus
- Marrolithoides
- Marrolithus
- Microdiscus
- Myinda
- Myindella
- Myttonia
- Nankinolithus
- Ningkianolithus
- Novaspis
- Onnia
- Paratretaspis
- Paratrinucleus
- Parkesolithus
- Pragolithus
- Protoincaia
- Protolloydolithus
- Reedolithus
- Reuscholithus
- Salterolithus
- Smeathenia
- Stapeleyella
- Telaeomarrolithus
- Tetrapsellium
- Tretaspis
- Trinucleus
- Whittardolithus
- Xiushuilithus
- Yinpanolithus
