= Anebolithus =

Scientific classification
- Domain: Eukaryota
- Kingdom: Animalia
- Phylum: Arthropoda
- Class: †Trilobita
- Order: †Asaphida
- Family: †Trinucleidae
- Genus: †Anebolithus; Hughes & Wright, 1970

Species
- A. simplicior Whittard, 1966; A. tafuri Hughes, Rickards & Williams, 1980

Extinct genus of trilobites

Anebolithus is a genus of trilobites found in Gilwern Hill, Powys, Wales. Anebolithus, like other trinucleids, was blind.
