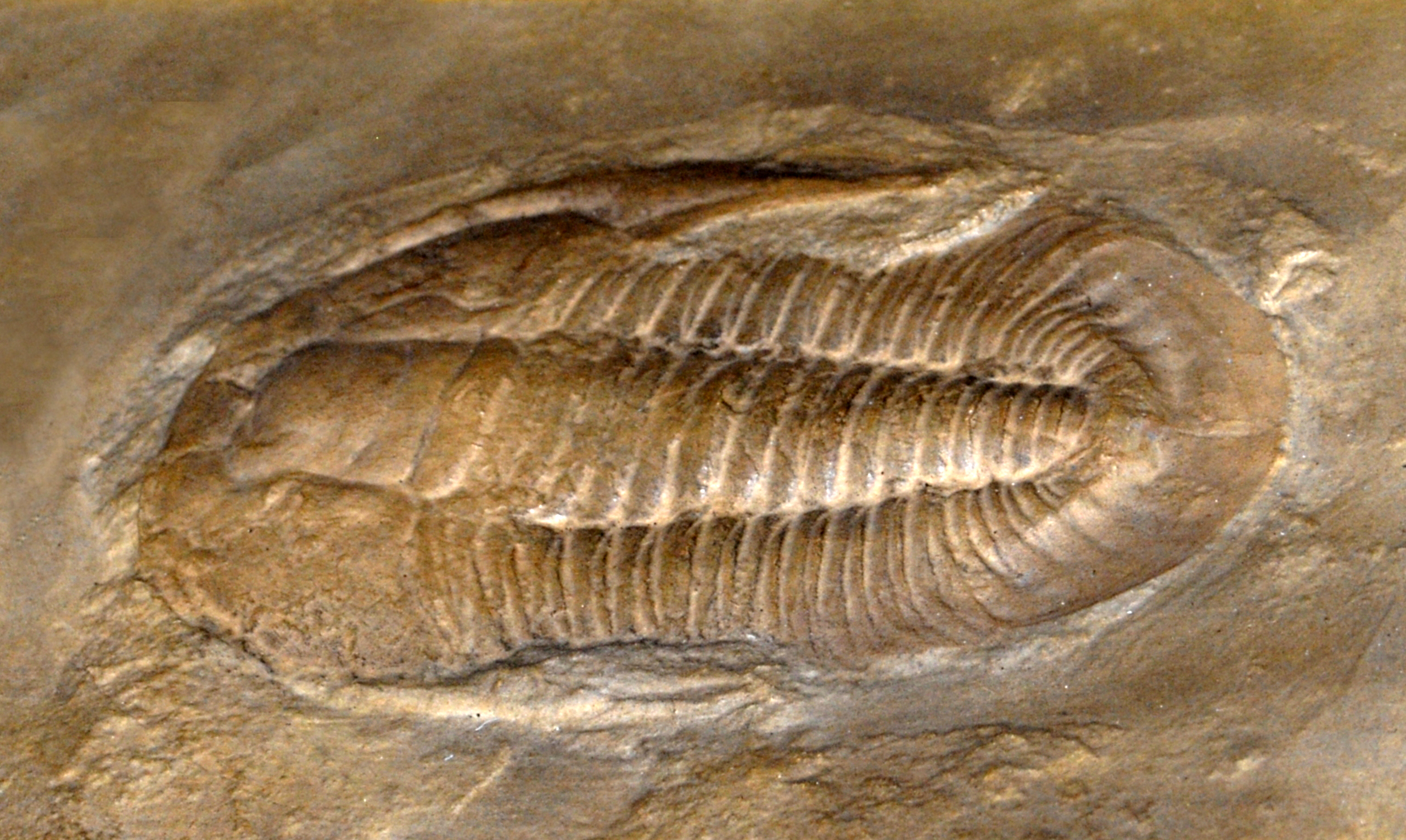
- Saukiella pepinensis from Wisconsin

Scientific classification
- Kingdom: Animalia
- Phylum: Arthropoda
- Clade: †Artiopoda
- Class: †Trilobita
- Order: †Asaphida
- Superfamily: †Dikelocephaloidea
- Family: †Saukiidae; Ulrich and Resser 1930

Genera
- See text

= Saukiidae =

Saukiidae Temporal range: Cambrian–Ordovician

Extinct family of trilobites

Saukiidae is a family of trilobites of the Asaphida order.

These fast-moving low-level epifaunal deposit feeders lived in the Cambrian and Ordovician periods, from 494.0 to 478.6 Ma.

== Genera ==
- Anderssonella Kobayashi 1936
- Calvinella Walcott 1914
- Diemanosaukia Jago and Corbett 1990
- Linguisaukia Peng 1984
- Lophosaukia Shergold 1971
- Mictosaukia Shergold 1975
- Prosaukia Ulrich and Resser 1933
- Pseudocalvinella Qiu 1984
- Saukia Walcott 1914
- Saukiella Ulrich and Resser 1933
- Stigmaspis Nelson 1951
- Tellerina Ulrich and Resser 1933
