= Protolloydolithus =

Protolloydolithus Temporal range: 463.5–457.5 Ma

Scientific classification
- Domain: Eukaryota
- Kingdom: Animalia
- Phylum: Arthropoda
- Class: †Trilobita
- Order: †Asaphida
- Family: †Trinucleidae
- Genus: †Protolloydolithus; Williams, 1948

Extinct genus of trilobites

Protolloydolithus is a genus of trinucleid trilobites found in Ordovician rocks in Gilwern Hill, Powys, Wales.
