= Famatinolithus =

Famatinolithus Temporal range: Early Arenig

Scientific classification
- Domain: Eukaryota
- Kingdom: Animalia
- Phylum: Arthropoda
- Class: †Trilobita
- Order: †Asaphida
- Family: †Trinucleidae
- Genus: †Famatinolithus; Harrington & Leanza, 1957

Species
- F. noticus

Extinct genus of trilobites

Famatinolithus is an extinct genus from a well-known class of fossil marine arthropods, the trilobites. It lived during the early part of the Arenig stage of the Ordovician Period, a faunal stage which lasted from approximately 478 to 471 million years ago.
