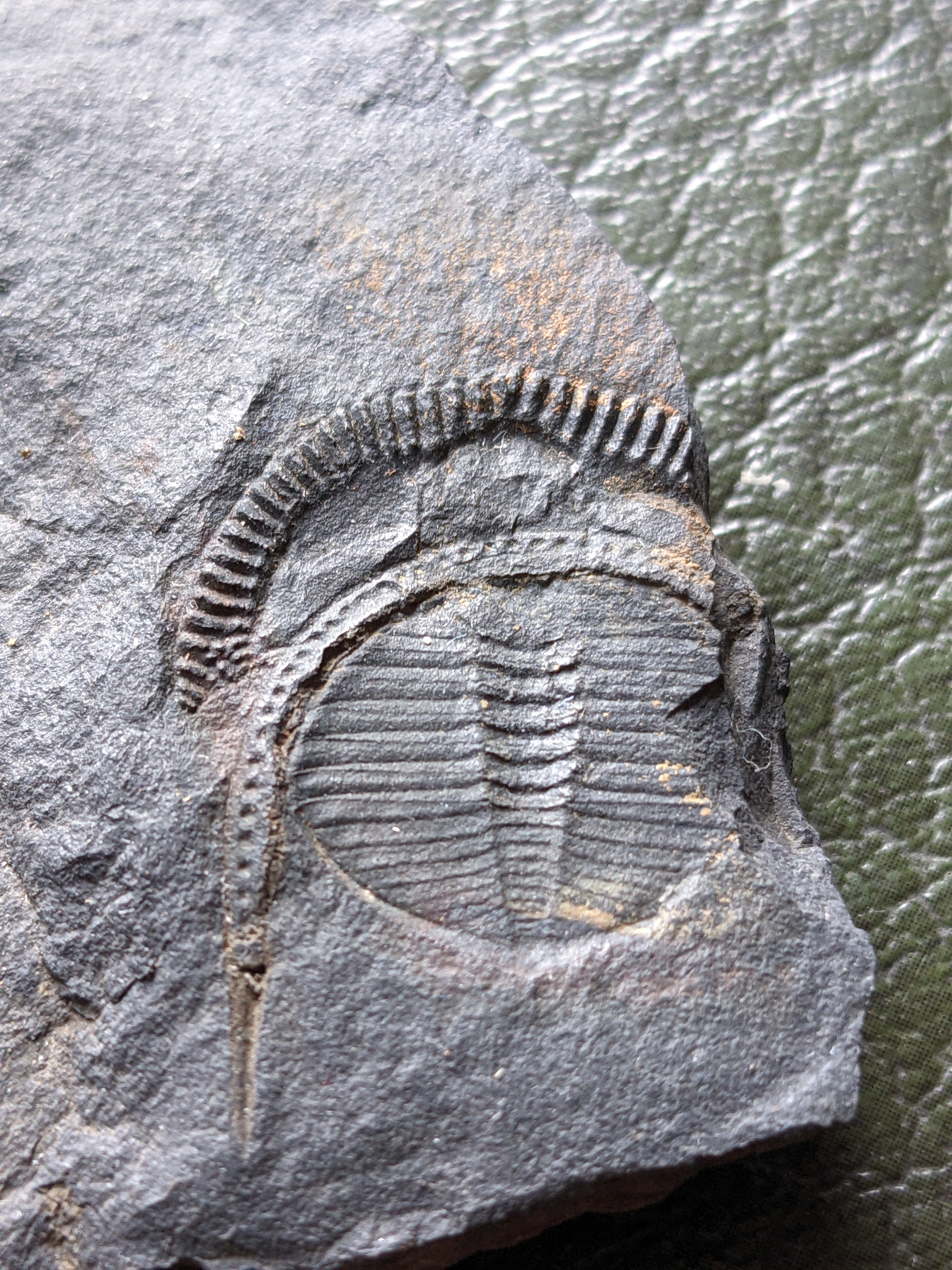
- Trinucleus fimbriatus

Scientific classification
- Kingdom: Animalia
- Phylum: Arthropoda
- Clade: †Artiopoda
- Class: †Trilobita
- Order: †Asaphida
- Family: †Trinucleidae
- Genus: †Trinucleus; Murchison, 1839

= Trinucleus =

Trinucleus Temporal range: 461–466 Ma

Extinct genus of trilobites

Trinucleus is a genus of trilobites of the order Asaphida. It is in the family Trinucleidae.

Fossil specimens are found in the Ordovician rocks of Powys, Wales.

This trilobite was blind and although the exact function of the pits and bars surrounding the cephalon are unknown, anatomical evidence suggests this trilobite sifted organic matter on the seabed.

The specimen shown has the lower side of the rostral plate and genal spines displaced from the cephalon.
