= Late Ordovician =

Third and final epoch of the Ordovician Period, 458–444 million years ago

Late/Upper Ordovician
- 458.2 ± 0.7 – 443.1 ± 0.9 Ma
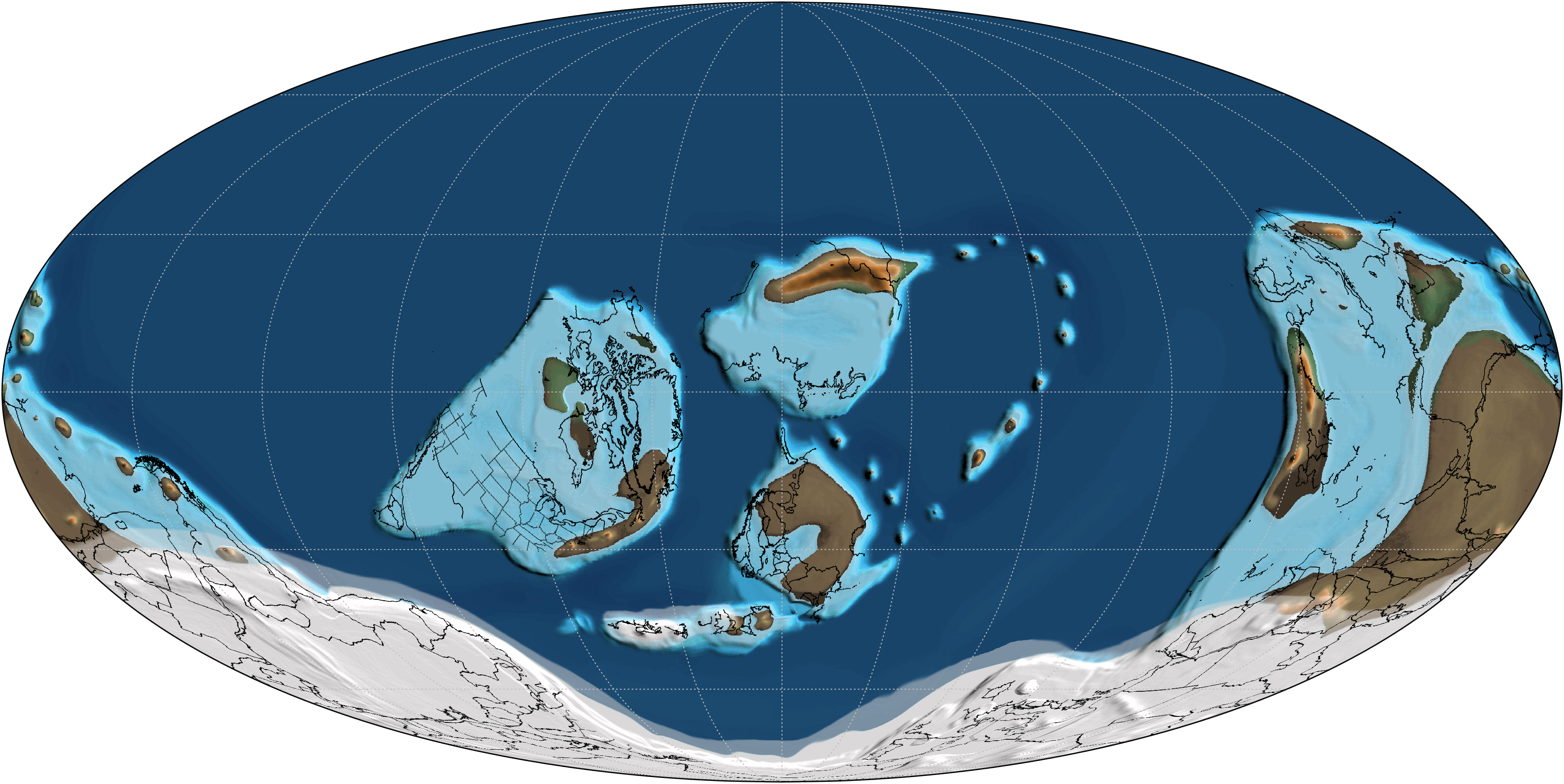
- A map of Earth as it appeared 450 million years ago during the Late Ordovician Epoch, Katian Age

Chronology
← / First land plant spores; ← / Ordovician meteor event
Subdivision of the Ordovician according to the ICS, as of 2024. Vertical axis scale: Millions of years ago

Etymology
- Name formality: Formal

Usage information
- Celestial body: Earth
- Regional usage: Global (ICS)
- Time scale(s) used: ICS Time Scale

Definition
- Chronological unit: Epoch
- Stratigraphic unit: Series
- Time span formality: Formal

The Late Ordovician is the third and final epoch of the Ordovician period, lasting 15.1 million years and spanning from around 458.2 to 443.1 million years ago. The rocks associated with this epoch are referred to as the Upper Ordovician Series.

At this time, Western and Central Europe and North America collided to form Laurentia, while glaciers built up in Gondwana, which was positioned over the South Pole. This caused a drop in global temperatures, resulting in "ice house" conditions.

For most of this time, life continued to flourish, but at and near the end of the period, there were mass-extinction events that seriously affected planktonic forms like conodonts, graptolites, and some groups of trilobites (Agnostida and Pytchopariida, which completely died out, and the Asaphida which were much reduced). Brachiopods, bryozoans and echinoderms were also heavily affected, and the endocerid cephalopods died out completely, except for possible rare Silurian forms. The Ordovician-Silurian Extinction Events may have been caused by an ice age that occurred at the end of the Ordovician period as the end of the Late Ordovician was one of the coldest times in the last 600 million years of Earth history.
