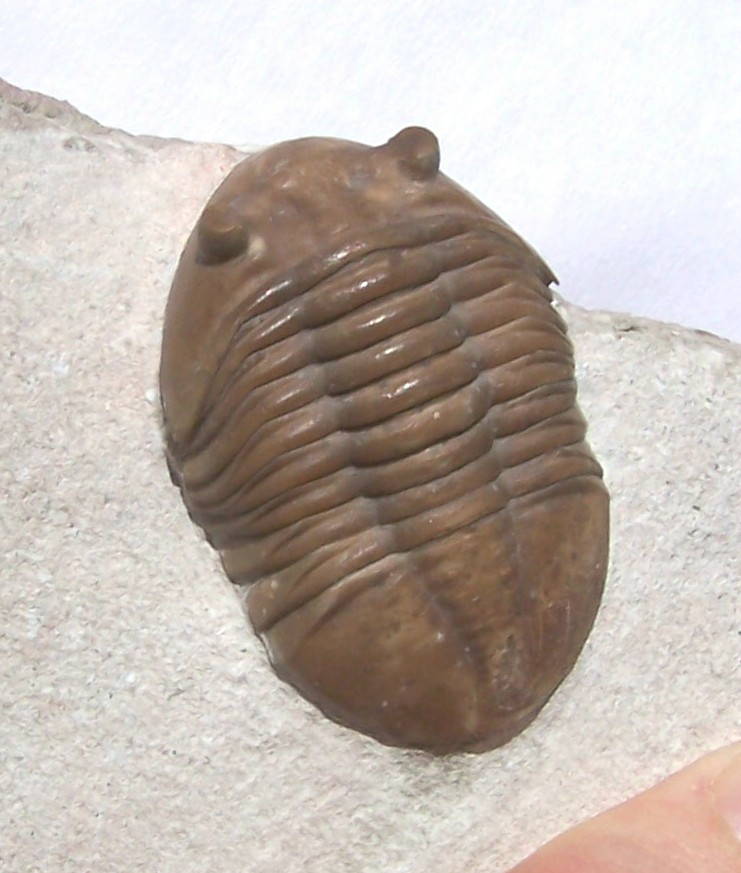
- Asaphus lepidurus

Scientific classification
- Kingdom: Animalia
- Phylum: Arthropoda
- Clade: †Artiopoda
- Class: †Trilobita
- Subclass: †Librostoma
- Order: †Asaphida; Fortey & Chatterton, 1988

Superfamilies
- Anomocaroidea; Asaphoidea; Cyclopygoidea; Dikelocephaloidea; Remopleuridoidea; Trinucleioidea?

= Asaphida =

Asaphida Temporal range: Middle Cambrian–Silurian

Extinct order of trilobites

Asaphida is a large, morphologically diverse order of trilobites found in marine strata dated from the Middle Cambrian until their extinction during the Silurian. Asaphida contains six superfamilies (Anomocaroidea, Asaphoidea, Cyclopygoidea, Dikelocephaloidea, Remopleuridoidea and Trinucleioidea), but no suborders.

In 2020, the superfamily Trinucleioidea was proposed to be raised to an order (Trinucleida) and removed from Asaphida.

== Morphology ==
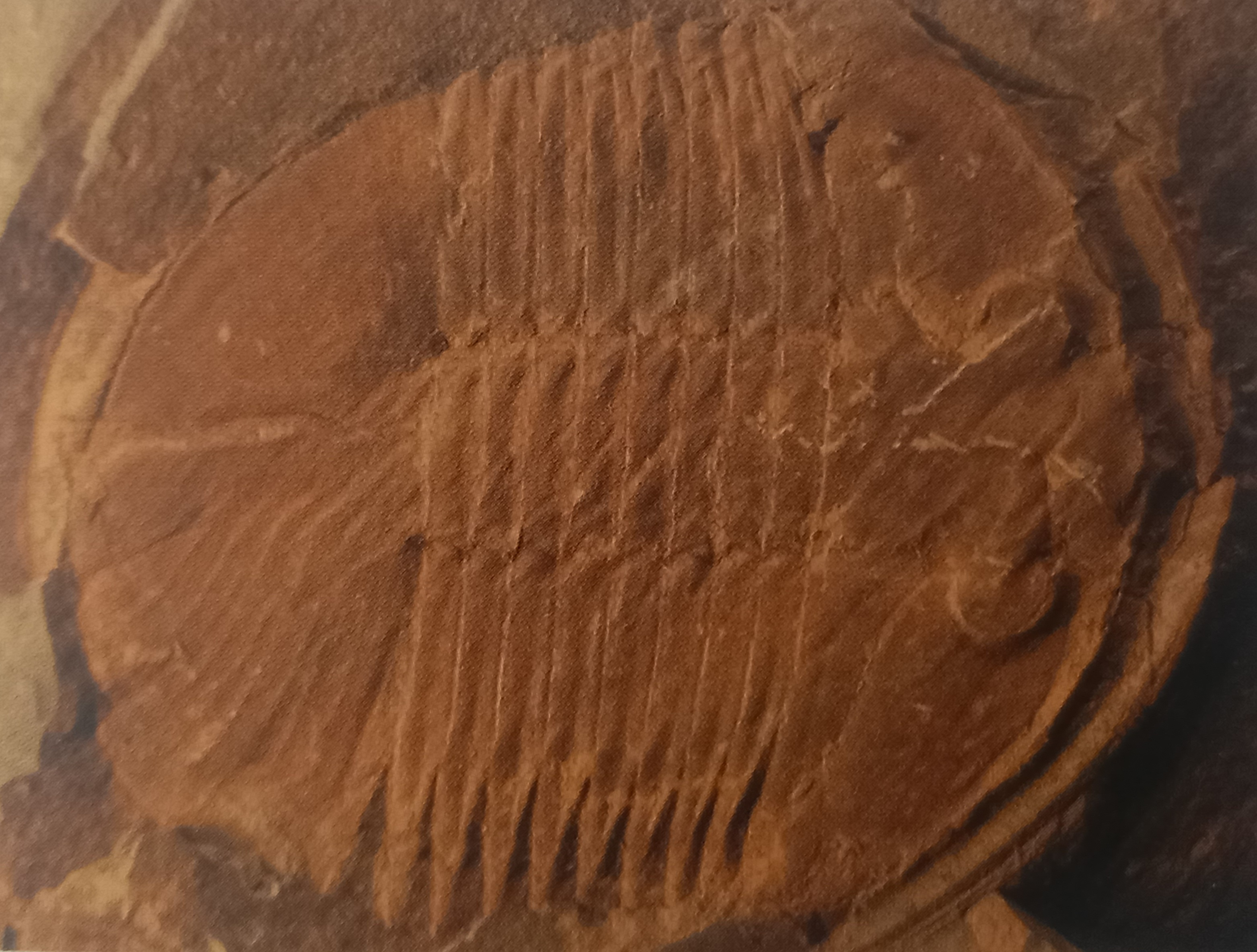
Asaphellus sp.

The Asaphids generally have cephalon (head) and pygidium (tail) parts similar in size, and most species have a prominent median ventral suture. Heads are often flat, and carapace furrows in the head area are often faint or not visible. Thoracic segments typically number 5 - 12, though some species have as few as two and some as many as 30. They also generally have a wide doublure, or rim, that surrounds the cephalon. This causes some specimens to be described as having a characteristic "snowplow" shaped cephalon. When present, eyes are typically large.

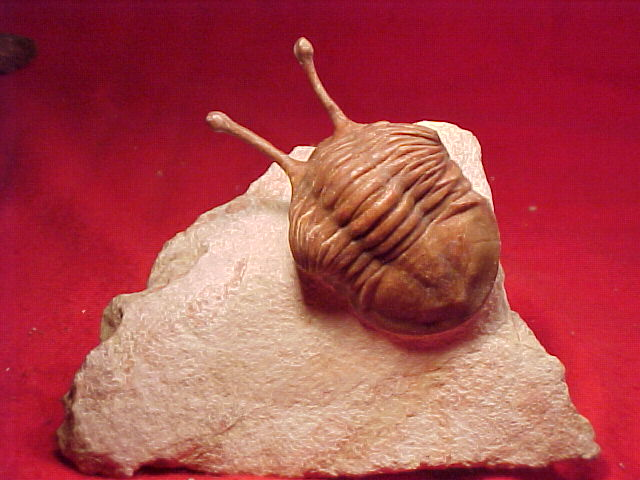
Asaphus kowalewski

One Asaphida line, the superfamily Asaphoidea, shows a continuous evolution of eyestalks, from individuals with stubby eyes to Asaphus kowalewskii, a trilobite with long eyestalks. This line is found in the Middle Ordovician Asery Level deposits of the Volkhov River region near Saint Petersburg, Russia. During the Ordovician, the region that is now Eastern Europe was a shallow inland sea. This eyestalk development is believed to be an adaptation to changes in turbidity during this time, with eye-stalked trilobites like A. kowalewski presumably arising in a time of increased turbidity. One thought is that this trilobite may have lain in wait for prey buried in the bottom sediment with only its periscope eyestalks protruding.

The major extinction event marking the end of the Ordovician Period reduced the diversity of all trilobite orders with most asaphid families disappearing. The only surviving asaphids were members of superfamily Trinucleioidea, and they too disappeared before the end of the Silurian Period.

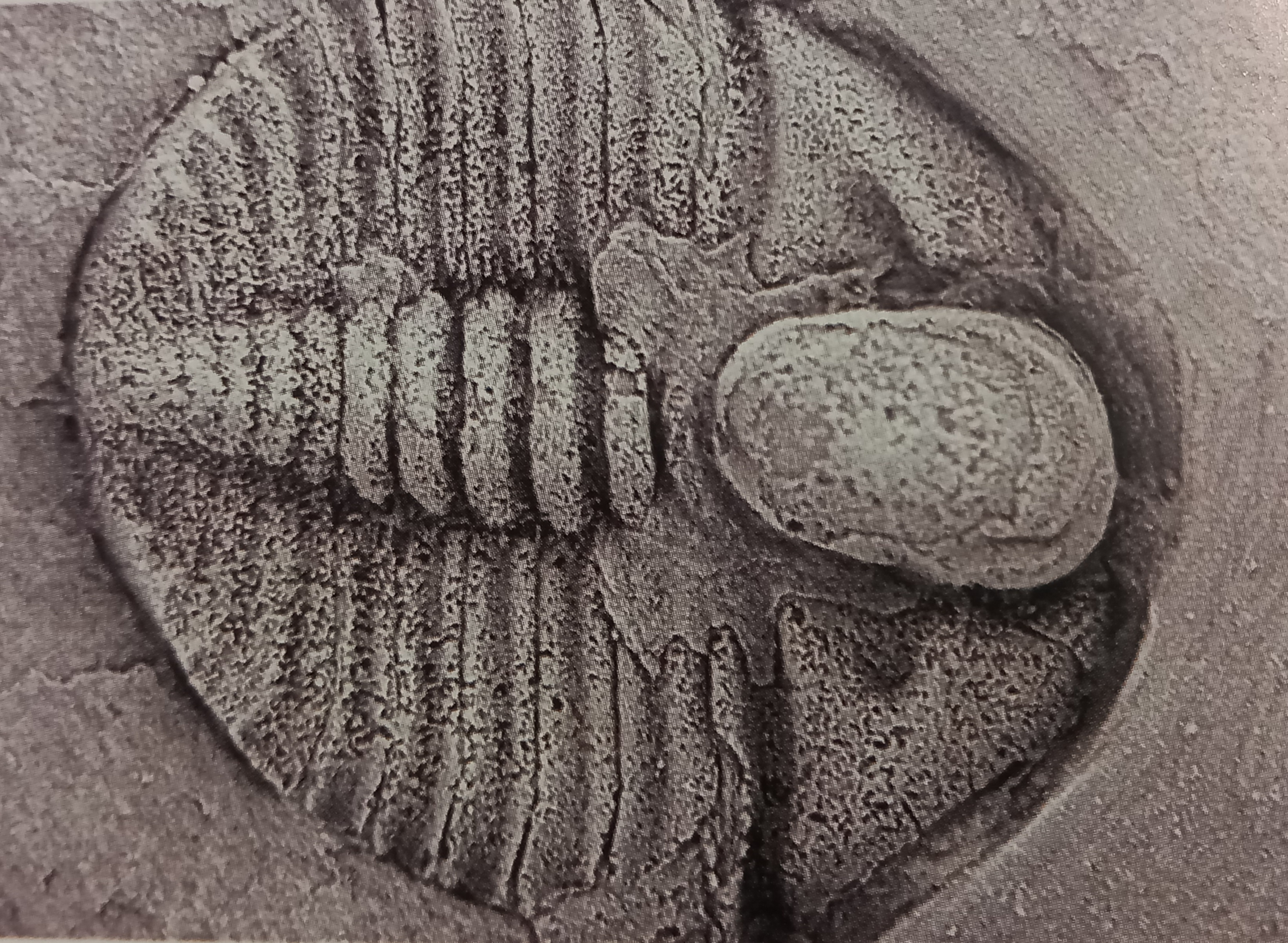
Damghanampyx ghobadipour

== Taxonomy ==
The following superfamilies and families are included:

- Superfamily Anomocaroidea
  - Andrarinidae
  - Anomocarellidae
  - Anomocaridae
  - Aphelaspididae
  - Parabolinoididae
  - Pterocephaliidae
- Superfamily Asaphoidea
  - Asaphidae
  - Ceratopygidae
- Superfamily Cyclopygoidea
  - Cyclopygidae
  - Nileidae(?)
  - Taihungshaniidae
- Superfamily Dikelocephaloidea
  - Dikelocephalidae
  - Eurekiidae
  - Ptychaspididae
  - Saukiidae
- Superfamily Remopleuridioidea
  - Auritamidae
  - Bohemillidae
  - Hungaiidae
  - Idahoiidae
  - Remopleurididae
- Superfamily Trinucleioidea ?
  - Alsataspididae
  - Dionididae
  - Liostracinidae
  - Raphiophoridae
  - Trinucleidae
- incertae sedis
  - Rhyssometopidae (includes Mapaniidae, Plectriferidae)
  - Monkaspididae (Chelidonocephalidae ?)
