= Bronsil Shale =

Geologic formation in Herefordshire, the United Kingdom

- Stratigraphic range: early Ordovician; ~Tremadocian
- Type: Formation
- Underlies: (Unconformably) May Hill Sandstone
- Overlies: White Leaved Oak Shale
- Thickness: ~1,300 ft (396 m)

Lithology
- Primary: Shale
- Other: Basalt, Diabase

Location
- Region: Herefordshire
- Country: United Kingdom

Type section
- Named by: Groom
- Year defined: 1902

The Bronsil Shale, previously referred to as the "Grey Shale", is a Ordovician aged geologic formation in the Malvern Hills of Herefordshire. It is primarily composed of shales, and contains a range of arthropod and lophotrochozoan fossils.

== Geology ==
The Bronsil Shale, which is unconformably overlain by the May Hill Sandstone, and underlain by the black shales of the White Leaved Oak Shale, is predominately composed of light-blue, light-green and yellowish dark shales and inter-bedded igneous bands, and is split up into 3 distinctive beds. Below the lowest known bed can be found layers intercalated basalts, which feature shale-debris, and attains a thickness of 300 ft (91 m), although its base is unknown.

=== Beds ===
The 3 beds are as follows, in ascending stratigraphic order (lowest to highest) :

- Lower Grey Shales : These shale beds are up to 250 ft (76 m), and similar to the unnamed basalt layers below, are not entirely exposed. Where they are exposed is at the foot of a cottage-garden near the base of Chase-End Hill. The beds are fossiliferous, although only in debris found south of the garden exposure.
- Coal-Hill Igneous Band : These beds are sedimentary in nature, reaching up to 250 ft (76 m), and is also predominately composed of the grey shales which gave the formation its informal name, which are notably baked yellowish-white, and make up 100 ft (30 m) of the beds alone. They can be found exposed in the garden of Coal-Hill Cottage, at the northwestern end of Coal Hill, as well as along a path above the cottage, and towards the southeastern end of Coal Hill along the same path. The upper layers of the beds can also be found outcropping in cottage-garden by a roadside south of Coal Hill, and is composed of dark-gray shales. All shales at these outcroppings are noted to be inter-banded with thin sills of diabase. Whilst fossils are noted to be rare, the upper layers are fossiliferous in nature.
- Upper Grey Shales : These beds are up to 500 ft (150 m) in thickness, and can be found outcropping in two areas, these being in the bed of stream south of Bronsil, and the southeastern corner of Chase-End Hill. These exposures are also fossiliferous in nature. A further potential exposure was located my Groom, either side of a path between Fowlet Farm and Martins, as well as partially exposed layers along a main road near Bronsil Lodge, both of which are also sparsely fossiliferous.

== Dating ==
The early discovery Dictyonema in 1884 saw the shales commonly correlated to the Dictyonema-beds in North Wales and the Shineton Shales in Shropshire, thus seeing it also assigned to the early Tremadocian. This was further supported by the discovery and reporting of more early Ordovician aged trilobites. The later reporting of Anacherirusus in 1902 hinted at the shales potentially also being aged to the late Tremadocian. These findings would also see more researchers push for the then "Tremadoc" to be reassigned as the lowermost stage of the Ordovician period, something which had been occurring for some years prior.

A later study in 1980 would make further correlations to other formations, being correlated to the early Ordovician rocks of the Breadstone Shales in Tortworth, the Merevale Shales of the wider Stockingford Shale Group of the Midlands, the Shineton Shales in Shropshire once again, the Tremadoc Slate in Wales, the Durness Group in the Scottish Highlands, and the Tremadocian to Floian Manx Group on the Isle of Man. This would lend credence to the already well defined temporal range of the shales being Tremadocian.

== Paleobiota ==
The Bronsil Shale contains a range of arthropod fossils, such as the small agnostid Anglagnostus and the pilekiid trilobite Anacheirurus. A large collection of Dictyonema can also be found here, which was the first of many hints towards an Ordovician age for the shales.

Color key: Taxon / Reclassified taxon / Taxon falsely reported as present / Dubious taxon or junior synonym / Ichnotaxon / Ootaxon / Morphotaxon

Notes
Uncertain or tentative taxa are in small text
~~crossed out~~ taxa are discredited.

=== Arthropoda ===
Arthropoda
Genus	Species	Notes	Images
Parabolinella (?)	P. (?) triarthrus	Olenid trilobite.	
Boeckaspis	N. mobergi	Olenid trilobite.	
Niobe	N. homfrayi	Asaphid trilobite.	
Asaphellus	A. affinis	Asaphid trilobite.	
Acanthopleurella	A. grindrodi	Trilobite.	
Platypeltis	P. croftii	Trilobite, which had previously been reported as P. croftii, were it would later be reassigned to Asaphus as A. croftii. The species would finally be reassigned to a new genus, Platypeltoides in 1949.	
Platypeltoides	P. croftii	Nileid trilobite.	
Cheirurus	C. frederici	Cheirurid trilobite, which had previously been reported as C. frederici. It would later be reassigned to Anacheirurus in 1896, retaining the species name of A. frederici.	
Anacheirurus	A. frederici	Pilekiid arthropod.	
Agnostus	A. dux	Agnostid arthropod, which had previously been reported as A. dux. It would later be reassigned to Anglagnostus, still carrying the species name of A. dux.	
Anglagnostus	A. dux	Agnostid arthropod.	

=== Lophotrochozoa ===
Lophotrochozoa
Genus	Species	Notes	Images
Lingula (?)	Lingula (?) sp.	Lingulid brachiopod.	
Linnarssonia	L. belti	Lingulid brachiopod.	
Aerotreta	A.sabrinae; Aerotreta sp. var. A. socialis; Aerotreta sp. var. A. nicholsoni	Acrotretid brachiopod. Reassigned to the genus Eurytreta in 1994 as E. sabrinae.	
Eurytreta	E. sabrinae	Acrotretid brachiopod.	
Obodella (?)	O. (?) salteri	Obolellid brachiopod. Species would be reassigned to Broeggeria as B. salteri in 1902.	
Broeggeria	B. salteri	Elkaniid brachiopod.	
Lingulella (?)	Lingulella (?) sp.	Obolid brachiopod.	
Hyolithus	H. assulatus	Hyolith.	

=== Hemichordata ===
Hemichordata
Genus	Species	Notes	Images
Dictyonema	D. flabelliforme sociale	Callograptid graptolite.	

=== Ichnogenera ===
Ichnogenera
Genus	Species	Notes	Images
Alcyonidiopsis	Alcyonidiopsis sp.	Pellet-filled burrows. The individual pellets within the burrows had been reported under the genus name of Tomaculum in Groom 1902.	
