= White Leaved Oak Shale =

Geologic formation in Herefordshire, the United Kingdom

- Stratigraphic range: late Cambrian; ~Furongian
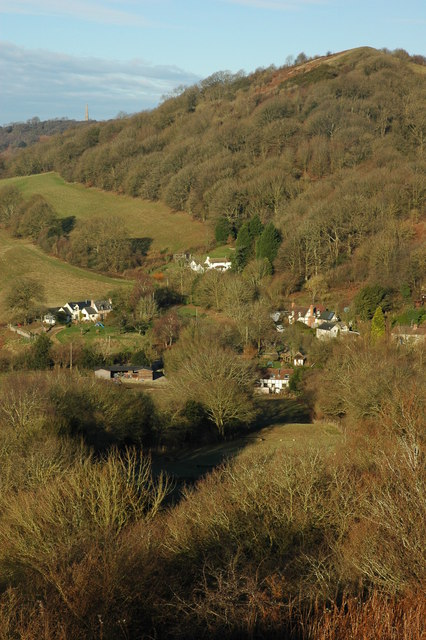
- The hamlet of Whiteleaved Oak, the locality after which the formation is named.
- Type: Formation
- Underlies: Bronsil Shale
- Overlies: (Unconformably) Hollybush Sandstone
- Thickness: ~800 ft (244 m)

Lithology
- Primary: Shale
- Other: Basalt

Location
- Region: Herefordshire
- Country: United Kingdom

Type section
- Named for: Whiteleaved Oak
- Named by: Groom
- Location: Whiteleaved Oak
- Year defined: 1902

The White Leaved Oak Shale, previously referred to as the "Black Shales of Malvern", is a Cambrian aged geologic formation in the Malvern Hills of Herefordshire. It is primarily composed of shales, and contains a range of arthropod and lophotrochozoan fossils.

== History and naming ==
Prior to its formal naming, the White Leaved Oak Shale, the shales had first been recorded by Conybeare in 1822. Later, in 1839, they would be recognised by Roderick Murchison, who would tentatively correlate the shales to the Llandeilo Group. In 1843, John Phillips would report Agnostus, and various other trilobites from the shales. This would see Joachim Barrande place the shales on the horizon of the Lingula-Flags sometime in 1851. In 1884, William Samuel Symonds would report Dictyonema sociale from the overlying Grey Shales, giving credence to Barrande's placement, and backed up by Thomas Belt's research into the Lingula-Flags in 1867. Throughout the period of time, the shales would simply be referred to as the "Black Shales of Malvern", or the "Black Shales".

The shales would be formally named in 1902 by Theodore Groom as the "White-Leaved-Oak Shales", named for by the hamlet of Whiteleaved Oak, which sits on the Hereford side of the Malvern Hills. The hyphens would slowly be dropped, leaving the name to be spelled as "White Leaved Oak Shale".

== Geology ==
The White Leaved Oak Shale, which is overlain by the Ordovician grey Bronsil Shale, and unconformably underlain by the pale olive-green Hollybush Sandstone, is predominately composed of black shales and inter-bedded igneous bands, and is split up into 4 distinctive beds, with the lower two commonly group together.

=== Beds ===
The 4 beds are as follows, in ascending stratigraphic order (lowest to highest) :

- Lower Black Shales and Lower White-Leaved-Oak Igenous Bands : These beds are only found outcropping in the hamlet of Whiteleaved Oak, and in nearby fields to the north-west. The shales here are reported as being a deep bluish-black colour, up to 250 ft (76 m) thick. The igneous bands in this bed have yielded a varied collection of fossils.
- Upper White-Leaved-Oak Igneous Band : These beds are predominately composed of bleach-white, olivine rich basalts, which are inter-bedded with dark shales, and reaches up to 300 ft (91 m) in thickness. They can be found exposed in a road leading southwards out of Whiteleaved Oak, as well as along a footpath at Fowlet Farm. Throughout can also be found loose fragments of dark-grey shelly limestone, which have seen been attributed to younger Mesozoic rocks, alongside the fossils found within them. There can also be found a collection of fossils here.
- Upper Black Shales : These beds can be found outcropping at a small escarpment, traversing along the north-east side of Pendock's Grove, as well as a road leading south-westward out of Whiteleaved Oak, with the best exposure being found in a lane leading southward out of the hamlet. The shales here are, as the name of the bed suggests, black in colouration, and attain a thickness of 150 ft (46 m). Similar to the other beds, the rocks here are also fossiliferous in nature, although fossils vanish towards the upper layers of the bed.

== Dating ==
Whilst it has not been properly dated, the White Leaved Oak Shale has been correlated with several formations across the UK, being correlated to the late Cambrian rocks of the Stockingford Shale Group of the Midlands, the Shoot Rough Road and Bentleyford Shales in Shropshire, the Treffgarne Bridge Beds in South West Wales, the Maentwog, Festiniog and Dolgelly Beds of the Caernarfonshire Slate Belt, the Clara Group in County Wicklow, and the Askingarran Formation of County Wexford. This sees the rocks dated to sometime during the Furongian Epoch of the Cambrian, which gives credence to prior studies.

== Paleobiota ==
The White Leaved Oak Shale contains a range of arthropod fossils, such as the small agnostid Lotagnostus and the cyclotronid Cyclotron. Sparse mollusca records are also known, such as Eurytreta and Lingulella. Tentative sponge spicules have also been recovered from this formation. Foraminiferans, Ostrocods, and echinoderm spines had previously been reported from various localities in the formation, although a later study undertaken by Alan Wood in 1946 would see these all regarded as being falsely reported, instead likely hailing from younger rocks further up.

Color key: Taxon / Reclassified taxon / Taxon falsely reported as present / Dubious taxon or junior synonym / Ichnotaxon / Ootaxon / Morphotaxon

Notes
Uncertain or tentative taxa are in small text
~~crossed out~~ taxa are discredited.

=== Arthropoda ===
Arthropoda
Genus	Species	Notes	Images
Agnostus	A. trisectus	Agnostid arthropod, which had previously been reported as A. pisiformis and A. princeps. Species would later be reassigned to the new genus Lotagnostus by Frederick William Whitehouse in 1936.	
Lotagnostus	L. trisectus	Agnostid arthropod.	
Sphaerophthalmus	S. alatus	Olenid trilobite.	
Ctenopyge	Ctenopyge sp.; C. bisulcata; C. pecten; C. flagellifer	Olenid trilobite.	
Peltura	P. scarabaeoides	Olenid trilobite.	
Polyphyma	P. lapworthi	Ostracod. Possibly a false report, although it has been noted that ancestral forms do appear in the late Cambrian. The species would later be reassigned to a new genus, Cyclotron, as the name was already occupied by an incest of the same name.	
Cyclotron	C. lapworthi	Cyclotronid arthropod.	

=== Lophotrochozoa ===
Lophotrochozoa
Genus	Species	Notes	Images
Lingula (?)	L. (?) pygmea	Lingulid brachiopod.	
Linnarssonia (?)	L. (?) belti	Lingulid brachiopod.	
Aerotreta (?)	A. (?) sabrinae var. malvernensis	Acrotretid brachiopod. Reassigned to the genus Eurytreta in 1994 as E. sabrinae.	
Eurytreta	E. sabrinae	Acrotretid brachiopod.	
Obodella (?)	O. (?) salteri	Obolellid brachiopod. Species would be reassigned to Broeggeria as B. salteri in 1902.	
Broeggeria	B. salteri	Elkaniid brachiopod.	
Lingulella	Lingulella sp.; L. nicholsoni; L. pygmea	Obolid brachiopod.	
Kutorgina	K. cinyulata var. pusilla	Kutorginid brachiopod.	
Glyptarca	G. primaeva	Arcid bivalve. Regarded as falsely reported in 1946.	
Hyolithus (?)	H. (?) assulatus	Hyolith.	
Murchisonia (?)	Murchisonia (?) sp.	Gastropod. Regarded as falsely reported in 1946.	

=== Porifera (Sponges) ===
Porifera
Genus	Species	Notes	Images
Protospongia	P. fenestrata	Reticulosan sponge.	

=== Microorganisms ===
Microorganisms
Genus	Species	Notes	Images
Spirillina	S. groomi	Spirillinid foraminiferan. Regarded as falsely reported in 1946, instead coming from Mesozoic aged rocks nearby.	
Cristellaria	Cristellaria sp.	Peneroplid foraminiferan. Synonymised into Peneroplis, although not before it was noted to be falsely reported from this formation.	
Marginulina	Marginulina sp. cf. M. soluta	Marginulinid foraminiferan. Regarded as falsely reported in 1946, instead coming from Mesozoic aged rocks nearby.	
Dentalina	Dentalina sp. cf. D. abnornis	Nodosariid foraminiferan. Regarded as falsely reported in 1946, instead coming from Mesozoic aged rocks nearby.	
Lagena	L. laevis; L. apiculata	Lagenid foraminiferan. Regarded as falsely reported in 1946, instead coming from Mesozoic aged rocks nearby.	
Glandulina (?)	Glandulina (?) sp. cf. G. pgymaea	Foraminiferan.	
