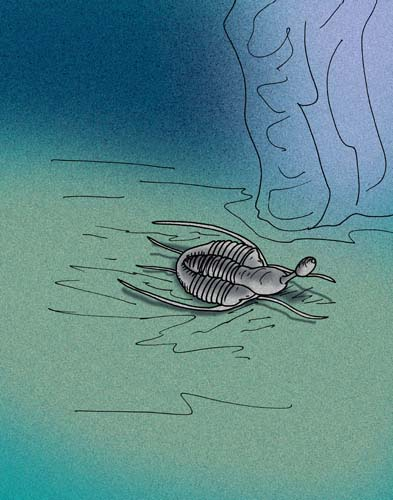
- B. mirabilis

Scientific classification
- Kingdom: Animalia
- Phylum: Arthropoda
- Clade: †Artiopoda
- Class: †Trilobita
- Order: †Asaphida
- Family: †Raphiophoridae
- Genus: †Bulbaspis; Chugaeva, 1956

Type species
- Ampyx bulbifer Weber, 1932

Species groups
- See text

= Bulbaspis =

Bulbaspis Temporal range: Late Ordovician

Extinct genus of trilobites

Bulbaspis ("bulb shield") is a late Ordovician genus of asaphid trilobites of the family Raphiophoridae found primarily in upper Ordovician-aged deepwater marine strata of Kazakhstan, China, and possibly Tasmania. Species of Bulbaspis are similar to other raphiophorids such as Ampyx and Raphiophorus, save that the long spine that emanates from the glabella of the latter two genera has been modified into a knob-like or bulb-like structure in Bulbaspis that developed incrementally in the animal's growth. The function of the bulb is currently unknown: one hypothesis suggests sexual selection may have had a role in its evolution in the genus.

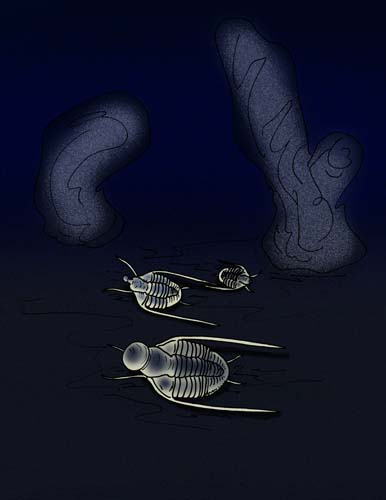
Individuals of B. brevis, demonstrating development of the bulb

== Species ==
- ovulum group
  - B. lageniformis Zhou et al. 1982
  - B. ovulum Weber 1948
  - B. ordosensis Lu et al. 1976
- bulbifer group
  - B. brevis Zhou & Zhou, 2006
  - B. bulbifer (Weber, 1932)
  - B. korlaensis Zhang, 1981
  - B. mirabilis Chugaeva, 1958
  - B. sphaerornatus Chugaeva, 1958

== See also ==
- List of trilobites
