= May Hill Sandstone =

Geologic formation in Wales

- Stratigraphic range: early Silurian; ~Telychian
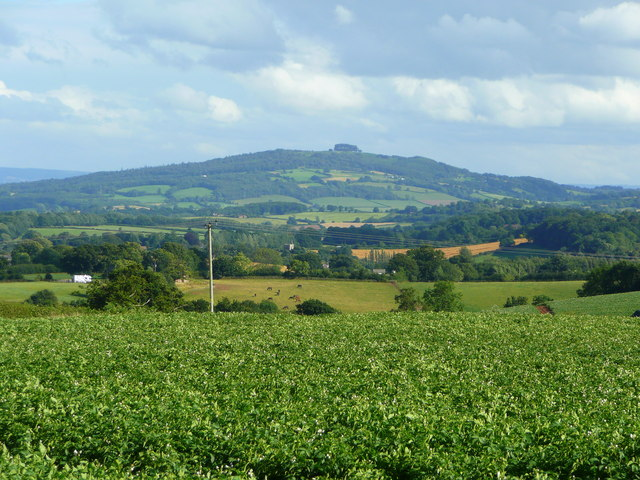
- A view of May Hill, the locality after which the formation is named.
- Type: Formation
- Underlies: Huntley Hill Formation
- Overlies: (unconformably) Bronsil Shale; (unconformably in the Southern Malvern Hills) Malvern Complex
- Thickness: ~700 ft (213 m)

Lithology
- Primary: Sandstone
- Other: Mudstone, Siltstone. Conglomerate

Location
- Region: Herefordshire (and formally Gloucestershire
- Country: United Kingdom

Type section
- Named for: May Hill, Gloucestershire
- Named by: Adam Sedgwick
- Year defined: 1853

The May Hill Sandstone, previously a part of the Caradoc Series, is an Ordovician aged geologic formation in Herefordshire, and previously Gloucestershire prior to it being further split up. Large areas of the formation are fossiliferous in nature, with the fauna predominately composed of brachiopods and corals.

== History and naming ==
Prior to its formal naming, the sandstones had previously been assigned to the Caradoc Series. However, in 1852, Adam Sedgwick went on to examine a locality of the Caradoc Series at May Hill in Gloucestershire, as well as corresponding rocks along the western flank of the Malvern Hills in Herefordshire. Through these examinations, Sedgwick had noted that the fossils of the wider Caradoc Series, and those found in May Hill were considerably different, and thus would propose that the sandstones of May Hill be split from the Caradoc Series into a distinct formation, taking on the name of the "May Hill Sandstone", although not before a few other names were proposed, such as the "Wenlock Grit" or "Wenlock Sandstone".

In 1920, Gardiner would see a large portion of the May Hill Sandstone in the May Hill area split into new distinct formations, namely the Huntley Hill Formation, and Yartleton Formation. Further attempts to split up the rest of the May Hill Sandstone in the Malvern Hills have occurred, although these had never been properly defined, and thus were included back into the May Hill Sandstone.

== Geology ==
When compared to the formations below it, the May Hill Sandstone has a considerably larger geographical range. It can be found outcropping at Gullet Wood at the base of Midsummer Hill, with a thickness up to 700 ft (210 m), and extending for a mile eastwards towards Eastnor in Herefordshire, with the formation being predominately composed of red coarse-grained sandstone. The outcrop at Gullet Wood also extends in a southerly direction from two point, with one major extension extending from the Eastnor extension, down to Howler's Heath before being cut off by Permian breccias, whilst the other minor extension broken up by transverse faults, and forms the eastern rim of a inlier with the underlying Bronsil Shale as far as Ledbury Road, where it continues still southwards, now being faulted on either side by the Bronsil Shales.

At the base of the formation west of Bronsil, the beds are predominately composed of 5 m (16 ft) of red, micaceous mudstone, inter-bedded in several layers with green sandstone. Above this, there are beds up to 30 m (98 ft) thick of brown siltstones and sandstones, followed by beds of a similar thickness composed of pink to purple coarse-grained sandstones, grits, and conglomerates. These layers are then overlain by beds from higher up in the formation.

=== Facies ===
There can also be found two notably facies in the May Hill Sandstone, the first, Type A, being composed of a coarse-grained, massive, gritty type red to chocolate-brown sandstone, whilst Type B is primarily composed of fine-grained, flaggy, buff-coloured sandstone.

== Paleoenvironment ==
The depositional environment of the May Hill Sandstone was likely that of a shallow marine environment, likely a mud-line surrounding continental waters, inferred from the alternating appearance of mica-rich to ferruginous laminae that are predominately gritty in nature, which is common for environments with frequent variation in the overall deposition of sediments, alongside the notable absence of current-bedding accounting for the presence of the mineral glauconite, which commonly forms in sediments of shallow waters.

== Paleobiota ==
The May Hill Sandstone contains a wide range of brachiopods such as Orthis and Stegerhynchus, as well as corals, including Favosites and Palaeocyclus. Alongside this, rare occurrences of other Ordovician fossils have also been found, such as the trilobite Encrinurus, and the notably stratigraphically important crinoid, Petalocrinus.

| Color key: Taxon / Reclassified taxon / Taxon falsely reported as present / Dubious taxon or junior synonym / Ichnotaxon / Ootaxon / Morphotaxon | Notes; Uncertain or tentative taxa are in small text; ~~crossed out~~ taxa are discredited. |

=== Arthropoda ===
Arthropoda
| Genus | Species | Notes | Images |
|---|---|---|---|
| Encrinurus | E. punetatus | Encrinurid trilobite. | |

=== Echinoderm ===
Echinoderm
| Genus | Species | Notes | Images |
|---|---|---|---|
| Petalocrinus | Petalocrinus sp. | Petalocrinid echinoderm. | |

=== Lophotrochozoa ===
Lophotrochozoa
| Genus | Species | Notes | Images |
|---|---|---|---|
| Strophomena | S. simulans (?); S. funiculata; S. peeten; S. englypha | Strophomenid brachiopod. | |
| Leptagonia | L. depressa | Strophomenid brachiopod. | |
| Pholidostrophia | P. salopiensis | Strophomenid brachiopod. | |
| Spirifera | S. crispa | Spiriferid brachiopod. | |
| Hemithyris | H. navicula; H. diodonta; H. marginalis | Hemithiridid brachiopod. | |
| Pentamerus | P. lens; P. linguifera; P. galeatus | Pentamerid brachiopod. | |
| Orthis | O. turgida (?); O. davidsoni; O. elegantula; O. hybrida | Orthid brachiopod. | |
| Leptaena | L. transversalis; L. minima | Rafinesquinid brachiopod. | |
| Lingula | Lingula sp. | Lingulid brachiopod. | |
| Stegerhynchus | S. decemplicatus | Rhynchonellid brachiopod. | |
| Costistricklandia | C. lirata | Stricklandiid brachiopod. | |
| Eocoelia | E. curtisi | Athyridid brachiopod. | |
| Pterinea | P. retroflexa var. demissa | Pterineid brachiopod. | |
| Spirigerina | S. reticularis; S. marginalis | Brachiopod. | |
| Area | A. eastnori | Brachiopod. | |
| Cornulites | C. serpularius; C. serpuloides | Tentaculite lophotrochozoan. | |
| Euomphalus | E. funatus | Euomphalid gastropod. | |
| Orthoceras | O. annulatum | Orthoceratid cephalopod. | |
| Stenopora | S. fibrosa | Trepostomatid bryozoan. | |

=== Cnidaria ===
Cnidaria
| Genus | Species | Notes | Images |
|---|---|---|---|
| Favosites | F. gothlandicus; F. multipora | Favositid cnidarian. F. gothlandicus originally reported as F. gothlandica in Sedgwick (1853). | |
| Halysites | H. eatenulata | Hexacoral cnidarian. | |
| Petraia | P. bina | Hexacoral cnidarian. | |
| Palaeocyclus | P. porpita | Hexacoral cnidarian. | |

== See also ==
- List of fossiliferous stratigraphic units in England
