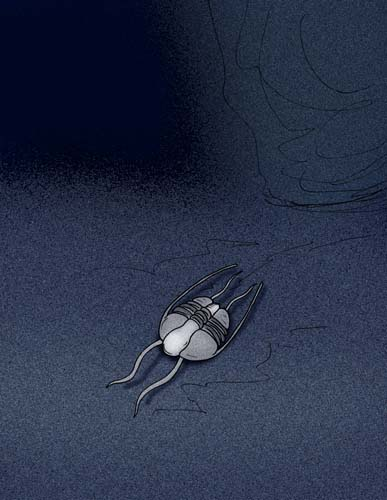
- N. levis

Scientific classification
- Kingdom: Animalia
- Phylum: Arthropoda
- Clade: †Artiopoda
- Class: †Trilobita
- Order: †Asaphida
- Family: †Raphiophoridae
- Genus: †Nanshanaspis; Zhang & Fan, 1960

Type species
- Nanshanaspis levis

Species
- N. levis Zhang and Fan, 1960; N. intermedia Zhang, 1988

= Nanshanaspis =

Nanshanaspis Temporal range: late Caradoc

Extinct genus of trilobites

Nanshanaspis is a genus of asaphid trilobites of the family Raphiophoridae that lived during the late Caradoc of Inner Mongolia, China. Like all raphiophorids it is blind, with a headshield (or cephalon) that is subsemicircular, carrying genal spines and a forward directed spine on the central raised area (or glabella), with the front of the glabella inflated and the natural fracture lines (or sutures) of the cephalon coinciding with its margin. It is easily distinguished from most other raphiophorids by the 3 thorax segments. Pseudampyxina, Taklamakania, and Kongqiaoheia also have only 3 such segments, while all other raphiophorid genera have at least 5 thorax segments, leading to the erection of the subfamily "Taklamakaniinae" to contain these four genera. "Taklamakaniinae" was dissolved and its members absorbed into Raphiophorinae when further study showed the close similarities the "taklamakaniids" had to the juvenile forms of various raphiophorinids. Specimens of Nanshanaspis, for example, closely resemble juveniles of Globampyx trinucleoides.

The primary difference between Nanshanaspis and Taklamakania is the presence of a long spine emanating from the glabellum of Taklamakania: Nanshanaspis differs from Pseudampyxina in the shape of the animals' respective glabella, and Nanshanaspis differs from Kongqiaoheia in both glabella variation, and in the structure of the genera's respective pygidia.
