= Brand Group =

Geologic group in Leicestershire, the United Kingdom

- Stratigraphic range: Cambrian 534.5–520 Ma
- Type: Group
- Unit of: Charnwood terrane
- Sub-units: Swithland Formation; Brand Hills Formation; Stable Pit Quartzarenite Member
- Overlies: Diorite unconformity; Maplewell Group
- Thickness: 355 m (1,164 ft)

Lithology
- Primary: Pelite
- Other: Quartzarenite, Greywacke, Breccia, Shale, Conglomerate

Location
- Region: Leicestershire
- Country: United Kingdom

The Brand Group is a geologic group in Leicestershire. It preserves Ichnotaxon dating back to the Cambrian period. It mainly contains pelites, with greywacke and breccia.

== Formation units ==
It is made up of two formations. Uppermost within the group is the Swithland Formation, consisting of purple pelites and fine greywackes, with thin discontinuous shale-pebble conglomerates at its base. This is underlain by the Brand Hills Formation, which consists of quartzarenite interbedded with pelite, greywackes and berrica.

In ascending stratigraphic order (lowest to highest):

- Swithland Formation
- Brand Hills Formation
  - Stable Pit Quartzarenite Member

== Dating ==
With the discovery of Teichichnus in the Swithland Formation, alongside several other ichnogenera, researchers have been able to confidentially date the Brand Group to the Lower Cambrian, which led to the group being taken out of the Charnian Supergroup, and has also led to the research and discovery of a major hiatus and diorite intrusion between this group and the underlying Maplewell Group, which is dated to the Ediacaran and correlates to other Avalon and White Sea assemblage groups. Using Zircon U-Pb dating, a date is returned of 603±2 Ma, suggesting the intrusion is Lower Edicaran in age.

== See also ==
- List of fossiliferous stratigraphic units in the United Kingdom
