= Brand Hills Formation =

Geologic formation in Leicestershire, the United Kingdom

- Stratigraphic range: Cambrian 534.5–532 Ma
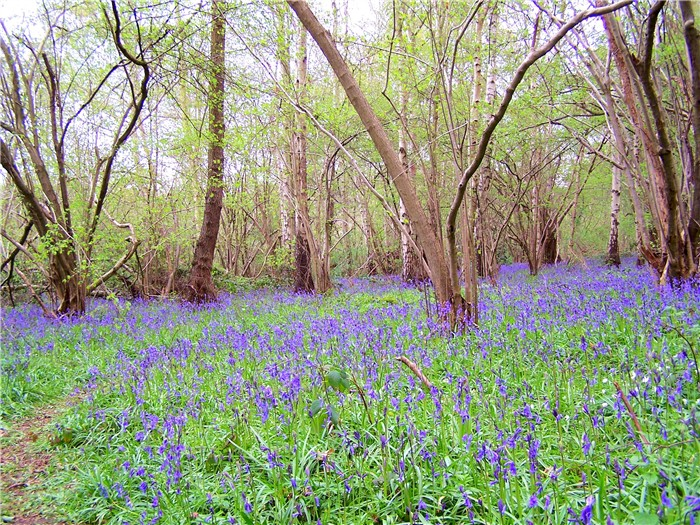
- Swithland Wood and The Brand, which gave the second half of its name to the formation, which itself can be found here.
- Type: Formation
- Unit of: Brand Group
- Sub-units: South Quarry Slump Breccia, Lubcloud Greywackes and Morley Lane Tuffs Members
- Underlies: Swithland Formation
- Overlies: Diorite Unconformity; Hanging Rocks Formation
- Thickness: 95 m (311 ft)

Lithology
- Primary: Quartzarenite
- Other: Pelite, Greywacke, Breccia

Location
- Region: Leicestershire
- Country: United Kingdom

Type section
- Named for: Swithland Wood and The Brand

The Brand Hills Formation is a geologic formation in Leicestershire, and lies within the wider Swithland Wood and The Brand area. It preserves an ichnotaxon dating back to the Cambrian period.

== Paleobiota ==
Whilst there isn't a lot within the Brand Hills Formation, it does mark the appearance of ichnogenera, which are usually attributed to burrowing organisms like marine annelids. In the case of this formation, only Arenicolites is known.

Color key
| Taxon | Reclassified taxon | Taxon falsely reported as present | Dubious taxon or junior synonym | Ichnotaxon | Ootaxon | Morphotaxon |

Notes
Uncertain or tentative taxa are in small text; ~~crossed out~~ taxa are discredited.

=== Ichnogenera ===
| Genus | Species | Notes | Images |
|---|---|---|---|
| Arenicolites | Arenicolites isp. | Burrows. | |

== See also ==
- List of fossiliferous stratigraphic units in the United Kingdom
