= Spirulina =

Spirulina may refer to:

== Biology ==
- Spirulina (genus), a genus of cyanobacteria (blue-green algae)
- Spirulina (dietary supplement), a cyanobacterium product and biomass that can be consumed by humans and other animals
  - Arthrospira, a genus of cyanobacteria closely related to the Spirulina genus, with three species that make up the above dietary supplement, despite its name
- Spirulina (suborder), a group of cephalopods
  - Spirula, the only extant member of that suborder

== See also ==
- Spiralinella, a genus of very small sea snails, pyramidellid gastropod mollusks, or micromollusks
- Spirolina, a genus of foraminifera in the family Peneroplidae
- Spirurina, a suborder of nematode worms
