= Malvern Quartzite =

Geologic formation in Worcestershire, the United Kingdom

- Stratigraphic range: early Cambrian; ~530 Ma
- Conglomerate facies of the Malvern Quartzite in The Gullet.
- Type: Formation
- Underlies: Hollybush Sandstone
- Overlies: Warren House Formation
- Thickness: ~50–300 ft (15–91 m)

Lithology
- Primary: Quartzite
- Other: Conglomerate

Location
- Region: Worcestershire
- Country: United Kingdom

Type section
- Named by: T. Groom
- Location: Midsummer Hill
- Year defined: 1902

The Malvern Quartzite, previously referred to as the Hollybush Quartzite and Conglomerate, is a Cambrian aged geologic formation in the Malvern Hills of Worcestershire. It is primarily composed of quartzites and conglomerates, and contains a sparse record of brachiopod fossils.

== History and naming ==
Before the formation was fully described and formally named in 1899 and 1902, the conglomerate rocks of the formation were found as far back as 1811 by the Scottish geologist Leonard Horner in the Gullet Pass area. Sometime later in 1839, feldspathic grit would be noted to be present in the Midsummer Hill area by Roderick Murchison. In 1849, John Phillips would record some more conglomerate rocks wrapping around and descending down the northern edge of Raggedstone Hill, towards Hollybush Pass to the North. This was later observed again by Holl in 1865 on the western side of Raggedstone Hill, as well as in Gullet Pass, although he would assign the occurrence in Gullet Pass to the Llandovery series. And in 1889, just 10 years before the first formal description and naming, William Samuel Symonds would also find more evidence of conglomerate rocks on the western and northern sides of Raggedstone Hill, including such rocks on the western side of Midsummer Hill also.

When it was formally described in 1899, the formation was originally referred to as the "Hollybush Quartzite and Conglomerate" or "Hollybush Conglomerate and Quartzite", commonly truncated to just "Hollybush Quartzite". The name would only remain for 3 years, when in 1902, Groom would see it formally renamed to the "Malvern Quartzite", as per a suggestion from Professor Charles Lapworth.

== Geology ==
The Malvern Quartzite is predominately composed of conglomerate rocks and quartzite, the namesake mineral of the formation. The quartzite is grey in colouration, ranging from compact to coarse-grained, with the cementing mineral being either silica or limonite. The conglomerate rocks are composed of few pebbles of a white milky quartz coated in a thin film of limonite, ranging from pea to hazel-nut sized, and are also predominately spherical to elongate in shape. Whilst the rock has been noted to understandably be primarily composed of clear, interlocking quartz crystals, of crystalline minerals have also been found, including feldspar, chalcedony, zircon, tourmaline, occasional glauconite, as well as apatite. The overall thickness of the formation remains uncertain due to difficulty in ascertaining the disposition of known beds, with outcrops at Winter Combe possibly measuring between 50–65 ft (15–20 m) in thickness, whilst conglomerate rocks at Midsummer Hill possibly range anywhere between 200–300 ft (61–91 m) in thickness.

== Dating ==
Whilst it has not been properly dated, the Malvern Quartzite has been correlated to other formations across Avalonia, including being correlated to the base of the Swithland Formation in Leicestershire, the Bonavista Formation in Newfoundland, the Striped Blue Shales in Wales, the Home Farm Member in Nuneaton, the Withycombe Formation also in Worcestershire, and the Lower Comley Sandstone in Shropshire. This roughly sees it dated to somewhere around 530 Ma.

== Paleobiota ==
The Malvern Quartzite contains a small collection of shelly fossils, namely brachiopods, such as Micromitra, and hyoliths such as Hyolithus.

Color key: Taxon / Reclassified taxon / Taxon falsely reported as present / Dubious taxon or junior synonym / Ichnotaxon / Ootaxon / Morphotaxon

Notes
Uncertain or tentative taxa are in small text
~~crossed out~~ taxa are discredited.

=== Lophotrochozoa ===
Lophotrochozoa
Genus	Species	Notes	Images
Hyolithus	H. fistula; H. primaevus	Hyolith.	
Kutorgina	K. cinyulata var. phillipsii	Kutorginid brachiopod.	
Micromitra	M. (Paterina) phillipsi; M. (Paterina) rhodesi	Paterinid brachiopod.	
Obolella	O. groomi	Obolellid brachiopod.	
Obolella	O. salteri	Obolellid brachiopod. Species would be reassigned to Broeggeria as B. salteri in 1902.	
Broeggeria	B. salteri	Elkaniid brachiopod.	
