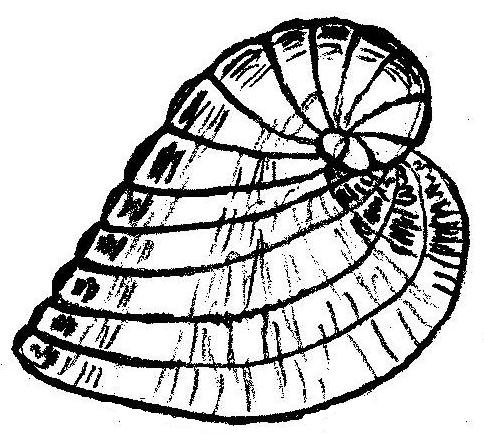
- Illustration of Peneroplis planatus

Scientific classification
- Domain: Eukaryota
- Clade: Diaphoretickes
- Clade: SAR
- Clade: Rhizaria
- Phylum: Retaria
- Subphylum: Foraminifera
- Class: Tubothalamea
- Order: Miliolida
- Suborder: Miliolina
- Superfamily: Soritoidea; Ehrenberg 1839

Families
- Keramosphaeridae Brady, 1884; †Meandropsinidae Henson, 1948; †Milioliporidae Brönnimann & Zaninetti, 1971; Peneroplidae Schultze, 1854; †Siphonoferidae Senowbari-Daryan & Zaninetti, 1986; Soritidae Ehrenberg, 1839

= Soritoidea =

Superfamily of protists

The Soritoidea is a group of miliolid benthic foraminifera with porcellaneous tests. They take on a variety of growth forms but typically have many chambers. Some soritids can grow over a centimeter across, huge for protists. All Soritoidea keep algal endosymbionts, which may be what allows them to achieve such large sizes. Some species have red algal symbionts, some have green algal symbionts, and others have dinoflagellate symbionts. These larger symbiont-bearing foraminifera are typically found in the oligotrophic waters of the tropics.

The species Marginopora vertebralis occupies similar habitats to reef-building corals and may have an ecological relationship with the corals, serving as an alternate host to the zooxanthellae, which sometimes get expelled by the corals under stressful conditions.
