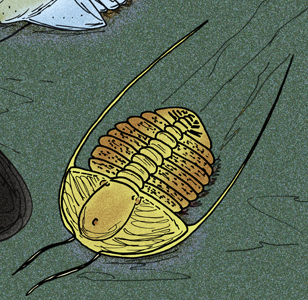
- P. graia

Scientific classification
- Domain: Eukaryota
- Kingdom: Animalia
- Phylum: Arthropoda
- Class: †Trilobita
- Order: †Asaphida
- Family: †Raphiophoridae
- Genus: †Pytine; Fortey, 1975

Type species
- Pytine graia Fortey, 1975

Species
- P. graia Fortey, 1975; P.? brevicauda (Wiman, 1905); P. corrugata Zhang & Zhou in Zhang, 1979; P. wirayasqa Vaccari, et al. 2006

Synonyms
- Ampyx brevicauda Wiman, 1905; Jiuxiella laevigata Liu in Zhou et al., 1977; Jiuxiella jiangxiensis Zhou et al., 2001; Miboshania corrugata Zhang & Zhou in Zhang, 1979

= Pytine =

Pytine Temporal range: Early to Late Arenig

Extinct genus of trilobites

Pytine is an extinct genus of asaphid trilobites. Species lived during the later part of the Arenig stage of the Ordovician Period, approximately 478 to 471 million years ago. Various species are found in the Svalbard, Valhallfonna Formation, Olenidsletta, Member, of Spitzbergen, Norway, the Megistaspis (Paramegistaspis) planilimbata Zone of the 'Shumardia Shale' of Sweden, Jujuy Province, Argentina, early Arenig-aged strata of Jiangxi province, China, and Darriwilian-aged strata in Western Hunan province, China. The type species, P. graia, has seven thorax segments, and lacks the rapier-like glabellar spine, that occurs in many other raphiophorids. The Chinese species, by contrast, have only six thoracic segments. So far, only the type species, and one of the Chinese species, P. laevigata (synonym= Jiuxiella laevigata), are known from complete specimens.

== Species and synonymy ==
Richard Fortey erected the genus in 1975 upon describing P. graia from Spitzbergen. In 1999, Hoel subjectively synonymized a Swedish species of Ampyx, A. brevicauda, into Pytine. The Chinese raphiophorid genera Jiuxiella and Miboshania were noted to be anatomically similar to P. graia, and were merged into Pytine, as well. In 2006, N. E. Vaccari described P. wirayasqa from several fragments from the early Arenig-aged Acoite Formation, of La Ciénaga, Jujuy province, Argentina, together with specimens of another related raphiophorid genus, Lehnertia.

== Etymology ==
Pytine is derived from an Ancient Greek word for a wineflask with wattles, referring to the shape and wrinkled texture of the glabellum.
