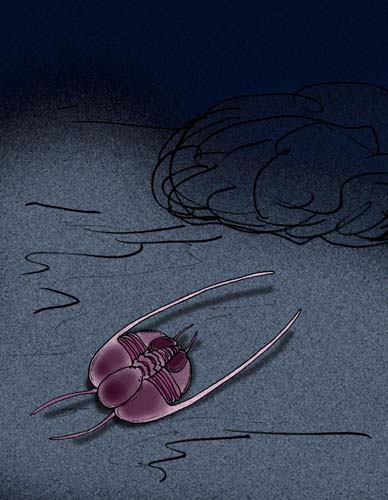
- Kongqiaoheia rotundata

Scientific classification
- Kingdom: Animalia
- Phylum: Arthropoda
- Clade: †Artiopoda
- Class: †Trilobita
- Order: †Asaphida
- Family: †Raphiophoridae
- Genus: †Kongqiaoheia; Zhang, 1988

Type species
- Kongqiaoheia rotundata

Species
- Kongqiaoheia rotundata; Kongqiaoheia sarytumensis

= Kongqiaoheia =

Kongqiaoheia Temporal range: late Caradoc

Extinct genus of trilobites

Kongqiaoheia is a genus of asaphid trilobites of the family Raphiophoridae. Kongqiaoheia rotundata lived during the late Caradoc of Inner Mongolia, China. K. rotundata was originally grouped with the so-called Taklamakaniinae, a paraphyletic group of tiny, dwarfed raphiophorids that lived in a deepwater environment in what is now the Tarim Basin, including Pseudampyxina, Nanshanaspis, and Taklamakania. Like these other genera, K. rotundata has only three thoracic segments, probably due to paedomorphic dwarfism: other raphiophorid trilobites have at minimum five thoracic segments.

== Morphology ==
As with other "taklamakaniids," K. rotundata had a disk-shaped body with a semi-circular cephalon, a bulbous glabellum, and a pair of very long, thin, librigenial spines emanating from the lateral corners of the cephalon. There are a pair of bulbous structures on the pygidium. K. rotundata differs from Taklamakania by lacking a spine on the anterior of the glabellum. It differs from Nanshanaspis in the shapes of the cephalon, glabellum, pygidium and the various glabellal and pygidial furrows. K. rotundata differs from Pseudampyxina in that the former's glabellum does not protrude anteriorially as the latter's.
