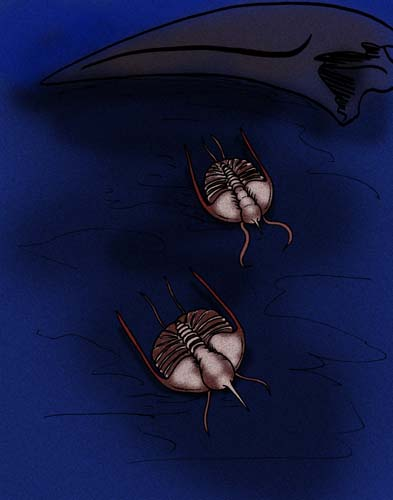
- T. tarimensis

Scientific classification
- Kingdom: Animalia
- Phylum: Arthropoda
- Clade: †Artiopoda
- Class: †Trilobita
- Order: †Asaphida
- Family: †Raphiophoridae
- Genus: †Taklamakania; Zhang, 1979

Type species
- Taklamakania tarimensis

Species
- T. tarimensis; T. tarimheensis; T. xinjiangensis

= Taklamakania =

Taklamakania Temporal range: late Caradoc

Extinct genus of trilobites

Taklamakania is a genus of asaphid trilobites of the family Raphiophoridae that lived during the late Caradoc of Inner Mongolia, China. Like all raphiophorids it is blind, with a headshield (or cephalon) that is subsemicircular, carrying genal spines and a forward directed spine on the central raised area (or glabella), with the front of the glabella inflated and the natural fracture lines (or sutures) of the cephalon coinciding with its margin. It is easily distinguished from most other raphiophorids by the 3 thorax segments. Pseudampyxina, Nanshanaspis, and Kongqiaoheia also have only 3 such segments, but all three lack the frontal spine that emanates from the glabellum of Taklamakania species. All other raphiophorid genera have at least 5 thorax segments. Three species, T. tarimensis, T. tarimheensis, and T. xinjiangensis, have been assigned to this genus so far.

== Etymology ==
The generic name Taklamakania refers to the Taklamakan Desert, the area where its fossils were found. The species epithet tarimensis is also a geographic derivation in reference to the Tarim Basin, which includes the Taklamakan Desert.

== Evolution ==
Adult T. tarimensis are almost indistinguishable from juvenile Ampyxina powelli, and it is assumed that Taklamakania developed from Ampyxina through paedomorphosis.

== Junior homonym ==
- T. lepetzi = Paranemia bicolor (Ferrer & Yvinec, 2004) a tenebrionid beetle
