= Hollybush Sandstone =

Geologic formation in Worcestershire, the United Kingdom

- Stratigraphic range: early Cambrian; ~530–520 Ma
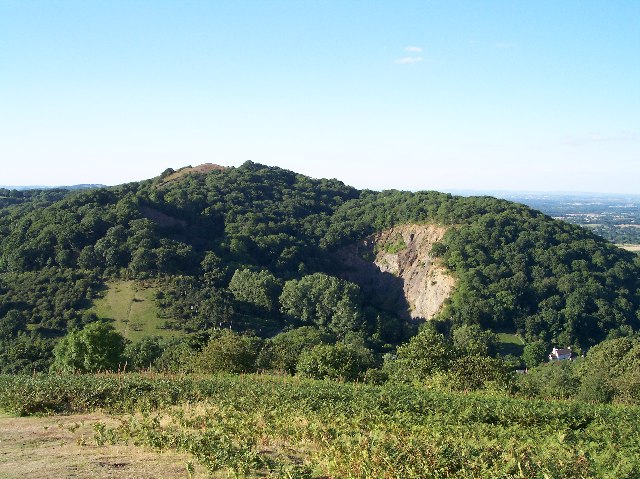
- Hollybush Hill, with Hollybush Quarry visible in the centre, the locality after which the formation is named.
- Type: Formation
- Underlies: (Unconformably) White Leaved Oak Shale; Upper Llandovery limestone
- Overlies: Malvern Quartzite
- Thickness: ~1,000 ft (305 m)

Lithology
- Primary: Sandstone

Location
- Region: Worcestershire
- Country: United Kingdom

Type section
- Named for: Hollybush Quarry
- Location: Hollybush Quarry

The Hollybush Sandstone, locally referred to as the "Greensand" or "Greenstone", is a Cambrian aged geologic formation in the Malvern Hills of Worcestershire. It is primarily composed of sandstones, and contains a sparse record of shelly fossils.

== Geology ==
The Hollybush Sandstone, which is unconformably overlain by the White Leaved Oak Shale, and underlain by the Malvern Quartzite, is primarily composed of soft, fine-grained micaceous sandstone, which is notably pale olive-green in colouration, giving the formation its local names of "Greensand" and "Greenstone". The sandstone is noted to weather quickly, turning a distinctive brownish colour, primarily due to the presence of hydrated ferric oxides, alongside occasional manganese oxides which form visible black bands along bedding-planes within the rock. There is also a presence of detrital muscovite, with the primary rocks noted to be studded with the minerals.

At other localities, such as in Winter Combe, the rock is noted to be more shaly to loosely cemented in nature, with a brown to dull-green colouration, which weathers to a rich brown. This has been compared to highly ferruginous sandstones.

== Dating ==
Whilst it has not been properly dated, the Hollybush Sandstone has been correlated to other formations across Avalonia, including being correlated to the roughly the middle of the Swithland Formation in Leicestershire, the Purely Shale in Nuneaton, the Brigus Formation in Newfoundland, and the Pen-y-Bryn Grit, the Motted Blue Slates, and Green Slates of Nantlle in North Wales. This roughly sees it dated to somewhere between 530 – 520 Ma, or Stage 2 of the Cambrian.

== Paleobiota ==
The Hollybush Sandstone contains a small collection of shelly fossils, namely brachiopods, such as Micromitra and Kutorgina, as well as hyoliths, such as Hyolithus. Alongside this, it also contains sparse annelid records, such as Scolecoderma. Casts of unknown foraminifera can also be found in the formation.

Color key
Taxon	Reclassified taxon	Taxon falsely reported as present	Dubious taxon or junior synonym	Ichnotaxon	Ootaxon	Morphotaxon

Notes
Uncertain or tentative taxa are in small text; ~~crossed out~~ taxa are discredited.

=== Lophotrochozoa ===
Lophotrochozoa
Genus	Species	Notes	Images
Hyolithus	Hyolithus sp.; H. fistula; H. malvernensis; H. primaevus	Hyolith.	
Kutorgina	K. cinyulata var. phillipsii	Kutorginid brachiopod.	
Linnarssonia	L. sayittalis	Lingulate brachiopod.	
Lingula (?)	L. (?) squamosa	Lingulid brachiopod. Known fragments likely to be Kutorgina instead.	
Modiolopsis (?)	Modiolopsis (?) sp.	Mytiloid bivalve.	
Micromitra	M. (Paterina) phillipsi	Paterinid brachiopod.	
Obodella (?)	O. (?) salteri	Obolellid brachiopod. Species would be reassigned to Broeggeria as B. salteri in 1902.	
Broeggeria	B. salteri	Elkaniid brachiopod.	

=== Annelida ===
Annelida
Genus	Species	Notes	Images
Scolecoderma	S. antiquissima	Annelid worm.	

=== Incertae sedis ===
Incertae sedis
Genus	Species	Notes	Images
Coleoloides (?)	Coleoloides (?) sp.	Small shelly fossil of unknown affinites.	

=== Ichnogenera ===
Ichnogenera
Genus	Species	Notes	Images
Skolithos	Skolithos sp.	Burrows. Reported under its former name of Scolithus in Groom 1902.	
