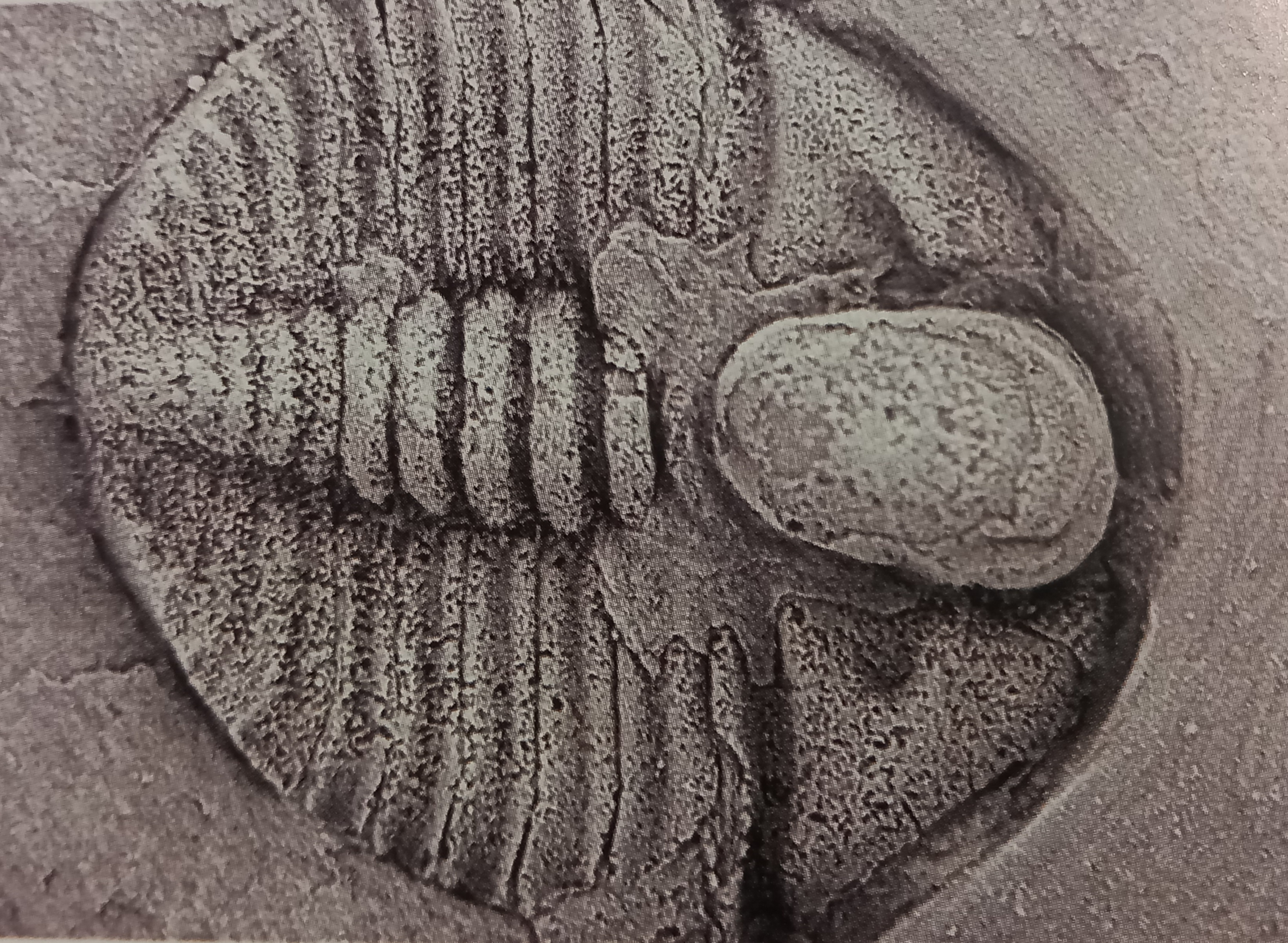
- Damghanampyx from the Lashkark Formation of Damghan, Iran

Scientific classification
- Kingdom: Animalia
- Phylum: Arthropoda
- Clade: †Artiopoda
- Class: †Trilobita
- Order: †Asaphida
- Family: †Raphiophoridae
- Genus: †Damghanampyx; Ghobadi Pour, Vidal & Hosseini-Nezhad, 2007
- Species: †D. ginteri

Binomial name
- †Damghanampyx ginteri Ghobadi Pour, Vidal & Hosseini-Nezhad, 2007

= Damghanampyx =

Damghanampyx Temporal range: 485.4–470.0 Ma

Extinct genus of trilobites

Damghanampyx is an extinct genus of trilobites in the family Raphiophoridae. It has been reported from the Ordovician period of Iran. The generic name Damghanampix is a compound crassis word taking the city of Damghan in Semnan province of Iran as a prefix to Ampyx.

== Description ==
Damghanampix had a simple cephalon and a large and prominent glabella, which distinguished itself from all other trilobites.
