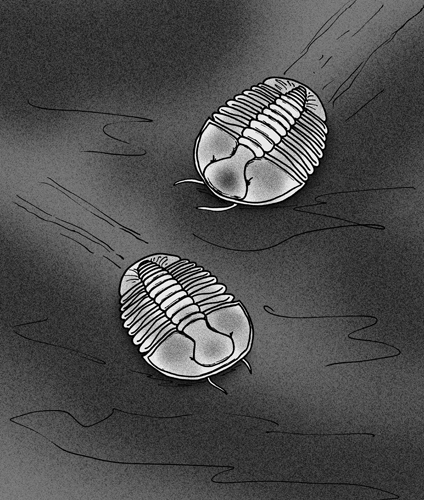
- Typhlokorynetes plana

Scientific classification
- Kingdom: Animalia
- Phylum: Arthropoda
- Clade: †Artiopoda
- Class: †Trilobita
- Order: †Asaphida
- Family: †Raphiophoridae
- Genus: †Typhlokorynetes
- Species: †T. plana

Binomial name
- †Typhlokorynetes plana (Raymond, 1937)

Synonyms
- Warburgella plana Raymond, 1937; Raymondaspis (in part)

= Typhlokorynetes =

Typhlokorynetes Temporal range: Early Tremadocian

Extinct species of trilobite

Typhlokorynetes plana is a species of small, button-shaped asaphid trilobites of the family Raphiophoridae that lived during the Early Tremadocian of Vermont, United States.

== Etymology ==
The generic epithet is a compound word of the Greek words "Typhlos," meaning "blind," and "Korynetes," which means "club-bearer," in reference to the animal's eyeless state, and the glabellum that is shaped in the outline of a club or bowling pin. The specific name "plana" refers to the flattened nature of the body.

== History of taxonomy ==
The first fossils of this trilobite were described by P. E. Raymond in 1937 as a blind proetid that he named "Warburgella" plana. In 1959, "W." plana would be redescribed by H. B. Whittington as a species of Raymondaspis in the family Styginidae. Alan Shaw voiced a similar opinion when he moved it into its own genus and family, Typhlokorynetes in Typhlokorynetidae, in that it maybe a specialized styginid with unusual or aberrant sutures and hypostome anatomy. During the 1970s, it was then reappraised as a relative of Endymion in Raphiophoridae.

== Occurrence ==
Specimens are known from the Highgate Formation in northwestern Vermont.
