= Warren House Formation (Worcestershire) =

Geologic formation in Worcestershire, the United Kingdom

- Stratigraphic range: late Ediacaran; ~569–566 Ma
- Type: Formation
- Unit of: Wrekin terrane
- Underlies: Malvern Quartzite
- Overlies: (Tectonic contact) Malvern complex
- Area: 0.5 km^{2} (0.19 sq mi)

Lithology
- Primary: Basalt
- Other: Tuff, Volcanic rock, Pyroclastic rock

Location
- Region: Worcestershire
- Country: United Kingdom

Type section
- Location: Broad Down

The Warren House Formation, previously referred to as the Warren House Group or Warren House Series, is an Ediacaran aged geologic formation in the Malvern Hills of Worcestershire, and sits within the wider Wrekin terrane of southern England. It is primarily composed of basalts and volcanic rocks.

== Geology ==
The Warren House Formation overlies the metamorphosed Malvern complex, noted to be in tectonic contact with it and considerably less deformed that it, whilst it underlies the Cambrian aged Malvern Quartzite. It is predominately composed of spilitic basalt lavas, pillow basalts, altered intermediate lavas, alerted rhyolitic lavas, as well as felsic pyroclastic rocks. The basaltic rocks have been noted to bear similarities with tholeiitic basalts formed in primitive oceanic island-arcs and back-arc basins, with the basalt of the Warren House Formation likely being deposited from an eruption on an oceanic marginal basin, although other researchers discount this, instead noting that the eruptions that created the basalts likely occurred in within releasing bends along strike-slip faults. Within the basaltic rock of Reservoir Quarry can be found inter-bedded basalts, crystal-lithic tuffs, composed of rhyolites.

== Dating ==
Exposed rocks of the Warren House Formation have been dated using U–pd dating on several zircon samples collected from the Broad Down area in the Malvern Hills. It has been noted that prior to the first formal dating in 1991, the Warren House Formation had been presumed to be Precambrian in age, based on pebbles collected from the overlying Cambrian aged Malvern Quartzite, as well as the overlying Hollybush Sandstones containing fossil material from the Cambrian. The collected zircon samples yielded a date of 566±2 Ma, confirming the Ediacaran age of the formation. It has since been noted that this likely means that the eruptions that formed the basalts and volcanic rocks of the Warren House Formation happened rather late in the history and formation of the wider Avalonian arc system.

The formation has also been correlated to various other Ediacaran formations of a similar age in England, which includes the Coomb Volcanic Formation in Wales, the Stretton Formation in Long Mynd, the Uriconian Volcanics of the Wrekin and Stretton Hills, as well as the lower layers of the Beacon Hill Formation and upper layers of the Blackbrook Reservoir Formation in Leicestershire.
