= Lotagnostus =

Lotagnostus Temporal range: Upper Cambrian (upper Sunwaptan)

Scientific classification
- Kingdom: Animalia
- Phylum: Arthropoda
- Clade: †Artiopoda
- Class: †Trilobita (?)
- Order: †Agnostida
- Family: †Agnostidae
- Genus: †Lotagnostus; Whitehouse, 1936

Species
- L. americanus Billings, 1860; L. asiaticus Troedsson, 1937; L. attenuatus Rusconi, 1955; L. clarki Taylor, Loch & Repetski, 2024; L. ergoides Shergold, 1972; L. germanicus Matthew, 1901; L. hedeni Troedsson, 1937; L. irretinus Shergold, 1975; L. matthewi Westrop & Landing, 2017; L. morrisoni Taylor, Loch & Repetski, 2024; L. obscurus Palmer, 1955; L. peladensis Rusconi, 1951; L. punctuatus Lu, 1964; L. salteri Westrop & Landing, 2017; L. spectabilis? Xiang & Zhang, 1985; L. trisectus Salter, 1864 (type)

Synonyms
- Agnostus americanus - synonym of L. americanus; Agnostus hedeni - synonym of L. hedeni; Agnostus trisectus - synonym of L. trisectus; Agnostus trisectus germanicus - synonym of L. germanicus; Lotagnostus spectabilis? - synonym of L asiaticus

Extinct genus of trilobites

Lotagnostus is a genus of very small trilobites in the order Agnostida, which lived on the outer continental shelves worldwide, during the late Upper Cambrian. It was described by Whitehouse in 1936, and the type species is Lotagnostus trisectus, which was originally described as a species of Agnostus by Salter in 1864.

== Taxonomy ==
The Treatise on Invertebrate Paleontology divides Lotagnostus into three subgenera that differ in the degree of effacement: L. (Lotagnostus) Whitehouse, 1936 (neither cephalon nor pygidium strongly effaced), L. (Distagnostus) Shergold, 1972 (strongly effaced on the outer/dorsal surface, but with clear furrows on the inner/ventral surface and L. (Eolotagnostus) Zhou in Zhiqiang Zhou, li & Qu, 1982 (with even the inner/ventral surface strongly effaced). Later authors however consider it likely that creating these subgenera would render the nominate subgenus paraphyletic.

== Biostratographic significance ==
The first appearance datum (FAD) of Lotagnostus americanus has been proposed to define the lower limit of Cambrian Stage 10. This proposition is based on the interpretation that L. americanus is a polymorph species with a global distribution, a concept that included L. obscurus, and Agnostus trisectus, the type of Lotagnostus. Recently however, the North American species of Lotagnostus have been revised and it was concluded that L. americanus in fact shows little variation and has a limited spatial distribution, and the variants from other locations belong to several other Lotagnostus species. This renders L. americanus unfit as index fossil for the lower limit of Cambrian Stage 10. As alternatives the FADs of the conodonts Cordylodus andresi and Eoconodontus notchpeakensis have been suggested.

== Distribution ==
- L. trisectus is known from the late Upper Cambrian of Canada (MacNeil Brook, Middle Chesley Drive Group, Nova Scotia), England (White Leaved Oak Shale, Whiteleaved Oak, Herefordshire), Wales (Cwmhesgen Formation) and Sweden (Andrarum).
- L. americanus occurs at the late Upper Cambrian of Canada (in boulders in conglomerates of the Léwis Formation, North Ridge, near Léwis, Quebec).
- L. asiaticus has been found in the late Upper Cambrian of China (Kuruktagh, Xinjiang)
- L. germanicus is known from the late Upper Cambrian of Canada (North shore of East Bay, near Eskasoni, Cape Breton Island, Middle Chesley Drive Group, Nova Scotia)
- L. hedeni occurs at the late Upper Cambrian of China (Kuruktagh, Xinjiang; Siyangshan Formation, western Zhejiang), Kazakhstan (Euloma limitaris-Taoyuania zone) and Canada (Phylacterus saylesi fauna, Shallow Bay Formation, western Newfoundland)
- L. obscurus is present in the late Upper Cambrian of the United States (Pogonip Limestone, Windfall Formation, near Hamburg Shaft, Eureka District, Nevada))
- L. peladensis is known from the late Upper Cambrian of Argentina (Precordillera)
- L. punctuatus has been found in the late Upper Cambrian of China (Zejiang; elsewhere in Southeastern China) and Kazakhstan.

Lotagnostus is also present in Siberia (Ogon'or Formation along the Khos-Negele River), but its assignment to a particular species is difficult.

== Description ==
Like all Agnostida, Lotagnostus is diminutive, with the headshield (or cephalon) and tailshield (or pygidium) of approximately the same size (or isopygous) and outline. Like all Agnostina, Lotagnostus has only two thorax segments. The species are characterized by variable stages of effacement, more so on the outer/dorsal surface compared to the inner/ventral surface. This may complicate distinction from effaced species in other genera. The frontal lobe the central raised area of the cephalon (or glabella) is long at about 1/3 or more of the length of the glabella. The basal lobes at the rear of the glabella are narrow triangular and equal in length to the frontal lobe. The central part of the glabella has two side lobes. Opposite the tip of the side lobes there is a node on the midline. There is a furrow at midline connecting the glabella with the border furrow. The axis of the pygidium (or rhachis) has three sections. The frontal section is split into three parts. Both lateral parts are defined by furrows on all sides: those with the central section directed backward and very slightly outward, those with the middle section outward and slightly backward, and those with the pleural zone backward and slightly inward. The middle part is merged with the central section. The middle part carries a node. The furrow between the central and rear parts is transverse, and those with the pleural zone backward and slightly inward. The rear part is about twice as long as the frontal and central parts individually. The surrounding axial furrow is directed outward, then strongly bends backward and then curves regularly ever more inward. Over the posterior 2/3 of the rear part a strip about as wide as the node on the central part may be discernible, which ends in a node that at the very rear of the rhachis. The distance between the rhachis and the border furrow (or post axial length) is about equal to 1/4 of the rhachis. The pygidial border is about 1/8 of the rhachis. Opposite to the rear of the rhachis the border may carry a small spine at each side.
