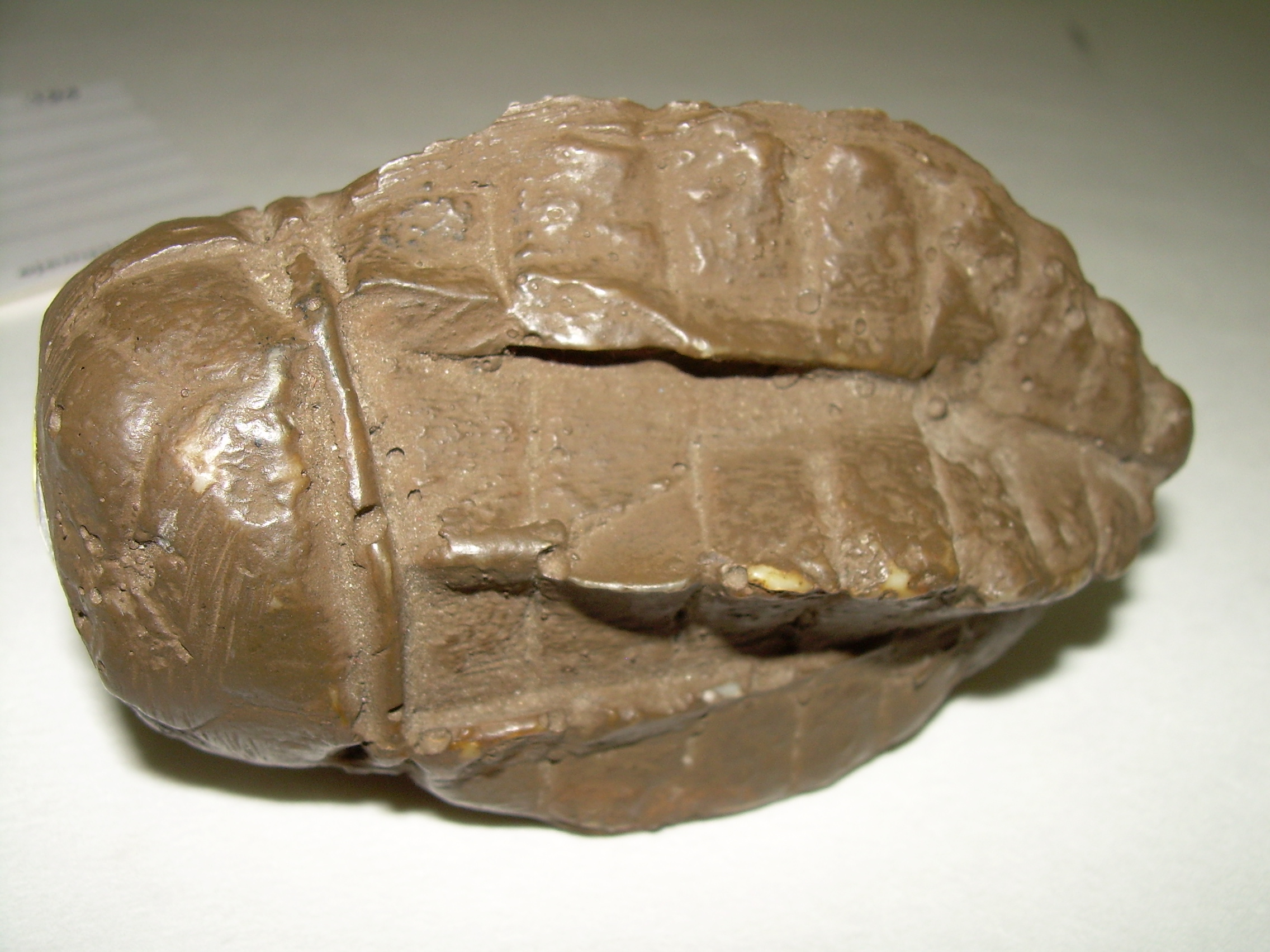
- Cupressocrinus sp.

Scientific classification
- Kingdom: Animalia
- Phylum: Echinodermata
- Class: Crinoidea
- Parvclass: Cladida
- Superfamily: †Gasterocomacea; Roemer (1854)

Families
- Cupressocrinitidae; Petalocrinidae

= Gasterocomacea =

Gasterocomacea Temporal range: Middle Devonian–Late Devonian

Extinct superfamily of crinoids

Gasterocomacea is an extinct superfamily of crinoids from the Middle to Late Devonian.
