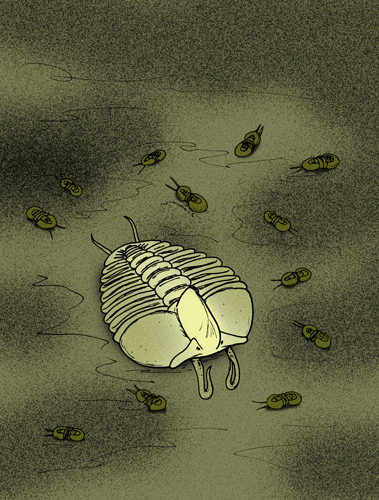

Scientific classification
- Kingdom: Animalia
- Phylum: Arthropoda
- Clade: †Artiopoda
- Class: †Trilobita
- Order: †Asaphida
- Family: †Raphiophoridae
- Genus: †Carinocranium; Dean, 1989
- Species: †C. cariniferum

Binomial name
- †Carinocranium cariniferum Dean, 1989

= Carinocranium =

Carinocranium Temporal range: Early Tremadocian

Genus of trilobites

Carinocranium cariniferum is a species of asaphid trilobites of the family Raphiophoridae that lived during the Early Tremadocian of Alberta, Canada. It is known only from a cranidium with a large, keel-shaped glabellum.

== Etymology ==
The generic and specific epithets both refer to the massive, keel-shaped glabellum, thus the use of the Latin prefix "carina", so that the generic epithet translates as "keel-cranium," and the specific epithet translating as "keel bearing."

== Occurrence ==
The only known specimen, specimen GSC 62139, is found in the Early Tremadocian-aged GSC Locality 92293, 168.5 meters above the Outram Formation, Alberta, Canada.
