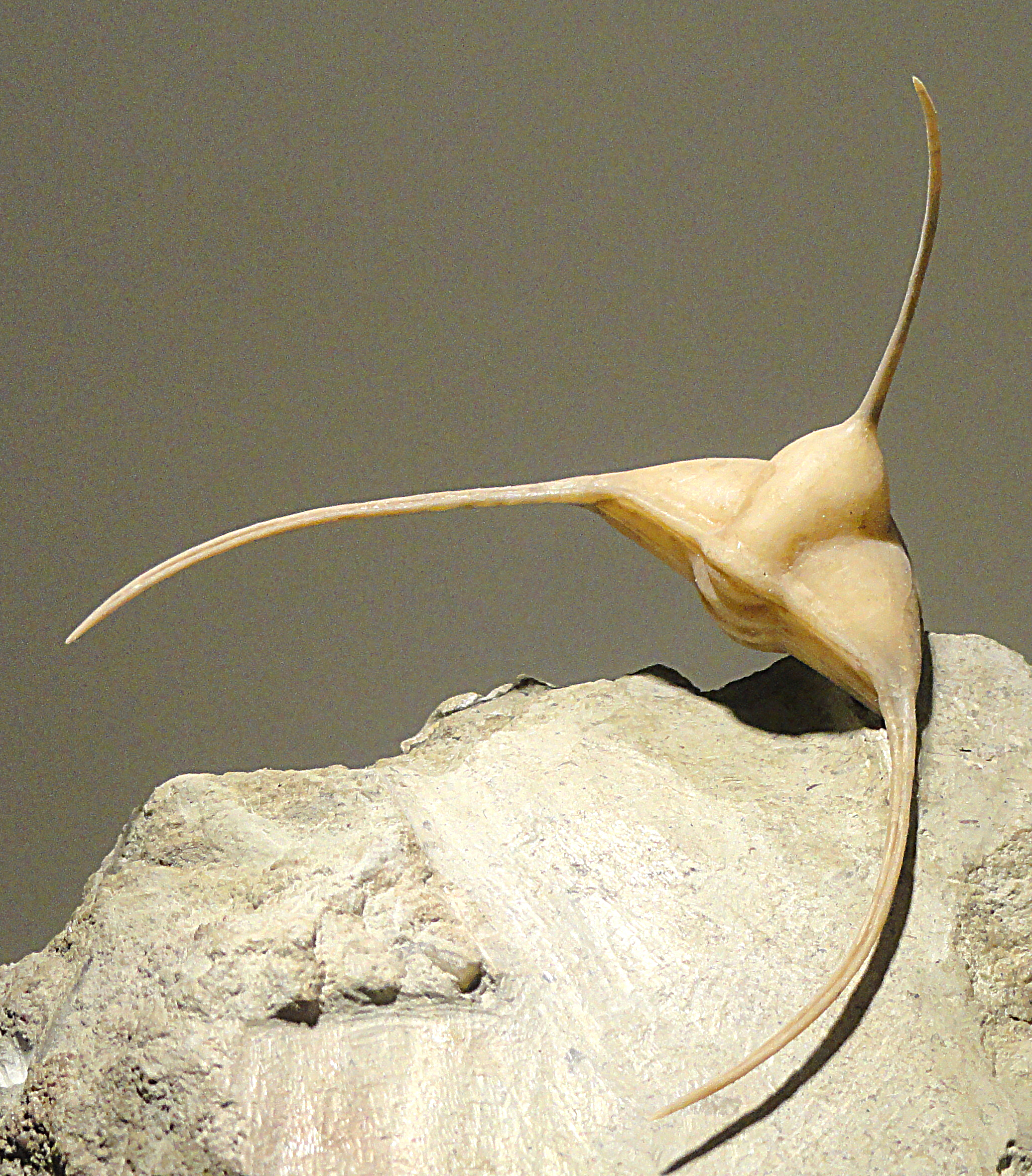
- Curled Ampyx nasutus showing the cephalon, genal spines & glabellar spine

Scientific classification
- Kingdom: Animalia
- Phylum: Arthropoda
- Clade: †Artiopoda
- Class: †Trilobita
- Order: †Asaphida
- Superfamily: †Trinucleioidea
- Family: †Raphiophoridae; Angelin, 1854

Subfamilies
- Raphiophorinae Angelin, 1854; Endymioniinae Raymond, 1920; see text for genera

Synonyms
- Subfamilies; Ampyxininae; Ampyxinellinae; Taklamakaniinae; Typhlokorynetidae

= Raphiophoridae =

Raphiophoridae Temporal range: Ordovician to Middle Silurian

Extinct family of trilobites

Raphiophoridae is a family of small to average-sized trilobites that first occurred at the start of the Ordovician and became extinct at the end of the Middle Silurian.

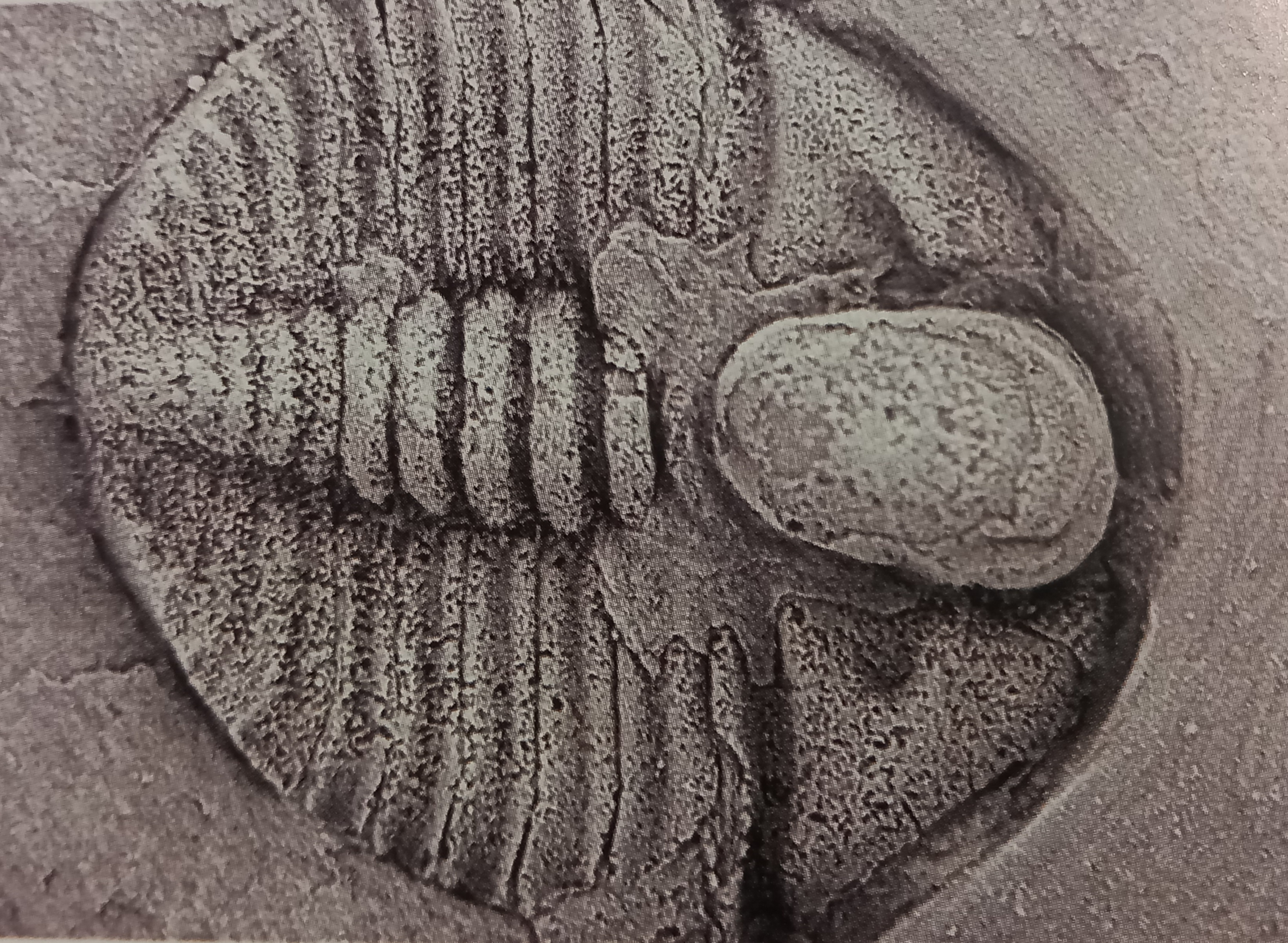
Damghanampyx ghobadipour fossil from Lashkark Formation, Ordovician, Damghan, Iran

== Anatomy ==
All raphiophorids are blind, with headshields (or cephalons) that are triangular to subcircular, and many carry long, trailing genal spines, a forward-directed rapier-like spine on the central raised area (or glabella), or both, with the glabella often inflated and the natural fracture lines (or sutures) of the cephalon coinciding with its margin. The thorax typically has five to seven segments (except for the genera Taklamakania, Pseudampyxina, Nanshanaspis, and Kongqiangheia, which have only 3). As mentioned before, all raphiophorids are blind. Many, if not most, genera have no eyes whatsoever, though a few, such as Lehnertia, have vestigial tubercles that correspond to the compound eyes of their ancestors.

== Distribution ==
Raphiophoridae currently includes two officially recognized subfamilies. The nominal subfamily Raphiophorinae originated from the Upper Tremadocian and died out during the Lower Ludlow, and has 217 species assigned to it divided over 26 genera. The subfamily Endymioniinae occurred from the Floian or possibly from the Lower Tremadocian to the Upper Katian and contains 36 species in 13 genera. The time of the first occurrence depends on whether the inadequately known monotypic genus Typhlokorynetes from the Lower Tremadocian of Laurentia is considered an endymioniin. Raphiophorids are generally found in deep-water sediments, and have a cosmopolitan distribution from the Floian to the Ordovician–Silurian extinction events with diversity peaking from the Darriwilian to the Sandbian. Raphiophorus survived into the Silurian.

== Taxonomy ==
The subfamily Taklamakaniinae was erected to bring together the genera Nanshanaspis, Pseudampyxina, and Taklamakania, (and then, later, Kongqiangheia) on the basis that they all have only three thoracic segments. Analysis of adult anatomy of these genera and larval stages of other raphiophorids showed they most probably developed through paedomorphosis from three different ancestors, so provide an example of parallel evolution. Nanshanaspis closely resembles young Globampyx, Pseudampyxina strongly looks like juvenile Raymondella, and Taklamakania is almost identical to early stages of Ampyxina. Since the three genera of the Taklamakaniinae have been demonstrated to be unrelated to each other, this subfamily is regarded as polyphyletic, and has been synonymized with the Raphiophorinae.

=== Genera ===
These genera are assigned to the Raphiophoridae:

Subfamily Raphiophorinae

- Raphiophorus Angelin, 1854
- Ampyx Dalman, 1827
- Ampyxella Dean, 1960
- Ampyxina Ulrich, 1922
- Ampyxoides Whittington, 1965
- Bulbaspis Chugaeva, 1956
- Cnemidopyge Whittard, 1955
- Damghanampyx Ghobadi Pour, Vidal & Hosseini-Nezhad, 2007
- Edmundsonia Cooper, 1953
- Globampyx Fortey, 1975
- Kongqiaoheia Zhang, 1988
- Lonchodomas Angelin, 1854
- Mendolaspis Rusconi, 1951
- Nanshanaspis Chang & Fan, 1960
- Pseudampyxina Ju, 1983
- Raymondella Reed, 1935
- Rhombampyx Fortey, 1975
- Taklamakania Zhang, 1980

Subfamily Endymioniinae

- Endymionia Billings, 1865
- Ampyxinella Koroleva, 1959
- Ampyxinops Zhang 1979
- Anisonotella Whittington, 1965
- Carinocranium Dean, 1989
- Edmundsonia Cooper 1953
- Jiuxiella Zhou et al. 1977
- Lehnertia Vaccari, et al, 2006
- Malongullia Webby, Moors & McLean, 1970
- Miaopopsis Lu et al. 1965, synonym = Sinampyxina
- Miboshania Zhang 1979
- Pytine Fortey, 1975
- Salteria Thomson, 1864
- ? Tarimella W. T. Zhang 1979 (may be a shumardiid ptychopariid)
- Typhlokorynetes Shaw, 1966
