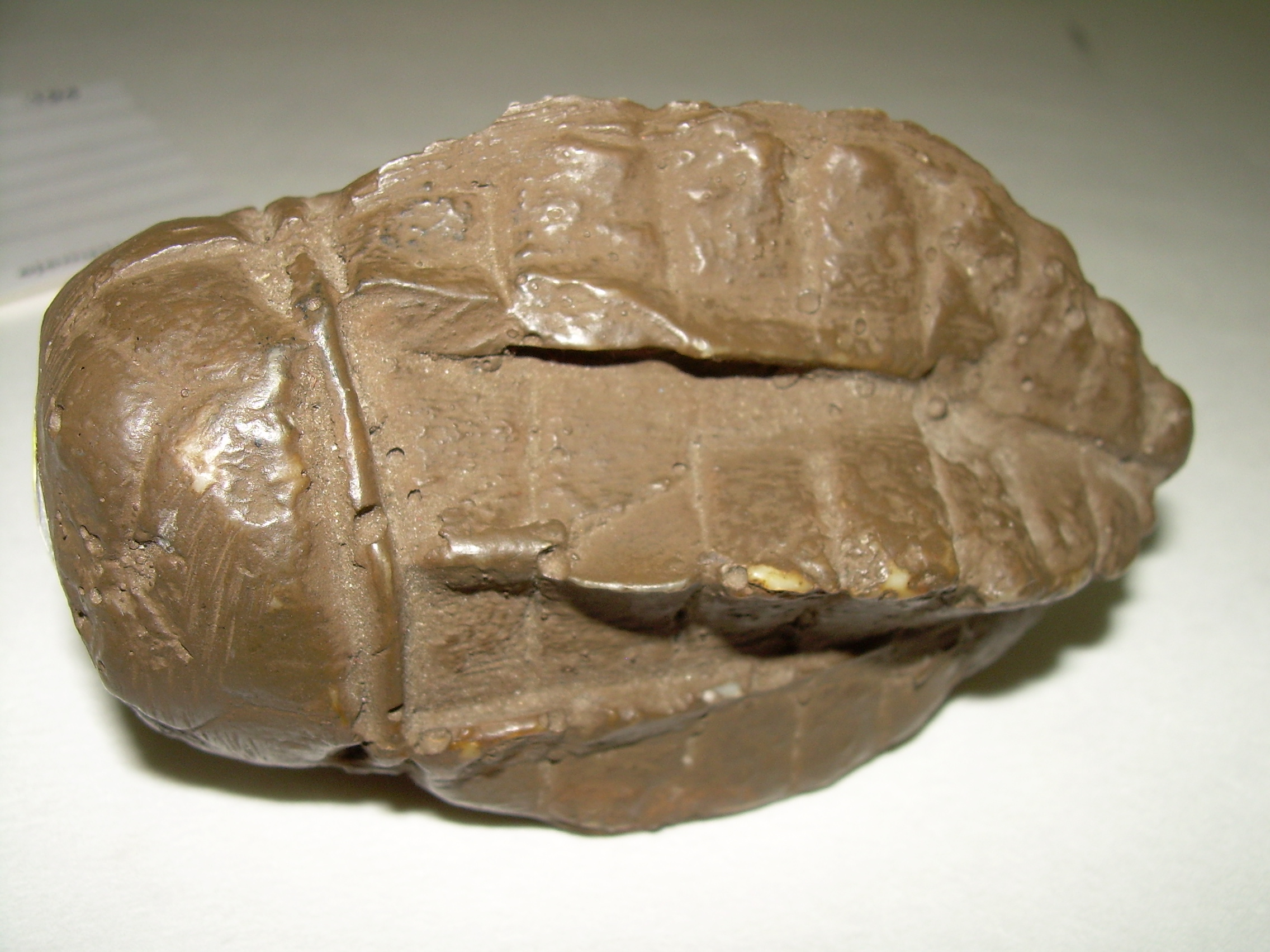
- Cupressocrinus sp.

Scientific classification
- Kingdom: Animalia
- Phylum: Echinodermata
- Class: Crinoidea
- Superfamily: †Gasterocomacea
- Family: †Cupressocrinitidae; C.F. Roemer, 1854

Subfamilies
- Cupressocrinitinae; Rhopalocrininae

= Cupressocrinitidae =

Cupressocrinitidae Temporal range: Middle Devonian–Late Devonian

Extinct family of crinoids

Cupressocrinitidae is an extinct family of crinoid from the Middle to Late Devonian. Cupressocrinites is a representative of this family.
