= Mendolaspis =

Mendolaspis Temporal range: Arenig

Scientific classification
- Domain: Eukaryota
- Kingdom: Animalia
- Phylum: Arthropoda
- Class: †Trilobita
- Order: †Asaphida
- Family: †Raphiophoridae
- Genus: †Mendolaspis; Rusconi, 1951

Type species
- Mendolaspis salagastensis

Species
- M. doidyx; M. salagastensis

Extinct genus of trilobites

Mendolaspis is an extinct genus of trilobites. It lived during the Arenig stage of the Ordovician Period, approximately 478 to 471 million years ago.
