= Meandropsinidae =

Meandropsinidae Temporal range: Cenomanian to Middle Paleocene

Scientific classification
- Domain: Eukaryota
- Clade: Diaphoretickes
- Clade: Sar
- Clade: Rhizaria
- Phylum: Retaria
- Subphylum: Foraminifera
- Class: Tubothalamea
- Order: Miliolida
- Suborder: Miliolina
- Superfamily: Soritoidea
- Family: †Meandropsinidae; Henson, 1948

Genera
- See text

Family of single-celled organisms

Meandropsinidae is an extinct family of miliolid forams found in Upper Cretaceous (Cenomanian) to middle Paleocene marine sediments.

Tests, or shells, are multi-chambered with complex interiors, composed of porcelaineous calcite and variable in form, including discoidal, conical, and cylindrical. Apertures are multiple, in one or more rows.

== Genera ==
Genera included in Meandropsinidae:

- †Alexina Hottinger & Caus, 2009
- †Ayalaina Seiglie, 1961
- †Eofallotia Hottinger & Caus, 2009
- †Fallotia Douvillé, 1902
- †Fascispira A. Silvestri, 1940
- †Hottingerina Drobne, 1975
- †Larrazetia Ciry, 1964
- †Meandropsina Munier-Chalmas, 1898
- †Nummofallotia Barrier & Neumann, 1959
- †Pastrikella Cherchi, Radoičić & Schroeder, 1976
- †Perouvianella G. Bizon, J.J. Bizon, Fourcade & Vachard, 1975
- †Pseudobroeckinella Deloffre & Hamaoui, 1969
- †Raoia Matsumaru & Sarma, 2010
- †Spirapertolina Ciry, 1964
