= Croisaphuill Formation =

Geologic formation in Scotland

- Stratigraphic range: Ordovician (Tulean); ~488.3–472 Ma
- Type: Formation
- Unit of: Durness Group

Lithology
- Primary: Limestone
- Other: Chert

Location
- Region: Scotland
- Country: United Kingdom

The Croisaphuill Formation is a geological formation in Scotland. It preserves fossils dating back to the Ordovician period.

== See also ==
- List of fossiliferous stratigraphic units in Scotland
