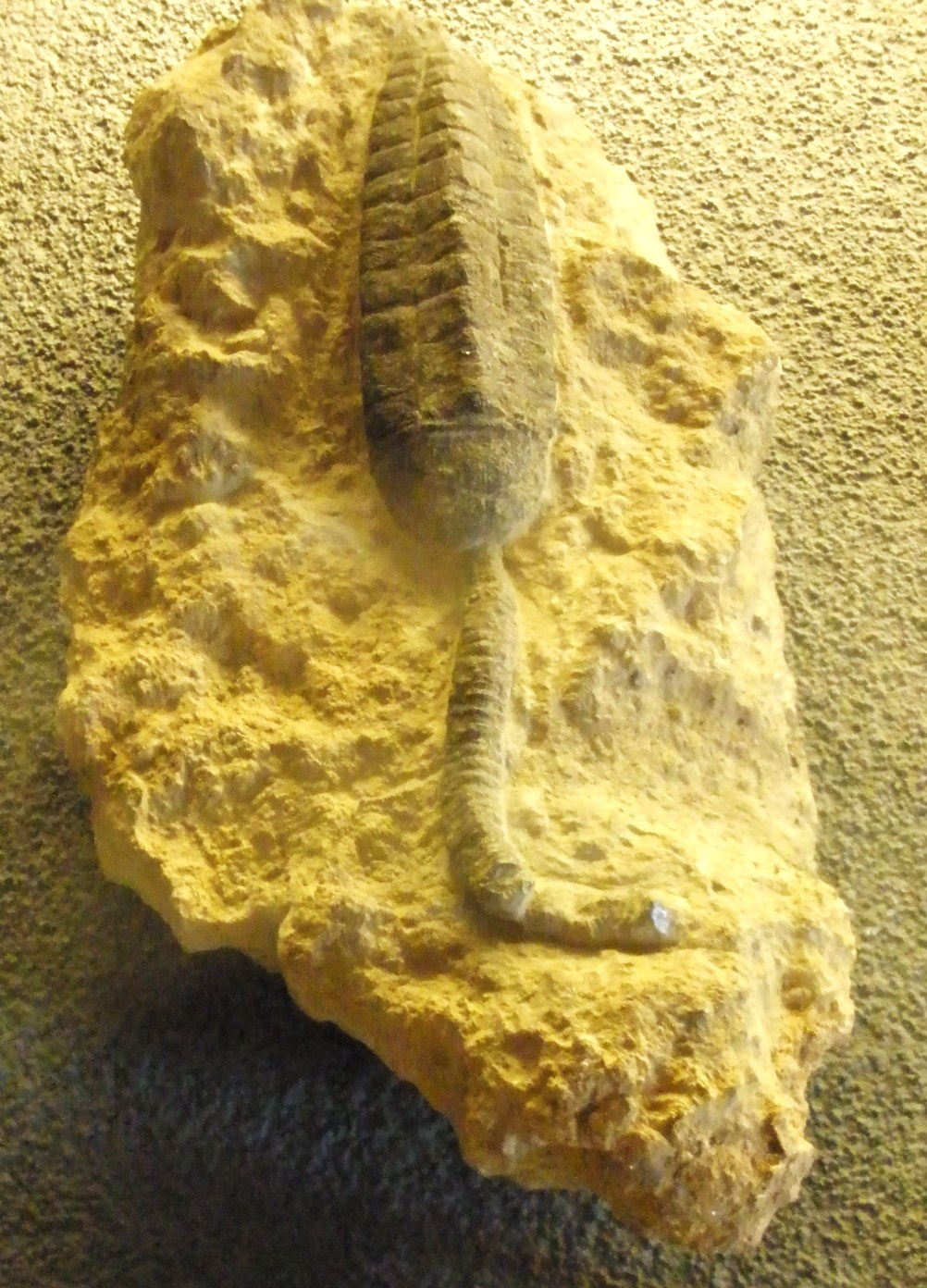
- C. elongatus fossil on display at Naturalis

Scientific classification
- Kingdom: Animalia
- Phylum: Echinodermata
- Class: Crinoidea
- Family: †Cupressocrinitidae
- Genus: †Cupressocrinites; Goldfuss, 1831

= Cupressocrinites =

Cupressocrinites Temporal range: Middle Devonian–Late Devonian

Extinct genus of crinoids

Cupressocrinites is an extinct genus of crinoids from the Middle to Late Devonian of Asia, Australia, Europe, Morocco, and North America.
