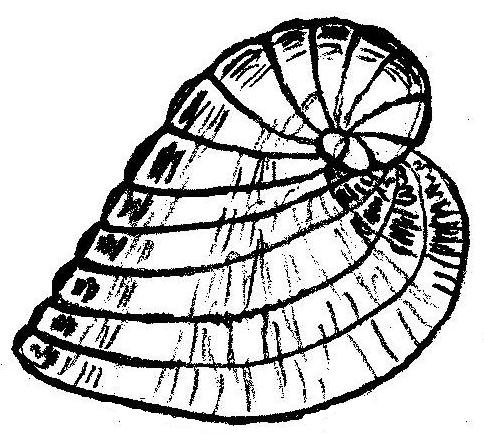
- Illustration of Peneroplis planatus

Scientific classification
- Domain: Eukaryota
- Clade: Diaphoretickes
- Clade: Sar
- Clade: Rhizaria
- Phylum: Retaria
- Subphylum: Foraminifera
- Class: Tubothalamea
- Order: Miliolida
- Suborder: Miliolina
- Superfamily: Soritoidea
- Family: Peneroplidae; Schultze, 1854

Genera
- †Archiacina; Coscinospira; Dendritina; Euthymonacha; Laevipeneroplis; Monalysidium; Peneroplis; †Renulina; Spirolina; †Vandenbroeckia

= Peneroplidae =

Family of single-celled organisms

Peneroplidae is a family of foraminifera in the superfamily Soritoidea.
