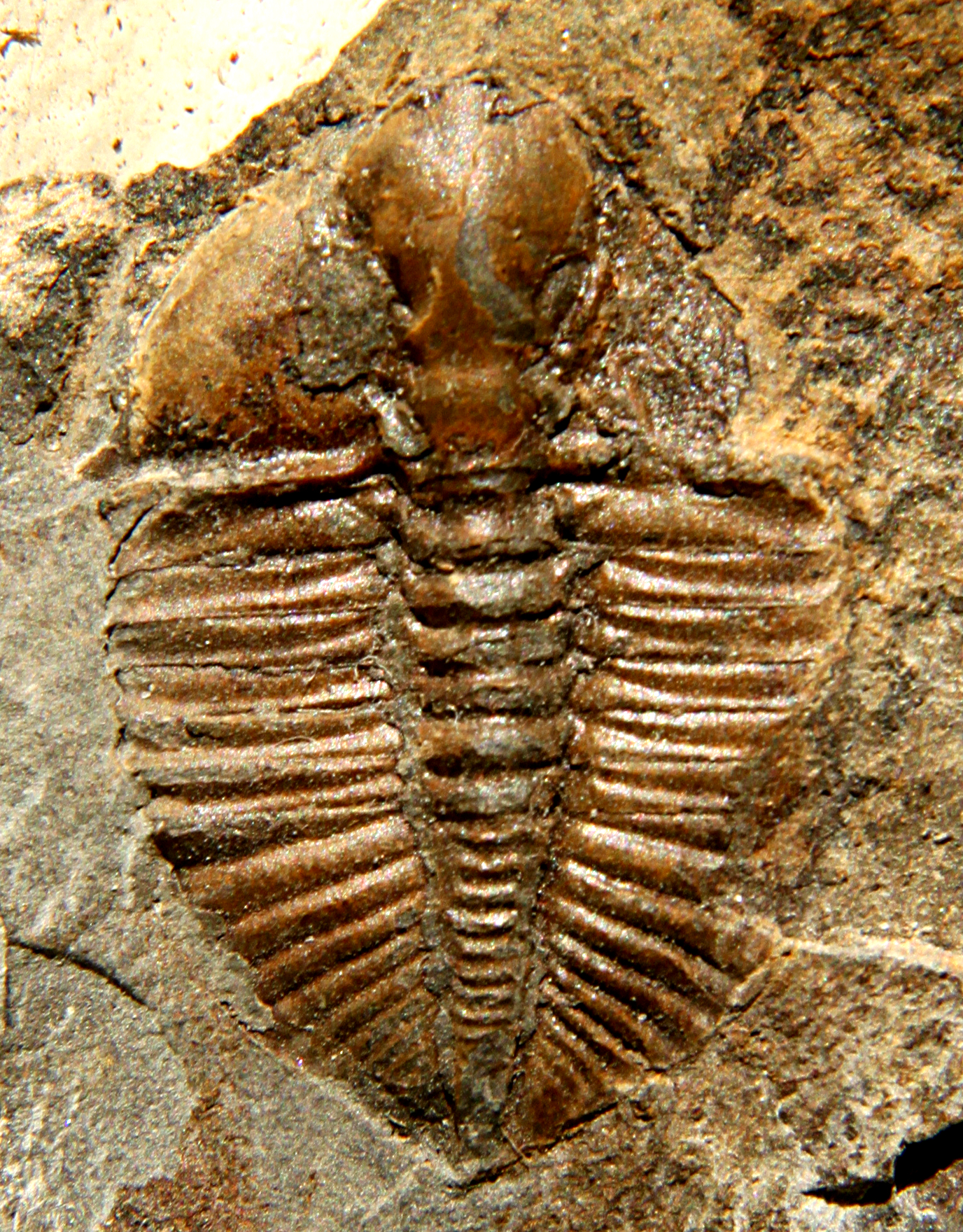
- Cnemidopyge nuda, Wales

Scientific classification
- Domain: Eukaryota
- Kingdom: Animalia
- Phylum: Arthropoda
- Class: †Trilobita
- Order: †Asaphida
- Family: †Raphiophoridae
- Genus: †Cnemidopyge; Whittard, 1955

Species
- C. nuda (Muchison, 1839) (type) synonyms Trinucleus nudus, Ampyx nudus, A. latus

= Cnemidopyge =

Cnemidopyge Temporal range: Ordovician

Extinct genus of trilobites

Cnemidopyge is a genus of trilobites that lived during the Ordovician. Like all Raphiophorids it is blind, with a cephalon that is subtriangular to subsemicircular, carrying genal spines and a forward directed rapier-like spine on the central raised area (or glabella), with the front of the glabella inflated and the natural fracture lines (or sutures) of the cephalon coinciding with its margin. It may be easily distinguished from other raphiophorids by the rectangular thorax with 6 segments, where other genera have a different number of segments and segments change in width over the length of the thorax. Uniquely in this genus, the inner pleural region of the frontal segment is enlarged. Also the axis (or rhachis) and pleural fields of the pygidium are strongly segmented.
