= Petalocrinidae =

Petalocrinidae Temporal range: Early Ordovician–Early Devonian

Scientific classification
- Kingdom: Animalia
- Phylum: Echinodermata
- Class: Crinoidea
- Superfamily: †Gasterocomacea
- Family: †Petalocrinidae; Weller et Davidson, 1896

Genera
- Eopetalocrinus; Petalocrinus; Sinopetalocrinus; Spirocrinus; Vadarocrinus

Family of crinoid

Petalocrinidae is an extinct family of cladid crinoids from the Early Ordovician to Lower Devonian. Fossils of petalocrinoids have been found in China, Europe and the United States.

All petalocrinoids have five, flattened arms formed through the fusion of the branches of the ancestral crinoid arm, an Ordovician crinoid possibly similar to the Silurian Gissocrinus or Arachnocrinus. The shape of these fused arms varies from genus to genus, and from species to species. The upper surface of the arms had distinctive patterns of grooves which are thought to have borne captured food particles towards the mouth. The purpose of the arms, themselves, remain unknown, though, some researchers suspect that they may deterred predators by presenting a would-be attacker with a largely inedible chunk of calcite.

== Genera ==
=== Eopetalocrinus ===
Eopetalocrinus is the earliest known petalocrinoid, known from a single set of five arms from Arenig-aged strata of Southern China.

=== Petalocrinus ===
Petalocrinus is the most successful genus in the family, with numerous species found in Lower Silurian strata in the United States, England, Gotland, and China. The arms of Petalocrinus are usually wedge-shaped, akin to a guitar pick, though, some species, like the English P. bifurcatus, have their own distinct shapes (in the case of P. bifurcatus, each arm is bifurcated into the shape of a "V").

=== Sinopetalocrinus ===
Sinopetalocrinus is one of three petalocrinoid genera endemic to Chinese strata, and is thought to be the daughter genus of Petalocrinus, the result of a diversification event in the early Silurian that produced it, and Spirocrinus. Sinopetalocrinus is very similar in anatomy to Petalocrinus.

=== Spirocrinus ===
Spirocrinus is one of three petalocrinoid genera endemic to Chinese strata. It is found in Lower Silurian strata together with species of its sister genus Sinopetalocrinus, and parent genus Petalocrinus. Spirocrinus is unmistakably distinct, as its arms are modified into cigar-shapes, covered in feeding grooves.

=== Vadarocrinus ===
Vadarocrinus is the only petalocrinoid genus known from the Devonian, being found in lower Devonian strata of the Koněprusy Limestone, Bohemia. The arms are curved downward. Because the paleoenvironment is thought to have been filled with turbulent water currents, and that a recently found stem ossicle suggests a thick stem, Vadarocrinus is thought to have had a very short stem, compared to other petalocrinoids.
