= Durness Group =

- Stratigraphic range: Cambrian–Ordovician
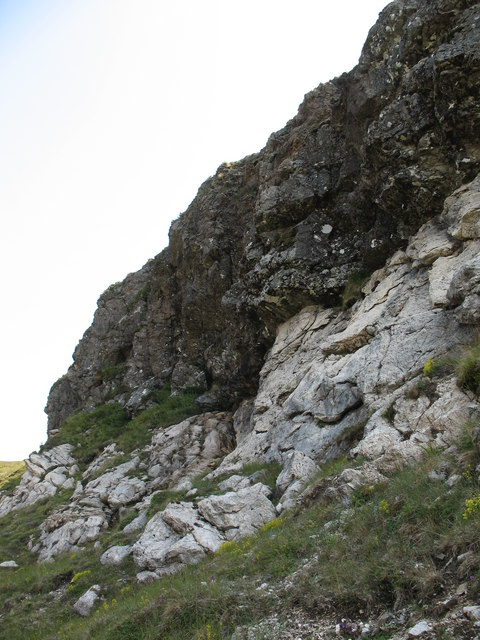
- Dolomites of the Durness Group with schists of the Moine Supergroup thrust over them on the Moine Thrust at Knockan Crag
- Type: Group
- Sub-units: Ghrudaidh Formation, Eilean Dubh Formation, Sailmhor Formation, Sangomore Formation, Balnakiel Formation, Croisaphuill Formation, Durine Formation
- Underlies: Moine Supergroup along the Moine Thrust Belt.
- Overlies: An t-Sron Formation of the Ardvreck Group
- Thickness: up to 750 m (2,460 ft)

Lithology
- Primary: Dolomite
- Other: Limestone, chert

Location
- Region: Northwest Highlands
- Country: Scotland

Type section
- Named for: Durness

The Durness Group is a geological group, a carbonate-dominated stratigraphic unit that forms a c. 170 km long narrow and discontinuous outcrop belt along the north-western coast of Scotland from the Isle of Skye and Loch Kishorn (on the mainland) in the south to Durness and Loch Eriboll in the north. It forms the youngest part of the foreland basin of the Moine Thrust Belt in the Scottish Northwest Highlands and is incorporated into this belt's lowermost thrust sheets, where it is often affected by thrust faulting. It overlies the Ardvreck Group.

The formations of north-western Scotland were once part of a fragment of a then continuous south-eastern margin of Laurentia stretching from western Newfoundland to north-eastern Greenland, which at the time (and prior to the opening of the Atlantic Ocean) were contiguous to the west and to the north respectively. The Durness Group narrow outcrop also forms part of the foreland basin of the Grampian orogeny. Its age ranges from the Cambrian to the Middle Ordovician (mid-Dapingian).

The group is composed of pale grey, buff and dark grey dolostones with intervals of dolomitic limestone (an intermediate between dolomite rock and calcite limestone), limestone and subordinate chert.

The Cambrian parts of the group were formed by carbonate deposition on the southeast-facing continental margin that was subsiding passively. This deposition in Scotland formed part of the Great American Carbonate Bank, a continent-wide area of carbonate deposition created by Ordovician concurrent sedimentation across almost the whole of Laurentia. Deposition in the Ardvreck Group was predominantly marine sandstones.

The Durness and Ardvreck groups Cambrian and Ordovician rocks constitute a depositional sequence of major marine transgression and regression of the Laurentian craton at the Scottish Laurentian Margin Megasequence.

The sedimentary rocks were deposited in a range of shallow marine environments. Evaporite facies deposition was restricted to the intertidal zone as is a rare constituent of successions. Fenestral carbonates, oolites, evaporate pseudomorphs, stromatolites and finely-laminated dolomites with desiccation cracks and teepees were deposited in a supratidal to shallow subtidal setting. In more open marine conditions during maximum flooding events, the Sailmhor and Croisaphuill formations of the Durness Group saw burrowed carbonate mud dominated deposition.

The thick dolostone and limestone beds succession of the Ghrudaidh Formation, the lowest part of the Durness Group, was formed in a range of supratidal, peritidal and shallow marine carbonate platform deposits. Quartz sand grains in its basal part disappear higher up. This has been attributed to an abrupt transgression causing the hinterland sediments to become far distant.

The Ordovician units of the group are found only on Skye, at Stronchrubie in the Assynt area (the Early Ordovician Sailmhor Formation) and around Durness, which is the type area and has the most complete and most structurally intact Ordovician unit north of the Highland Boundary Fault. It has diagenetic overprint with extensive recrystallisation.

The Durine Formation of the group has the youngest deposition in the Scottish sector of the Laurentian margin prior to the Grampian Orogeny. The age of the youngest strata is consistent with the dates for igneous intrusions associated with the Grampian orogeny (475–465 Ma) in Scotland whose peak metamorphism is dated at 473–465 Ma.

== Bibliography ==
- BGS_lexicon "Durness Group". BGS Lexicon of Named Rock Units. British Geological Survey.
- Faggetter, L.E., Wignall, P.B., Pruss, S.B., Sun, Y., Raine, R.J., Newton, R.J., Widdowson, M., Joachimski, M.M. and Smith, M.P. 2018. Sequence stratigraphy, chemostratigraphy and facies analysis of Cambrian Series 2 – Series 3 boundary strata in northwestern Scotland. Geological Magazine, Vol. 155 (5), pp. 865–877.
- Molyneux S.G., Harper D.A.T., Cooper M.R., Hollis S.P., Raine R.J., Rushton A.W.A, M., Smith P., Philip Stone P., Mark Williams M., Woodcock N.H., Zalasiewicz J.A, 2023, A synopsis of the Ordovician System in its birthplace - Britain and Ireland, Geological Society, London, Special Publications
- Reine, R.J., 2009. The Durness Group of NW Scotland: a stratigraphical and sedimentological study of a cambro-ordovician passive margin succession, PhD thesis, University of Birmingham
- Raine E.J., Smith, M.P. 212. Sequence Stratigraphy of the Scottish Laurentian Margin and Recognition of the Sauk Megasequence. In: Derby J., Richard Fritz R., Longacre S., Morgan W., Sternbach C., Great American Carbonate Bank: The Geology and Economic Resources of the Cambrian—Ordovician Sauk Megasequence of Laurentia, American Association of Petroleum Geologists, Vol. 98
- Raine R.J., Smith, M.P. 2017. Sabkha facies and the preservation of a Falling Stage Systems Tract at the Sauk II–III supersequence boundary in the Late Cambrian Eilean Dubh Formation, NW Scotland. Journal of Sedimentary Research, 87, 41–65
