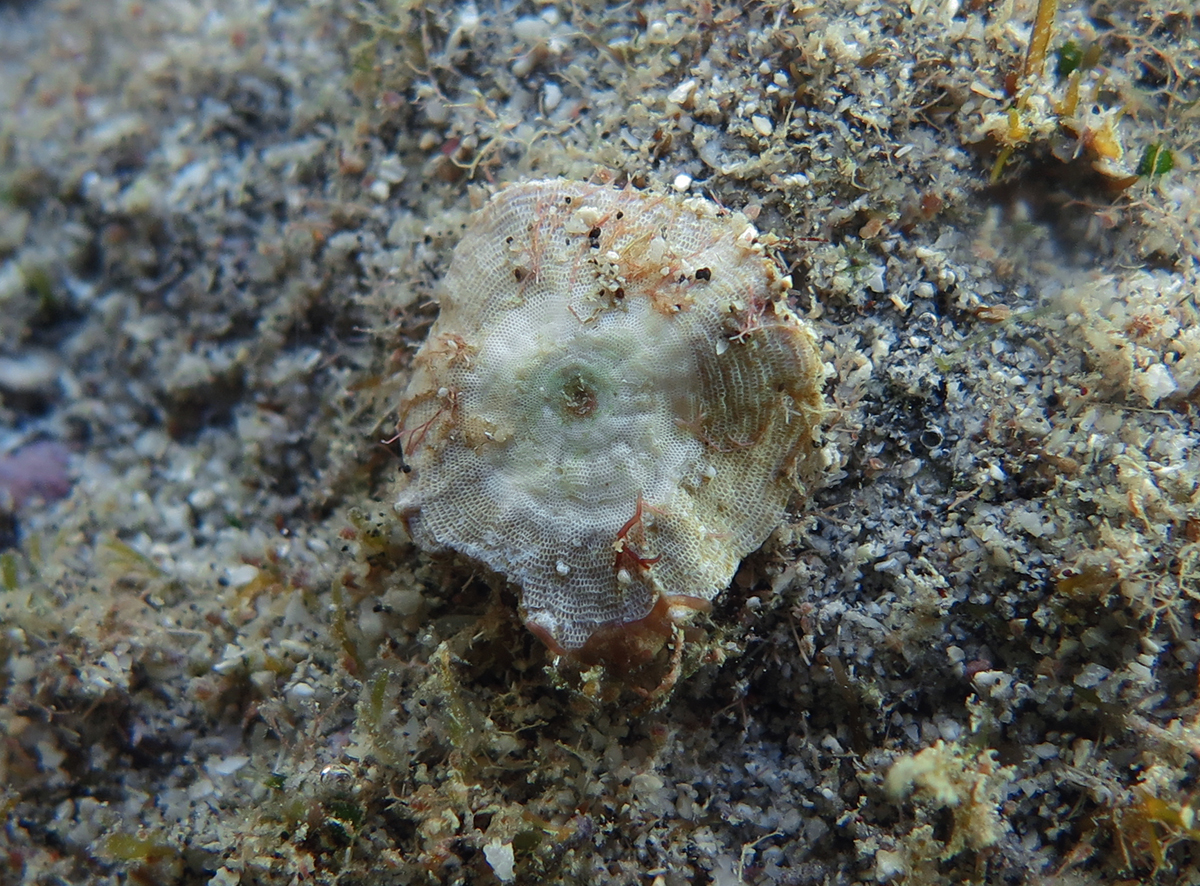

Scientific classification
- Domain: Eukaryota
- Clade: Sar
- Clade: Rhizaria
- Phylum: Foraminifera
- Class: Tubothalamea
- Order: Miliolida
- Family: Soritidae
- Genus: Marginopora
- Species: M. vertebralis

Binomial name
- Marginopora vertebralis Quoy & Gaimard, 1830

Synonyms
- Orbitolites vertebralis (Quoy & Gaimard, 1830)

= Marginopora vertebralis =

Species of single-celled organism

Marginopora vertebralis is a foraminiferan, 1 to 2 centimetres (0.4 to 0.8 in) in diameter found in the tropical Indo-Pacific region. It is a disc-shaped, macroscopic unicellular organism, with a hard calcareous test.

== Description ==
Foraminiferans are single-celled lifeforms, and Marginopora vertebralis is exceptionally large, forming discs that can be 1.5 to 2 cm (0.6 to 0.8 in) in diameter, or even larger. Each disc is thicker at the margin than it is in the middle, and the central portion may have eroded away. The test or calcareous shell is secreted by the foram, and is surrounded by the cell membrane, a thin layer of cytoplasm. The foram grows by adding a concentric ring of new calcareous material to the periphery. The new growth is divided into chambers by internal walls. The compartments are interconnected, and there are fine holes in the exterior surface of the test through which pseudopodia extend. The pseudopodia have a locomotory and food capturing function, as well as helping the organism adhere to the substrate. Living Marginopora vertebralis have a yellowish-greenish-brown colour, with a pale-coloured, creamy thickened margin. After death, the bleached test remains relatively intact.

== Ecology ==
Marginopora vertebralis is host to symbiotic zooxanthellae, most commonly Gymnodinium rotundatum, which are present in large numbers in the protoplasm, and give the living foraminiferan its colour. Marginopora vertebralis, and other related foraminiferans, tend to occupy similar habitats to reef-building corals, and may have an ecological relationship with the corals, serving as alternate hosts to the zooxanthellae which sometimes get expelled by the corals under stressful conditions.

During the day, Marginopora vertebralis obtains nutrients from the symbiotic zooxanthellae. At night, it moves to a new location and attaches itself to the substrate. It feeds on the diatoms, microalgae and fragments of organic detritus that are within reach of its pseudopodia, absorbing them by phagocytosis. When it moves on, it leaves behind a small, mucous pellet of indigestible material.

Marginopora vertebralis exhibits an alternation between haploid and diploid generations, and there may be several instances of asexual reproduction between the sexual generations. Whether produced by sexual or asexual means, the embryos are stored in the marginal compartments. In a surprisingly complex behaviour for a single-celled lifeform, the disc is partially lifted off the substrate by the pseudopodia, and raised into an upward position balanced on its edge; it is held in this position for up to two days while the peripheral compartments break apart, releasing the embryos. Having dispersed a short way, the embryos settle on the substrate and begin to secrete embryonic tests.

Marginopora vertebralis is eaten by invertebrates such as sea urchins, molluscs, flatworms and shrimps, but the main predators are sea cucumbers which churn up and ingest the sand on the seabed. When fish graze on the algae and sea grasses to which the foraminiferan is attached, they usually pass through the gut unaffected. The tests are hard-wearing and durable and M. vertebralis may live for two or three years.
