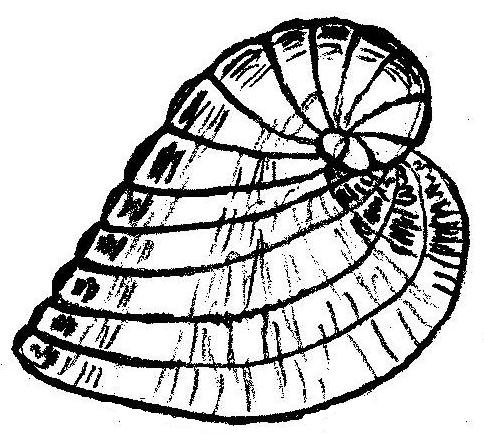
- Illustration of Peneroplis planatus

Scientific classification
- Domain: Eukaryota
- Clade: Sar
- Clade: Rhizaria
- Phylum: Retaria
- Subphylum: Foraminifera
- Class: Tubothalamea
- Order: Miliolida
- Family: Peneroplidae
- Genus: Peneroplis de Montfort, 1808

Species
- Peneroplis arbusculus Peneroplis carinatus Peneroplis ellipticus Peneroplis karreri Peneroplis mauii Peneroplis pertusus Peneroplis planatus Peneroplis polita Peneroplis sollasi

Synonyms
- Cristellaria Lamarck, 1816

= Peneroplis =

Peneroplis Temporal range: 99.6–0 Ma

Genus of single-celled organisms

Peneroplis is an extant genus of benthic Foraminifera in the family Peneroplidae. The genus is also represented in the fossil record.

Peneroplis dwell in upper photic zone. They favour tropical to temperate shallow marine environments, feeding on diatoms

== See also ==
- List of prehistoric foraminifera genera
