= Anglagnostus =

Scientific classification
- Domain: Eukaryota
- Kingdom: Animalia
- Phylum: Arthropoda
- Class: †Trilobita (?)
- Order: †Agnostida
- Family: †Agnostidae
- Genus: †Anglagnostus; Howell, 1935

Extinct genus of trilobites

Anglagnostus is a genus of trilobites in the order Agnostida, which existed in what is now Shineton, England. It was described by Howell in 1935, and the type species is Anglagnostus dux, which was originally described as a species of Agnostus.
