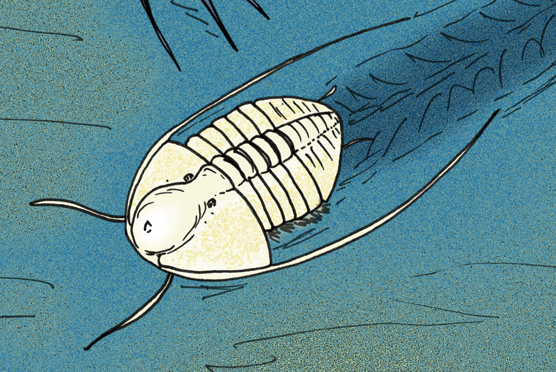
- G. trinucleoides

Scientific classification
- Domain: Eukaryota
- Kingdom: Animalia
- Phylum: Arthropoda
- Class: †Trilobita
- Order: †Asaphida
- Family: †Raphiophoridae
- Genus: †Globampyx; Fortey, 1975

Species
- G. linnarssoni (Schmidt, 1894)(synonym Ampyx linnarssoni); G. obtusus (Moberg & Segerberg, 1906) synonym (Ampyx obtusus); G. sexsegmentatus Fortey, Vargas-Parra & Droser, 2024; G. sinalae Norford & Ross, 1978; G. trinucleoides Fortey, 1975 (type)

= Globampyx =

Globampyx Temporal range: Late Arenig

Extinct genus of trilobites

Globampyx is an extinct genus raphiophorid trilobites. It lived during the later part of the Arenig stage of the Ordovician Period, approximately 478 to 471 million years ago. Species of the genus are known from Canada (southeastern British Columbia), Norway (Svalbard) and Sweden.

== Distribution ==
- G. sinalae is known from the Middle Ordovician of Canada (Orthidiella brachiopod zone, Glenogle Shales Formation, North White River Section, British Columbia, 471.8-468.1 Ma)
- G. trinucleoides is known from the Middle Ordovician of Svalbard (Psephosthenaspis microspinosa small shelly zone, Olenidsletta Member, Valhallfonna Formation, Ny friesland, 471.8-457.5 Ma)

== Description ==
The headshield (or cephalon) of Globampyx is densely covered with very small granules. The central raised area of the cephalon (or glabella) has an inverted flask-shape. It lacks the rapier-like glabellar spine of many other raphiophorids, but only has a tubercle. The thorax has five segments. The short but wide triangular pygidium, with a rather low axis (or rhachis) of up to six indistinct rings that reaches the faint border furrow.
