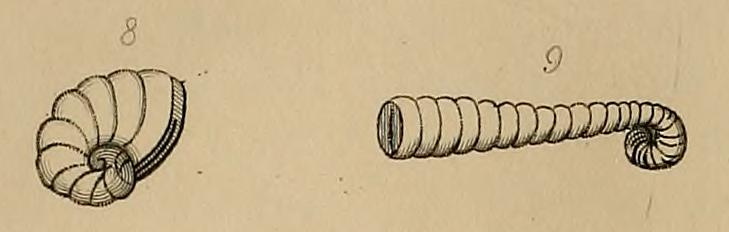
- Illustration of Spirolina depressa and Spirolina cylindracea

Scientific classification
- Domain: Eukaryota
- Clade: Sar
- Clade: Rhizaria
- Phylum: Retaria
- Subphylum: Foraminifera
- Class: Tubothalamea
- Order: Miliolida
- Family: Peneroplidae
- Genus: Spirolina; Lamarck, 1804

Species
- Spirolina austriaca d'Orbigny, 1846 †; Spirolina clavata Crouch, 1827; Spirolina cylindracea Lamarck, 1804; Spirolina dissimilis McCulloch, 1977; Spirolina laevigata d'Orbigny, 1850; Spirolina limatula McCulloch, 1977; Spirolina pedum d'Orbigny, 1850; Spirolina semilituus (Linnaeus, 1758); Spirolina striata d'Orbigny, 1850

= Spirolina =

Genus of protists

Spirolina is a genus of foraminifera in the family Peneroplidae.
