= Raphiophorus =

Raphiophorus Temporal range: 486–419 Ma

Scientific classification
- Kingdom: Animalia
- Phylum: Arthropoda
- Clade: †Artiopoda
- Class: †Trilobita
- Order: †Asaphida
- Family: †Raphiophoridae
- Genus: †Raphiophorus; Angelin, 1854

Extinct genus of trilobites

Raphiophorus is a genus of the family Raphiophoridae in the Ordovician and Silurian periods. It has been reported from East Asia, North Africa, North and South America, and especially Europe.
