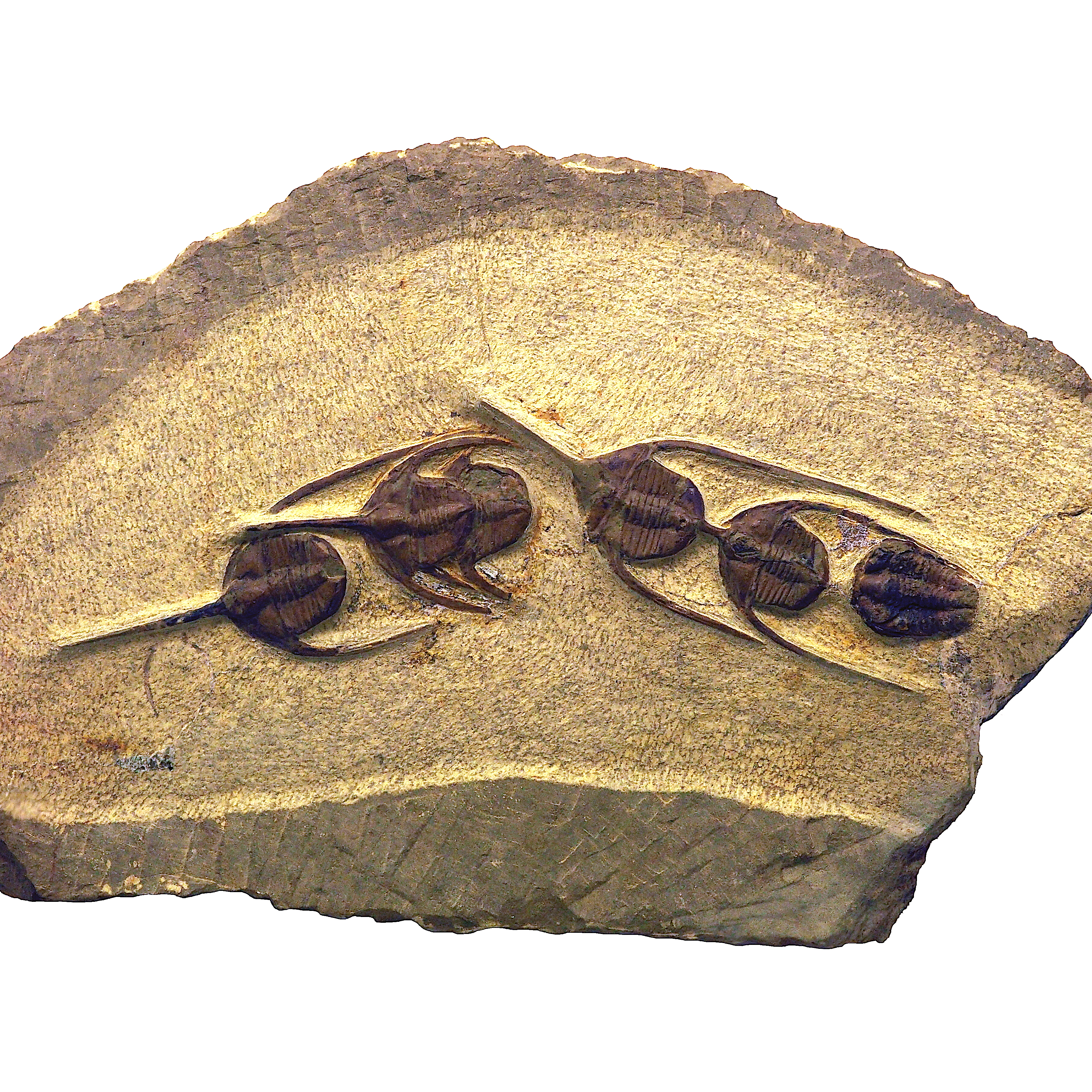
- Ampyx cetsarum group

Scientific classification
- Kingdom: Animalia
- Phylum: Arthropoda
- Clade: †Artiopoda
- Class: †Trilobita
- Order: †Asaphida
- Family: †Raphiophoridae
- Genus: †Ampyx; Dalman, 1827

Type species
- Ampyx nasutus

Species
- A. gongwusuensis Lee et al., 2016; A. nasutus Dalman, 1827

Synonyms
- Brachyampyx

= Ampyx (trilobite) =

Ampyx Temporal range: Ordovician-Silurian ~478.6–416.0 Ma

Extinct genus of trilobites

Ampyx is an Ordovician-Silurian genus of Asaphid trilobites of the family Raphiophoridae. Species of Ampyx are characterized by three extended spines on the head-shield, one spine derived from each free cheek, and one spine emanating from the glabellum. Species include Ampyx linleyensis (Lanvirn-Caradoc series).

Species of Ampyx grew to an average length of 1.5 inches (3.8 cm).

== Collective behaviour ==
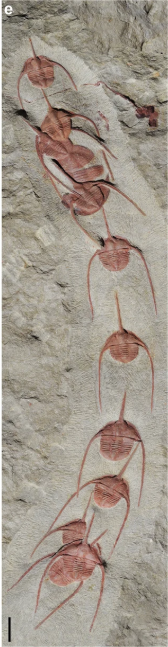
Linear cluster of Ampyx priscus

Fossils of the trilobite Ampyx priscus, dating back about 480 million years ago, have been described as clustered in lines along the ocean floor. The animals were all mature adults, and were all facing the same direction as though they had formed a conga line or a peloton. It has been suggested they lined up in this manner to migrate, much as spiny lobsters migrate in single-file queues, or perhaps for mating purposes. The findings suggest animal collective behaviour has very early evolutionary origins.

== Distribution ==
Fossils of Ampyx have been found in:

Ordovician

- Acoite, Suri, Ponon-Trehue, Sepulturas and San Juan Formations, Argentina
- Sella Formation, Bolivia
- Australia
- Canada (British Columbia, Newfoundland and Labrador, Northwest Territories, Quebec, Yukon)
- China
- France
- Iran
- Ireland
- Morocco
- Norway
- Russia
- Sweden
- United Kingdom
- United States (California, Maine, Nevada, Tennessee, Virginia)

Silurian

- Italy
- United Kingdom

== See also ==
- List of trilobites
