= Swithland Formation =

Geologic formation in Leicestershire, the United Kingdom

- Stratigraphic range: Cambrian 532–520 Ma
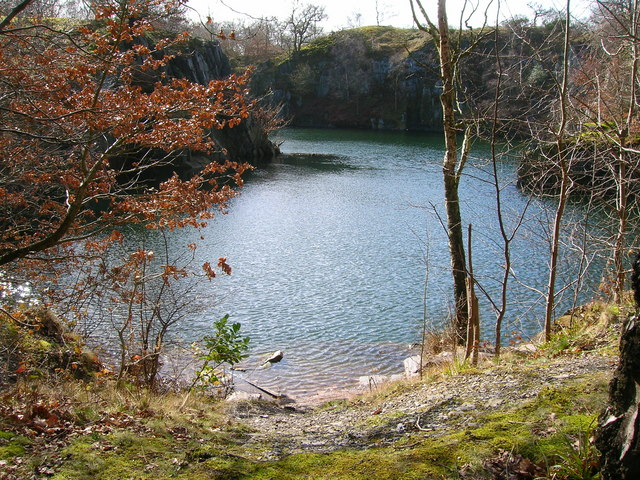
- Swithland Wood and The Brand, which gave the first half of its name to the formation, which itself can be found here.
- Type: Formation
- Unit of: Brand Group
- Sub-units: South Quarry Slump Breccia, Lubcloud Greywackes and Morley Lane Tuffs Members
- Overlies: Brand Hills Formation
- Thickness: 260 m (853 ft)

Lithology
- Primary: Pelite
- Other: Shale, Greywacke, Conglomerate

Location
- Region: Leicestershire
- Country: United Kingdom

Type section
- Named for: Swithland Wood and The Brand

The Swithland Formation is a geologic formation in Leicestershire, and lies within the wider Swithland Wood and The Brand area. It preserves ichnotaxon dating back to the Cambrian period.

== Paleobiota ==
The Swithland Formation preserves a lot of Cambrian ichnogenera, which are usually attributed to burrowing organisms like marine annelids. The most important one from this formation is Teichichnus, which was the first one found, and the one that proved this Brand Group was Cambrian in age, which also led to the discovery and research of a diorite unconformity between the Brand and Maplewell Groups.

Color key
Taxon	Reclassified taxon	Taxon falsely reported as present	Dubious taxon or junior synonym	Ichnotaxon	Ootaxon	Morphotaxon

Notes
Uncertain or tentative taxa are in small text; ~~crossed out~~ taxa are discredited.

=== Ichnogenera ===
Genus	Species	Notes	Images
Palaeophycus	Palaeophycus isp.	Burrows.	
Planolites	Planolites isp.	Burrows.	
Skolithos	Skolithos isp.	Burrows.	
Teichichnus	T. rectus	Burrows.	

== See also ==
- List of fossiliferous stratigraphic units in the United Kingdom
