= Quartz arenite =

Sandstone with quartz

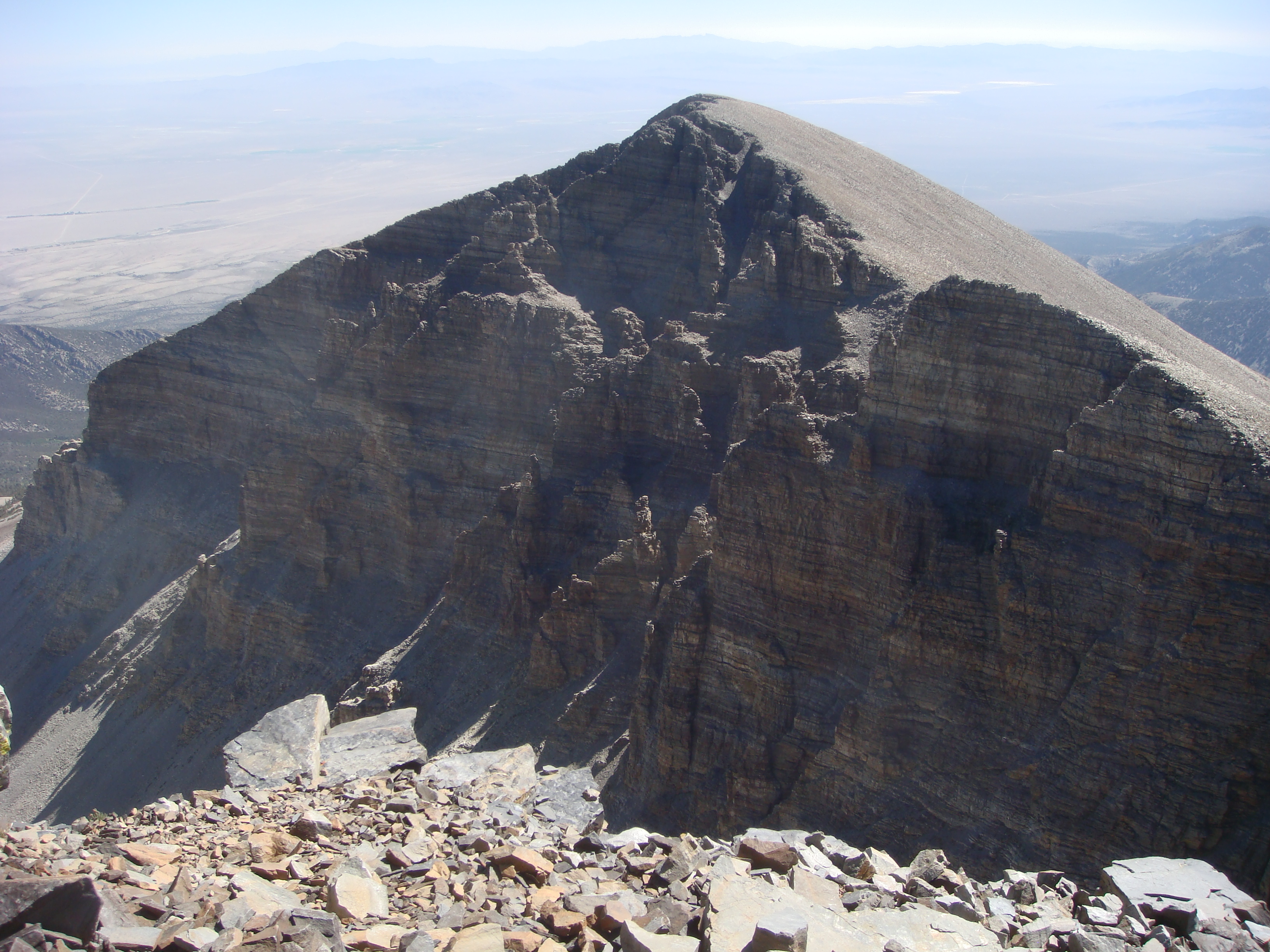
Quartz arenite makes up the Prospect Mountain Quartzite on top of Doso Doyabi, Nevada

A quartz arenite or quartzarenite is a sandstone composed of greater than 90% detrital quartz. Quartz arenites are the most mature sedimentary rocks possible, and are often referred to as ultra- or super-mature, and are usually cemented by silica. They often exhibit both textural and compositional maturity. The two primary sedimentary depositional environments that produce quartz arenites are beaches/upper shoreface and aeolian processes.

== See also ==
- Arkose – Type of sandstone containing at least 25% feldspar
- Lithic sandstone – Sandstone with fragments of other rocks
