= Stockingford Shale Group =

Sedimentary sequence in England

- Stratigraphic range: Furongian Epoch, Cambrian to Tremadocian, Ordovician
- Type: Group
- Sub-units: Merevale Shales, Monks Park Shale, Moor Wood Sandstone, Outwoods Shale, Mancetter Shale, Abbey Shale and Purley Shales formations
- Overlies: Harthill Sandstone Formation
- Thickness: about 775m

Lithology
- Primary: mudstones
- Other: sandstones

Location
- Region: Midlands
- Country: England

Type section
- Named for: Stockingford

The Stockingford Shale Group is a Cambrian to Ordovician lithostratigraphic group (a sequence of rock strata) in the English Midlands. These rocks are found northwestwards from Bedworth. The name is derived from Stockingford, a suburb of Nuneaton in Warwickshire. This rock succession was formerly known as the Stockingford Shales and ascribed to the two British regional stratigraphic units, the Comley and Tremadoc series, though these terms are now obsolete. Overlying the Harthill Sandstone Formation, the Group comprises around 775 metres thickness of mudstones with some subordinate sandstones. Some burrows and bioturbation are present. The uppermost unit is the early Ordovician Merevale Shale Formation, a mudstone with some dolomitic beds. Beneath this in descending order (increasing age) are the Monks Park Shale, Moor Wood Sandstone, Outwoods Shale, Mancetter Shale, Abbey Shale and Purley Shales formations, the last being of Comley age in its lower parts.
