= Caradoc Series =

Sandstone series of Caer Caradoc in Shropshire, England

In geology, Caradoc Series is the name introduced by Roderick Murchison in 1839 for the sandstone series of Caer Caradoc in Shropshire, England. It is the fifth of the six subdivisions (in ascending order) of the Ordovician System, comprising all those rocks deposited worldwide during the Caradocian Age (458 to 448 million years ago).

The limits of Murchison's Caradoc series have since been somewhat modified, and through the labours of Charles Lapworth the several members of the series have been precisely defined by means of graptolitic zones. These zones are identical with those found in the rocks of the same age in North Wales, the Bala Series, and the terms Bala or Caradoc series are used interchangeably by geologists when referring to the uppermost substage of the Ordovician System.

The Ordovician rocks of the Caradoc district have been subdivided into the following beds, in descending order: the Trinucleus shales, Acton Scott beds, Longville flags, Chatwell and Soudley sandstones, Harnage shales and Hoar Edge grits and limestone. In the Corndon district in the same county the Caradoc series is represented by the Marrington group of ashes and shales and the Spy Wood group beneath them; these two groups of strata are sometimes spoken of as the Chirbury series. In the Breidden district are the barren Criggeon shales with ashes and flows of andesite.

In the Lake district the Coniston limestone series represents the Upper Caradocian, the lower portion being taken up by part of the great Borrowdale volcanic series of rocks. The Coniston limestone series contains the following subdivisions Ashgill group (Ashgill shales and Staurocephalus limestone) -

- Kiesley limestone.
- Sleddale group (Applethwaite beds) Upper Coniston limestone conglomerate; Yarlside rhyolite; stye end beds=Lower Coniston limestone.
- Roman Fell group (Corona beds).
- The Dufton shales and Drygill shales are equivalents of the Sleddale group.

Rocks of Caradoc age are well developed in southern Scotland; in the Girvan district they have been described as the Ardmillan series with the Drummock group and Barren Flagstone group in the upper portion, and the Whitehouse, Ardwell and Balclatchie groups in the lower part. Similarly, two divisions, known as the Upper and Lower Hartfell series, are recognized in the southern and central area, in Peeblesshire, Ayrshire and Dumfriesshire.

In Ireland the Caradoc or Bala series is represented by the limestones of Portraine near Dublin and of the Chair of Kildare; by the Ballymoney series of Wexford and Carnalea shales of County Down. In the Lough Mask district beds of this age are found, as in Wales, interstratified with volcanic lavas and tuffs. Other localities are known in counties Tyrone, Meath and Louth, also in Lambay Island.

== Early descriptions of the Bala series ==
The Bala Series was described as a group of dark slates and sandstones with beds of limestone which occurs in the neighborhood of Bala, Gwynedd, in north Wales.

It was first described by Adam Sedgwick, who considered it to be the upper part of his Cambrian System. The Bala limestone is from 20 to 40 ft (12 m) thick, and is recognizable over most of North Wales. The series in the type area consists of the Hirnant limestone, a thin inconstant bed, which is separated by 1,400 ft (430 m). of slates from the Bala limestone, below this are more slates and volcanic rocks. The latter are represented by large contemporaneous deposits of tuff and felsitic lava which in the Snowdon District are several thousand feet thick.

In South Wales the Bala Series contains the following beds in descending order: the Trinucleus seticornis beds (Slade beds, Redhill shales and Sholeshook limestone), the Robeston Wathen beds, and the Dicranograplus shales. The typical graptolites are, in the upper part, Dicellograptus anceps and D. complanatus; in the lower part, Pleurograptus linearis and Dicranograptus clingani.

== Bibliography ==
- Nat. Hist., 5th series, vol. vi., 1880; Geol. Mag., 1889; C. Lapworth and W. W. Watts, Proc. Geol. Assoc., xiii., 1894; J. E. Marr, Geol.

Meg., 1892; J. B. Marr and T. Roberts, Q. J. G. S., 1885; B. N.

- B.Peach and J. Horne, Silurian Rocks of Great Britain, vol. I., 1899
