= Cyclopyge =

Cylcopyge may refer to:

- Cyclopyge (trilobite) Hawle & Corda, 1847, a genus of trilobites in the family Cyclopygidae
- Cyclopyge (butterfly) Mielke, 2002, a genus of insects in the family Hesperiidae
