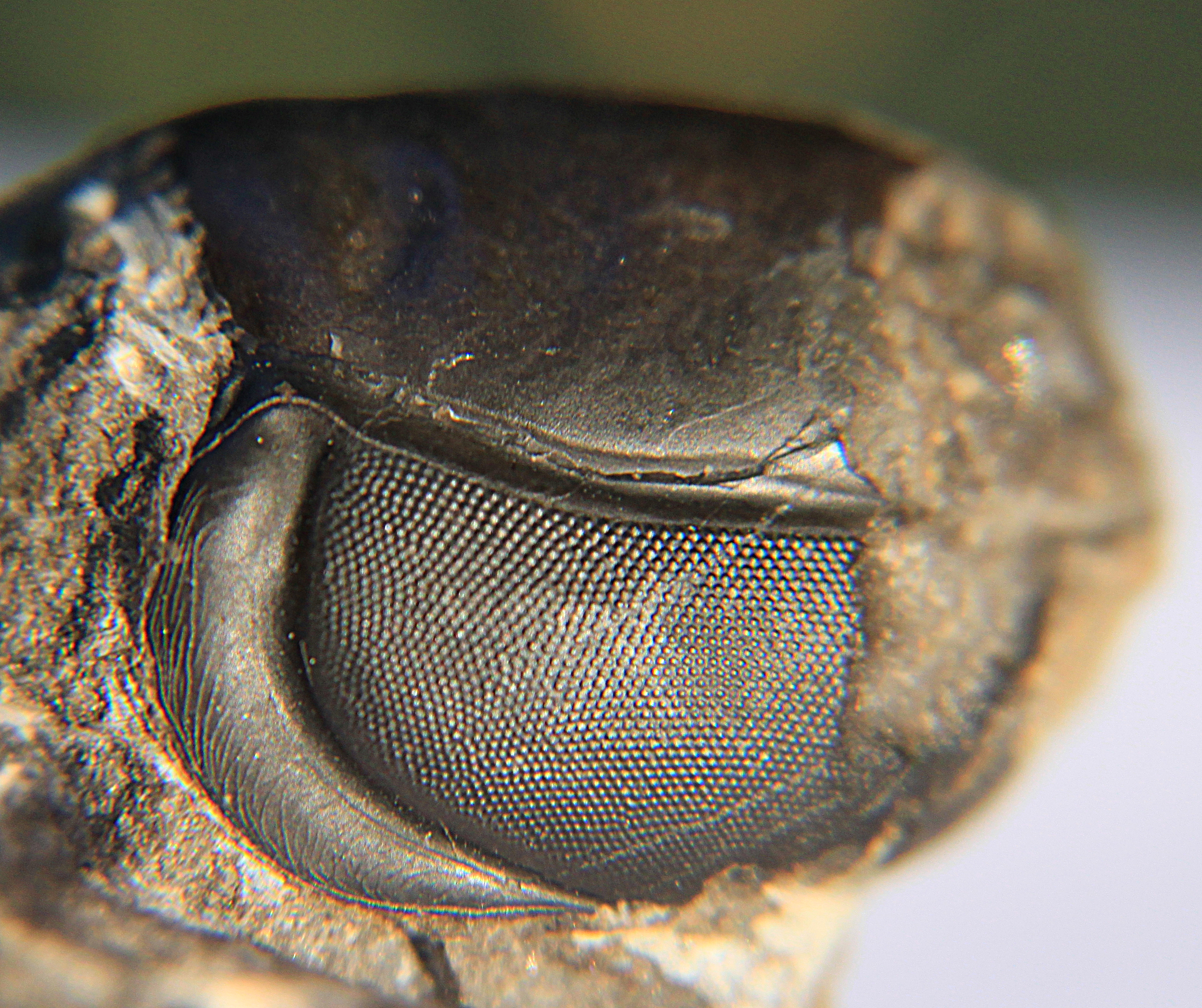
- probably Symphysops stevaninae, cephalon 24mm long, lateral view, found near Alnif, Morocco, from the Ordovician

Scientific classification
- Kingdom: Animalia
- Phylum: Arthropoda
- Clade: †Artiopoda
- Class: †Trilobita
- Order: †Asaphida
- Family: †Cyclopygidae
- Genus: †Symphysops; Raymond, 1925

Species
- See text

= Symphysops =

Symphysops Temporal range: Middle to Upper Ordovician

Extinct genus of trilobites

Symphysops is a genus of trilobites of average size, belonging to the Cyclopygidae family. It had a cosmopolitan distribution and lived from the Middle to the Upper Ordovician (Llanvirn to Ashgill). It has been found in Canada (Quebec and Newfoundland), China, the Czech Republic (Bohemia), Iran, Ireland, Kazakhstan, Poland, Morocco, Spain, Scotland and Wales. The name Symphysops refers to the fused eyes, common to the species of this genus. Some (sub)species of the cyclopygid genera Cyclopyge and Pricyclopyge share this character, but Symphysops uniquely combines the merged eye with a frontal thorn on the head and the "lower eyelid".

== Description ==
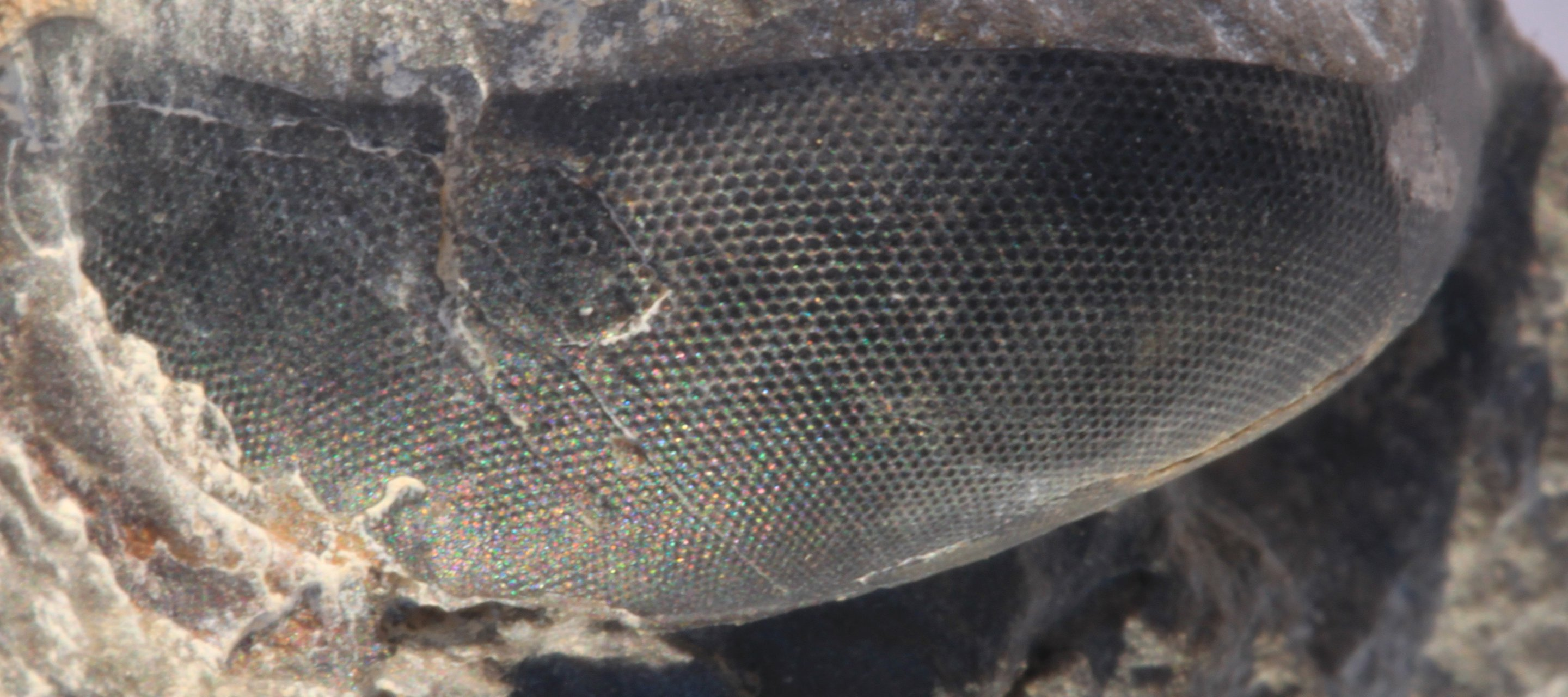

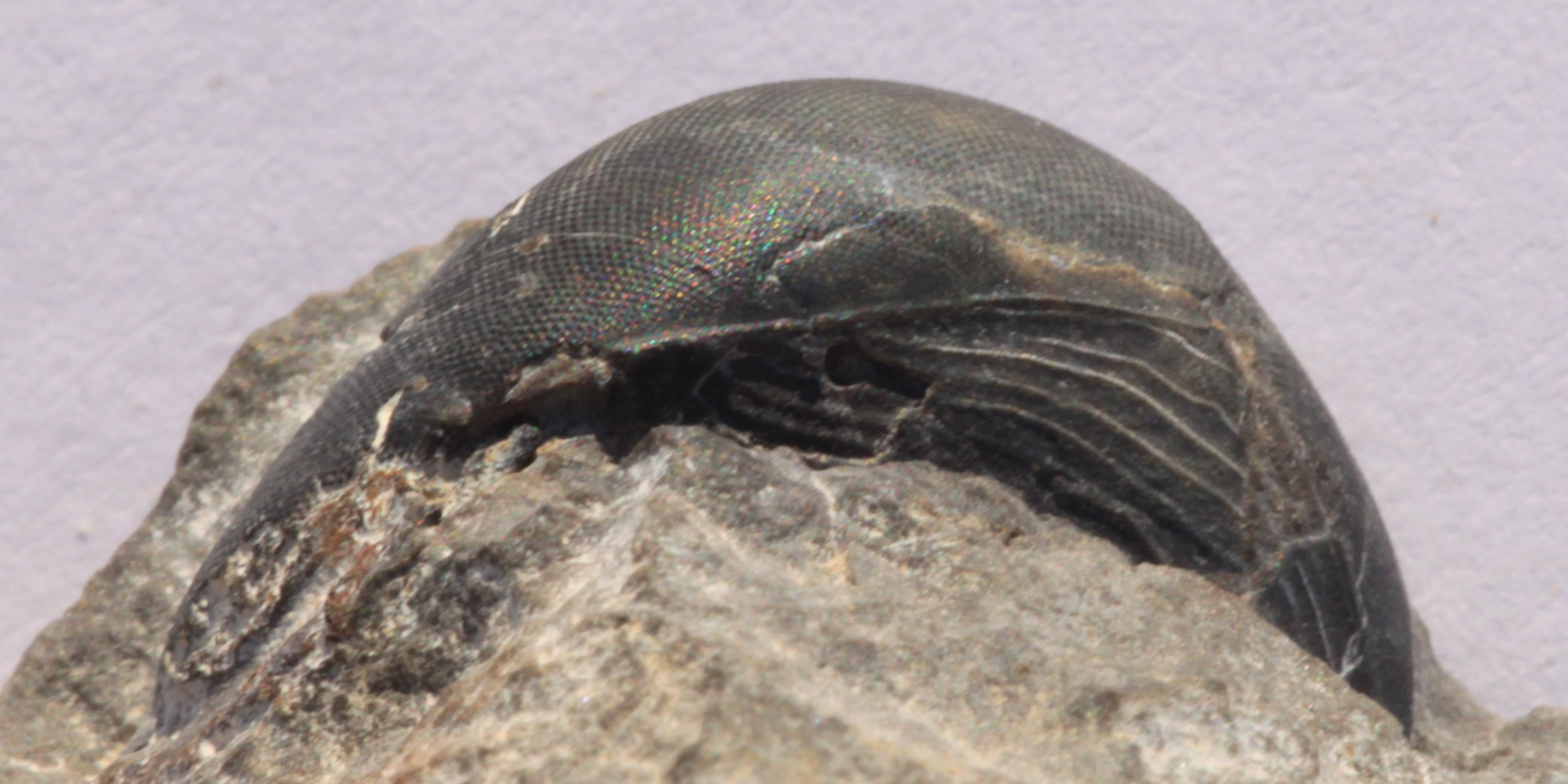
set of merged eyes

Symphysops is characterized by large eyes that merge at the front of the headshield (or cephalon) to form what looks like a visor with at the back a wide free cheek. The remainder of the cephalon is filled by the glabella, which in most species extends into a forward pointing thorn at its frontal tip. The occipital ring cannot be distinguish from the rest of the glabella, which has two pair of transverse furrows, the rear pair distinct, and the frontal pair very shallow. The thorax consists of six segments, the frontal segment carrying backward directed pleural spines.

== Ecology ==
Symphysops has features typically associated with a pelagic lifestyle, among which very large eyes, compact thorax and indications of strong musculature. In some later cyclopygids, progressive enlargement resulted in the anterior fusion of their eyes. Given the weight of the dorsal exoskeleton, it is likely cyclopygids swam upside down, not unlike some extant crustaceans with pelagic lifestyles.

Symphysops is often found in the company of other pelagic trilobites such as Cyclopyge, Degamella, Opipeuterella and Carolinites.

== Species ==
- S. armatus (Barrande, 1872) (type) synonym Aeglina armata
- S. dejhaglensis Kolova, 1936
- S. mitrata (Novak, 1883) synonym Aeglina mitrata
- S. sinensis Han, 1983
- S. spinifera Cooper & Kindle, 1936
- S. stevaninae López-Soriano & Corbacho, 2012
- S. subarmatus (Reed, 1914)
  - S. subarmatus subarmatus
  - S. subarmatus elongatus Kielan, 1959
- S. sulcatus (Barrande, 1872) synonym Aeglina sulcata
