= Telephina =

Telephina Temporal range: Ordovician

Scientific classification
- Kingdom: Animalia
- Phylum: Arthropoda
- Clade: †Artiopoda
- Class: †Trilobita
- Order: †Proetida
- Family: †Telephinidae
- Genus: †Telephina; Marek, 1952

Species
- Telephina americana Billings, 1865; Telephina angulata Yi, 1957; Telephina bicuspis Angelin, 1854; Telephina bilunata Ulrich, 1930; Telephina bipunctata Ulrich, 1930; Telephina brevica Zhang, 1981; Telephina buttsi Ulrich, 1930; Telephina calandria Chatterton et al., 1999; Telephina chinensis Yi, 1957; Telephina chingolo Chatterton et al., 1999; Telephina convexa Lu, 1975; Telephina fracta Barrande, 1852; Telephina furnesensis Nikolaisen, 1963; Telephina gelasinosa Ulrich, 1926; Telephina girvanensis Reed, 1935; Telephina hibernica Reed, 1909; Telephina hircina Ulrich, 1930; Telephina impunctata Ulrich, 1930; Telephina imperfecta Thorslund, 1935; Telephina lata Ulrich, 1930; Telephina matchensis Legg, 1976; Telephina mobergi Hadding, 1913; Telephina mysticensis Ulrich, 1930; Telephina norvegica Nikolaisen, 1963; Telephina omega Koroleva, 1982; Telephina pacifica Kobayashi, 1955; Telephina prattensis Ulrich, 1930; Telephina problematica Chatterton et al., 1999; Telephina pustulata Ulrich, 1930; Telephina reedi Ulrich, 1930; Telephina salteri Reed, 1914; Telephina simulator Ulrich, 1930; Telephina sinuata Ulrich, 1930; Telephina skjesethi Nikolaisen, 1963; Telephina spinifera Ulrich, 1930; Telephina subsecuta Reed, 1944; Telephina sulcata Nikolaisen, 1963; Telephina tellicoensis Ulrich, 1930; Telephina transversa Ulrich, 1930; Telephina troedssoni Raymond, 1925; Telephina ulrichi Thorslund, 1935; Telephina vesca Nikolaisen, 1963; Telephina viriosa Nikolaisen, 1963; Telephina wegelini Angelin, 1854

Extinct genus of telephinid trilobite

Telephina is an extinct genus of telephinid trilobite that lived during the Ordovician period.

== Palaeobiology ==
=== Life history ===
Late in the meraspid stage of ontogeny, the species Telephina problematica, Telephina calandria, and Telephina chingolo underwent a radical metamorphosis.
