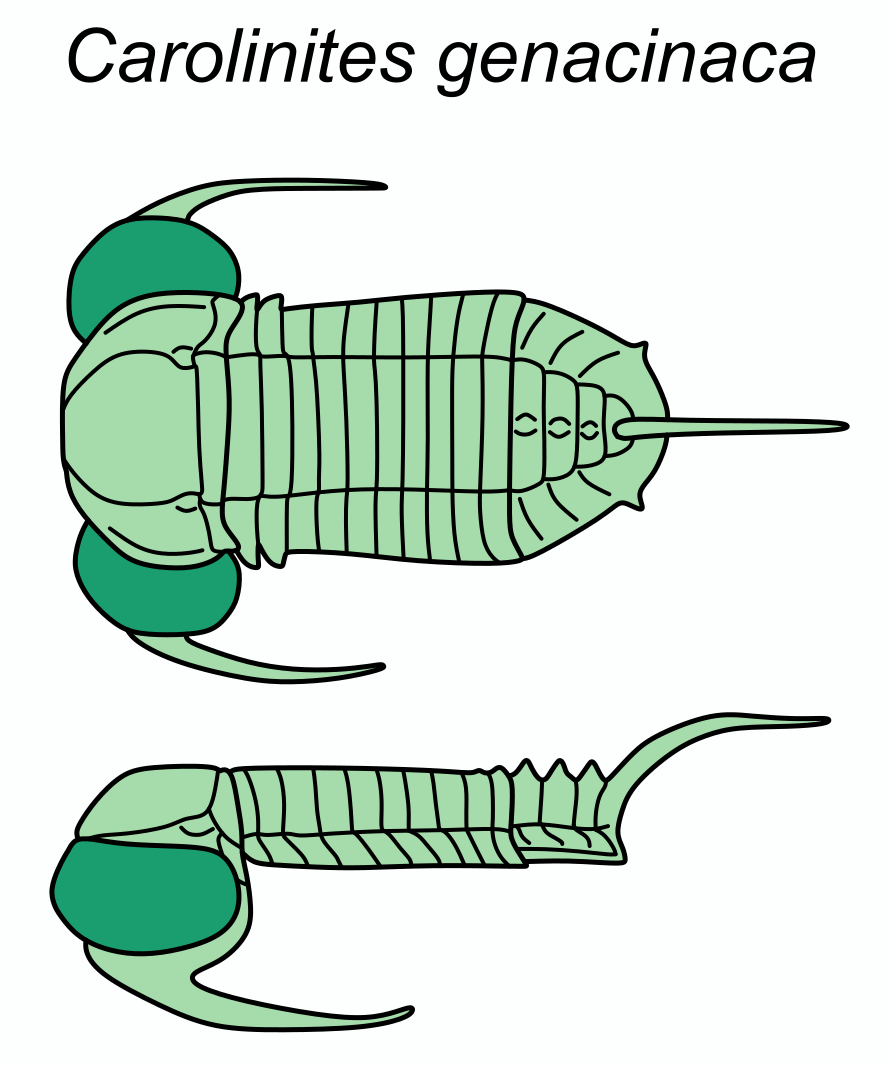
- Diagram (legs and antennae excluded)

Scientific classification
- Kingdom: Animalia
- Phylum: Arthropoda
- Clade: †Artiopoda
- Class: †Trilobita
- Order: †Proetida
- Family: †Telephinidae
- Genus: †Carolinites; Kobayashi, 1940

Type species
- Carolinites bulbosa Kobayashi, 1940

Species
- See text

Synonyms
- Dimastocephalus Stubblefield, 1950; Keidelia Harrington & Leanza, 1957

= Carolinites =

Carolinites Temporal range: Lower and Middle Ordovician

Extinct genus of trilobites

Carolinites is a genus of telephinid trilobite from the Lower and Middle Ordovician. Carolinites had a pantropical distribution, and there is evidence that it lived in upper parts of the water column. Thanks to its free-swimming lifestyle, Carolinites was one of the most widely-distributed trilobites, similar in habits to modern hyperiid amphipods. Due to its large eyes, Carolinites was not very streamlined, so it was probably a relatively slow head-first swimmer which relied on enrollment (curling up) for defense.

== Description ==
The librigena of Carolinites (its "free cheeks", or the outer edges of the head) are mostly encased by its huge eyes, which cover a wide field of view in most directions. Despite the size of these compound eyes, their numerous individual lenses are relatively narrow and closely-spaced, similar to modern crustaceans which are active in sunlit waters during the day. Carolinites's preference for the epipelagic zone (sunlit waters) is also supported by its preservation in both shallow and deep marine sediments. A deep sea trilobite would only sink and fossilize in deep sediments, a bottom-dwelling shallow-water trilobite would only fossilize in shallow sediments, but a free-swimming trilobite which lives in the epipelagic zone throughout the tropics could die, sink, and fossilize in both areas.

The eyes of Carolinites are widely-spaced, but some other pelagic trilobites (such as the deeper-water cyclopygids) have eyes which extend so far forwards that they merge into a visor-like structure. Apart from the eyes, the edge of the cephalon (head) provides the base for a pair of large genal spines, which extend downward, backward, and laterally (outward), gradually curving further backward. The glabella (central dome-like structure on the head) is boxy and slightly bulbous, extending to the front rim of the head. The occipital ring (a segment on the head immediately behind the glabella) is well-defined. Further transglabellar furrows (grooves embedded into the glabella) are lacking.

The rest of the body is relatively narrow and muscular. The thorax (body region) has 10 segments. The axis (central portion) of the pygidium (tail region) is highly vaulted and its rear end is steeply sloped. The pygidium has four segments, each bearing a large node at its center. In some Carolinites fossils, the node of the last segment develops into a long curved spine which emerges straight up, almost perpendicular to the midline, before curving back to end parallel to the midline.

== List of species ==
- C. ekphymosus Fortey, 1975
- C. genacinaca Ross, 1951 (synonyms: C. ichangensis, C. vizcainoi)
- C. indentus Ross and Barnes, 1967
- C. killaryensis (Stubblefield, 1950) (synonym: Dimastocephalus killaryensis)
- C. macrophthalma (Harrington and Leanza, 1957) (synonym: Keidelia macrophthalma)
- C. pardensis Legg, 1976
- C. rugosus Fortey, 1975
- C. sibiricus Chugaeva, 1964 (synonym: C. angustagena)
- C. tasmaniensis (Etheridge, 1919) (synonyms: C. bulbosa, C. bulbosus, C. genacinaca nevadensis)

Both C. tasmaniensis and C. genacinaca are globally widespread, and some studies argue that the latter species evolved from the former. The change in morphology between the two species follows a pattern which appears to be either random or complex enough to seem random. The sample size is not high enough to test a random walk model of gradualistic evolution. Carolinites was named after Caroline Creek in Tasmania, the type locality of C. bulbosa.

== Distribution ==
- C. ekphymosus: Svalbard, Australia, Western United States
- C. genacinaca: Western United States, East Greenland, East Siberia, Novaya Zemlya, Arctic Canada, Svalbard, China, France, Australia
- C. killaryensis: Western Ireland, Svalbard, Western United States (Basin Ranges).
- C. macrophthalma: Argentina
- C. pardensis: Argentina, Australia
- C. rugosus: Svalbard
- C. sibiricus: Western Ireland, Siberia, Svalbard, Western United States.
- C. tasmaniensis: Australia (Tasmania), Canada (Alberta), Svalbard, Western United States
