= Emmrichops =

Emmrichops Temporal range: Middle Ordovician (Llandeilo)

Scientific classification
- Domain: Eukaryota
- Kingdom: Animalia
- Phylum: Arthropoda
- Class: †Trilobita
- Order: †Asaphida
- Family: †Cyclopygidae
- Genus: †Emmrichops; Marek, 1961

Species
- E. planicephala Marek,1961 (type) synonym E. extensus

Extinct genus of trilobites

Emmrichops is a genus of average size trilobite (about 6 centimetres or 2.4 inches), assigned to the Cyclopygidae family, that lived during the Middle Ordovician (Llanvirn), and have been found in what are today the Czech Republic and in Wales. Like other cyclopygids, it has huge eyes, that occupy almost the entire free cheeks (or librigenae), six thorax segments and a wide tail shield. Like the other cyclopygids, Emmrichops probably lived hunting plankton in the water column. Only one species, E. planicephala, has been described sofar.

== Etymology ==
Emmrichops was named in honor of the German geologist Hermann Emmrich (1815–1879).

== Distribution ==
- Emmrichops planicephala is known from the Ordovician of Wales (Hustedograptus teretiusculus biozone, Llanfawr Mudstones Formation, Builth inlier, Llandeilian Stage of the Llanvirn Series) and the Czech Republic (Dobrotiva Formation, near Svatá Dobrotivá, Vokovice and Veleslavín, all Prague Basin).
