= Hermann Friedrich Emmrich =

German geologist

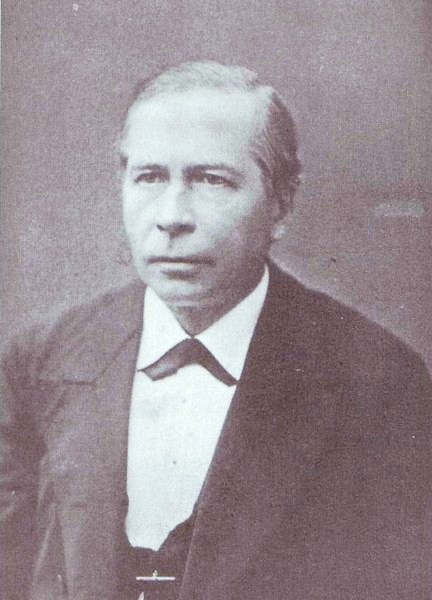
Hermann Friedrich Emmrich

Hermann Friedrich Emmrich (Meiningen, February 7, 1815 – Meiningen, 24 January 1879) was a German geologist.

He received his Ph.D. in philosophy and taught at the Institute of Meiningen (Henfling-Gymnasium Meiningen).

He described the trilobite genera Phacops, Odontopleura and Trinucleus.

He published Zur Naturgeschichte der Trilobiten (On the natural history of trilobites) in 1839 and Geologischem Geschichte des Alpes (Geological history of the Alps) in 1874.

The trilobite genus Emmrichops was named in his honor.
