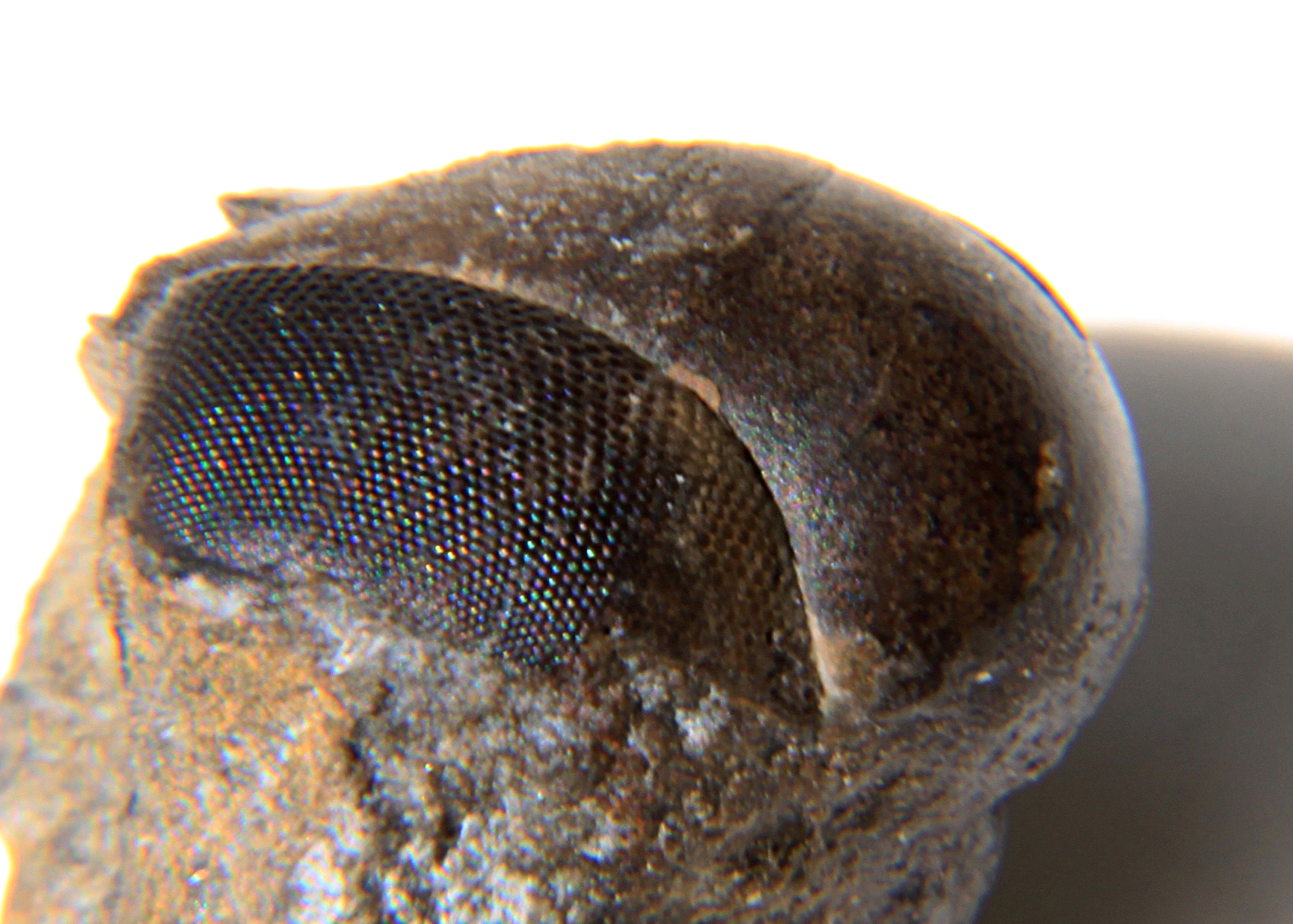
- Cyclopyge sp., cephalon 13 mm (0.51 in) long Alnif, Morocco

Scientific classification
- Kingdom: Animalia
- Phylum: Arthropoda
- Clade: †Artiopoda
- Class: †Trilobita
- Order: †Asaphida
- Family: †Cyclopygidae
- Genus: †Cyclopyge; Hawle & Corda, 1847

Type species
- Egle rediviva

Species
- C. rediviva (Barrande, 1846); C. recurva Lu, 1962

Synonyms
- Egle Barrande, 1846 non Egle Desvoidy, 1830; Aeglina

= Cyclopyge (trilobite) =

Cyclopyge Temporal range: Ordovician

Extinct genus of trilobites

Cyclopyge is a genus of small to average size trilobites that lived during the Ordovician. Like all members of the family Cyclopigidae, it has very large convex eyes, that cover most of the free cheeks, and in some species touch each other. The eyes almost touch the large glabella. The occipital ring has merged with the rest of the glabella. The glabella does not extend into a frontal thorn. The cephalon lacks genal spines. The 6 thorax segments have short pleurae. The pygidium is rather large, and often rather effaced. These are features that also occur in other Cyclopygidae, and are indications of a pelagic lifestyle.

== Taxonomy ==
The genus was first named Egle by Barrande, but that name was not available, since it was used by Robineau-Desvoidy before for a willow catkin fly of the Anthomyiidae family.

=== Species previously assigned to Cyclopyge ===
- C. binodosa = Pricyclopyge binodosa
- C. genatenta = Prospectatrix genatenta

=== Species that may be confused with Cyclopyge ===
- The agnostid trilobite Pseudagnostus cyclopyge, or previously known as Agnostus cyclopyge.
- The agnostid trilobite Rhaptagnostus cyclopygeformis, or previously known as Agnostus cyclopygeformis.
- The butterfly previously known as Cyclopyge Mielke, 2002.
- The millipede Rhamphidarpoides cyclopyge, belonging to the Spirostreptida order.

== Distribution ==
As pelagic creatures, cyclogygids were not bound to shallow waters surrounding continents and islands. At the time they lived, continents weren't blocking the exchange between different parts of the ocean, and this means they probably had large distributions, comprising one or more climate zones worldwide. Cyclopyge is well known from the Czech Republic, Morocco, England, Sweden, Canada (Newfoundland) and the United States.

- Cyclopyge recurva occurs in the Ordovician of China (Pagoda Formation of southwestern Shaanxi).
