= Aspidaeglina =

Aspidaeglina Temporal range: Ordovician (Arenig)

Scientific classification
- Domain: Eukaryota
- Kingdom: Animalia
- Phylum: Arthropoda
- Class: †Trilobita
- Order: †Asaphida
- Family: †Cyclopygidae
- Genus: †Aspidaeglina; Holub, 1911

Type species
- Aspidaeglina miranda

Species
- A. miranda Holub, 1911; A. striata (Lu, 1975)

Extinct genus of trilobites

Aspidaeglina is an extinct genus from a well-known class of fossil marine arthropods, the trilobites. It lived during the early part of the Arenig stage of the Ordovician Period, a faunal stage which lasted from approximately 473 to 470 million years ago.

== Distribution ==
- A. miranda is known from the Lower Ordovician of the Czech Republic (Arenig, Klabava Formation).
- A. striata occurs in the Lower Ordovician of China (Pagoda Formation of southwestern Shaanxi).
