= Sagavia =

Sagavia Temporal range: Middle and Upper Ordovician

Scientific classification
- Kingdom: Animalia
- Phylum: Arthropoda
- Clade: †Artiopoda
- Class: †Trilobita
- Order: †Asaphida
- Family: †Cyclopygidae
- Genus: †Sagavia; Koroleva, 1967

Species
- See text

Extinct genus of trilobites

Sagavia is a genus of trilobites that lived during the Middle and Upper Ordovician in what are now Northwest and Southeast China, North Kazakhstan and Wales. It is a typical cyclopygid that can be distinguished by its large but separate eyes, elongated glabella, five thorax segments and a pygidium with clearly defined axis and border.

== Species and distribution ==
- S. chuanxiensis (Li & Xiao, 1984) (synonym Microparia (Microparia) chuanxiensis) is found in the Middle and Upper Ordovician of China (late Caradoc-Ashgill, top of the Pagoda Formation, limestone block in a Triassic melange accumulation at Shiqu; Yuanba, Hougou and Liangshan, Nanzheng; Dangmengou and Zhuyegou, Ningqiang; Qishuba and Gaoqiaogou, Mianxian; all Northwestern Sichuan).
- S. elongata Petrunina, 1975 is present in the Upper Ordovician of China (?Ashgill, Kielanella-Tretaspis Beds of the Ulugtay District, south Tien Shan).
- S. felix Koroleva, 1967 (type) has been collected from the Middle Ordovician of Kazakhstan (Caradoc, Nemagraptus gracilis Zone, Saga Formation, Saga River section, Stepnyak district).
- S. glans Fortey & Owens, 1987 was excavated from the Upper Ordovician of the United Kingdom (late Arenig, Pontyfenni Formation, South Wales).
- S. heterocyclopygeformis Koroleva, 1982 is known from the Middle Ordovician of northern Kazakhstan (Caradoc).
- S. modica Koroleva, 1967 is known from the Middle Ordovician of Kazakhstan (Caradoc, Nemagraptus gracilis Zone, Saga Formation, Saga River section, Stepnyak district).
- S. novakellaformis Koroleva, 1982 occurs at the Koroleva from the Middle Ordovician of northern Kazakhstan (late Llanvirn?), and the United Kingdom (Hustedograptus teretiusculus Biozone of the Llanfawn Mudstone Formation, central Wales).
- S. zhuyegouensis Koroleva, 1982 occurs at the Middle Ordovician of China (late Caradoc, Dangmengou, Ningqiang Northwestern Sichuan).

== Description ==
The glabella of Sagavia is elongate with parallel sides or slightly converging towards the front. The large eyes are separated at the front by the glabella and the cephalic doublure. The rostral suture is vaulted upwards. It has a thorax of five segments. Sagavia has a pygidium with well a defined axis and border with clear furrows.

=== Differences with related genera ===
- Sagavia is similar to Microparia but has a more elongate glabella and much better defined pygidial axis and border.
- Heterocyclopyge also has a defined pygidial axis, a five-segmented thorax, and a defined pygidial border, but has a shorter glabella and the pygidial border and axis are poorly defined medially.
