= Circulocrania =

Circulocrania Temporal range: Early Ordovician (Floian)

Scientific classification
- Domain: Eukaryota
- Kingdom: Animalia
- Phylum: Arthropoda
- Class: †Trilobita
- Order: †Asaphida
- Family: †Cyclopygidae
- Genus: †Circulocrania; Fortey & Owens, 1987

Extinct genus of trilobites

Circulocrania is an extinct genus of trilobites in the family Cyclopygidae. The genus lived during the later part of the Arenig stage of the Ordovician Period, approximately 478 to 471 million years ago.
