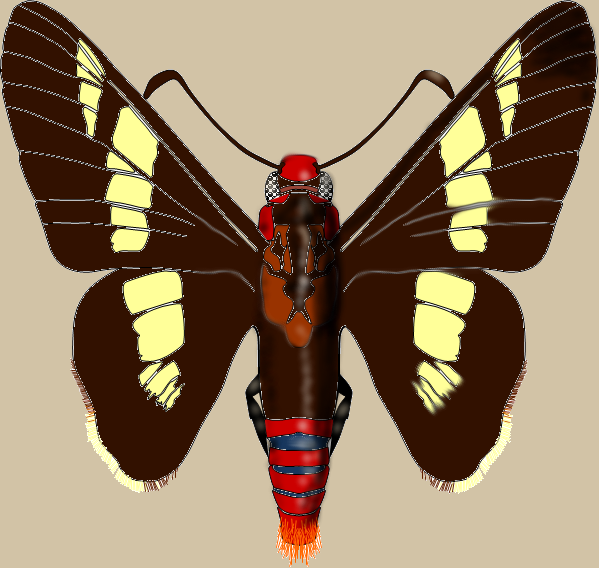
- Olafia roscius iphimedia

Scientific classification
- Kingdom: Animalia
- Phylum: Arthropoda
- Class: Insecta
- Order: Lepidoptera
- Family: Hesperiidae
- Tribe: Pyrrhopygini
- Genus: Olafia; Nemesio, 2005
- Species: O. roscius

Binomial name
- Olafia roscius (Hopffer, 1874)

Synonyms
- Cyclopyge Mielke, 2002 (homonym of Cyclopyge Hawle & Corda, 1847, a trilobite); Pyrrhopyge roscius Hopffer, 1874 (type); Oxynetra roscius; Cyclopyge roscius; Oxynetra rufocincta Hayward, 1932; Pyrrhopyga erythrosoma Mabille, 1891

= Olafia =

Genus of butterflies

Olafia is a genus of skippers in the family Hesperiidae. It contains only one species, Olafia roscius, which is found in Brazil and Argentina.

== Subspecies ==
- O. roscius roscius (Hopffer, 1874) (Brazil, Argentina)
- O. roscius flavomaculata (Bell, 1937) (Brazil: Santa Catarina)
- O. roscius iphimedia (Plötz, 1886) (Brazil)

== Etymology ==
The genus is named in honour of entomologist Olaf H.H. Mielke.
