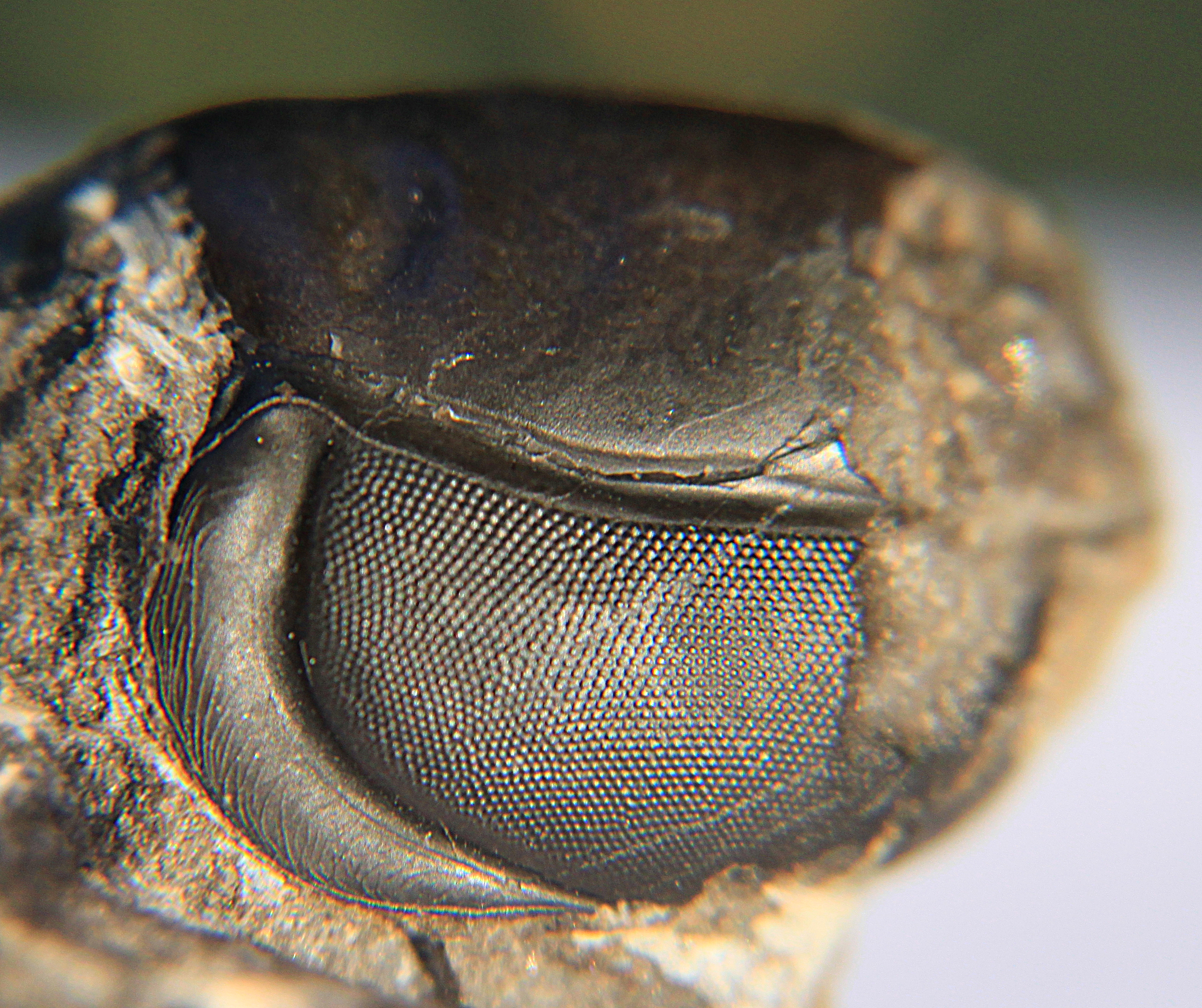
- Cyclopygid cephalon, probably Symphysops stevaninae, 24mm, lateral view

Scientific classification
- Kingdom: Animalia
- Phylum: Arthropoda
- Clade: †Artiopoda
- Class: †Trilobita
- Order: †Asaphida
- Superfamily: †Cyclopygoidea
- Family: †Cyclopygidae; Raymond, 1925

Subfamilies
- Cyclopyginae Raymond, 1925; Pricyclopyginae Fortey & Owens, 1987; Ellipsotaphrinae Kobayashi & Hamada, 1971; And see text for genera

= Cyclopygidae =

Cyclopygidae Temporal range: Ordovician

Extinct family of trilobites

Cyclopygidae is a family of asaphid trilobites from the Ordovician. Cyclopygids had an extratropical distribution, and there is evidence that they lived in darker parts of the water column (around 175m deep). Cyclopygids are characterized by enlarged eyes, with a wide angle of view, both horizontal and vertical, reminiscent of the eyes of dragonflies. These typically touch the glabella directly on the side. Cyclopygids all lack genal spines, but Symphysops carries a forward directed frontal spine on the glabella. It is presumed that at least the members of the genus Pricyclopyge swam upside down and had bioluminescent organs on the third thorax segment. Cyclopygids had between 7 and 5 thorax segments, a wide and stout axis, and short side lobes (or pleurae).

== Taxonomy ==
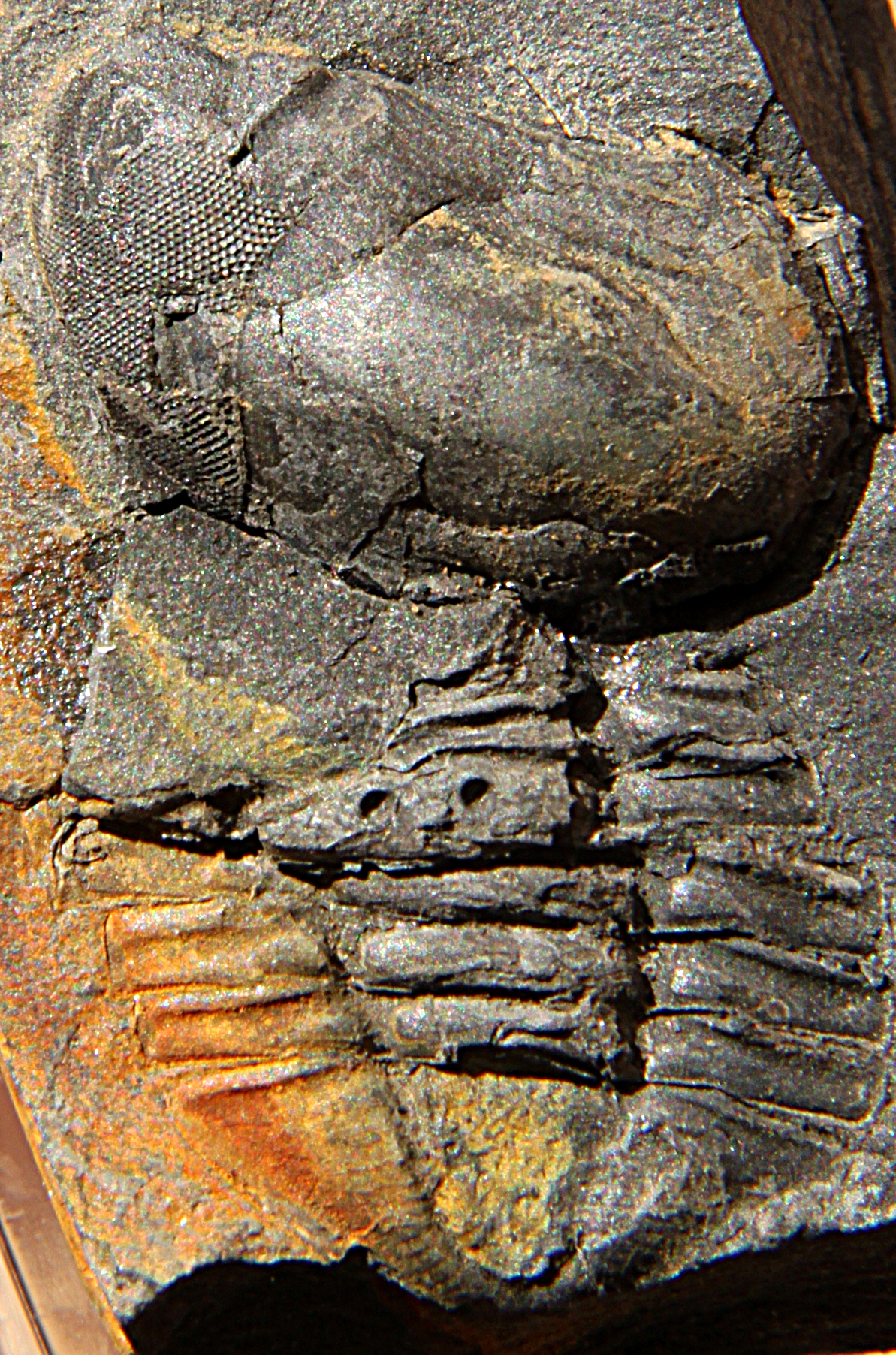
Pricyclopyge binodosa, 24mm long, with two characteristic disc shaped hollows on the 3rd thorax segment

The genera of Cyclopygidae are grouped into the following subfamilies:

- Cyclopyginae
  - Cyclopyge Hawle & Corda, 1847
  - Delgamella Marek, 1961
  - Gastropolus Whittard, 1966
  - Heterocyclopyge Marek, 1961
  - Microparia Hawle & Corda, 1847
  - Novakella Whittard, 1952?
  - Prospectatrix Fortey, 1981
  - Sagavia Koroleva, 1967
- Ellipsotaphrinae
  - EIlipsotaphrus Whittard, 1952
  - Psilacella Whittard, 1952
- Pricyclopyginae
  - Pricyclopyge Richter & Richter, 1954
  - Circulocrania Fortey, 1987
  - Emmrichops Marek, 1961
  - Symphysops Raymond, 1925
- Assignment unclear
  - Aspidaeglina Holub, 1911
  - Phylacops Cooper & Kindle, 1936
  - Xenocyclopyge Lu, 1962
- Genera previously assigned to Cyclopygidae
  - Girvanopyge (Remopleurididae)

== Extinction ==
The extinction ending the Ordovician was one of the most radical for life to have experienced, and the trilobites were heavily affected. Those with pelagic or deep water benthic life styles (such as species in Olenidae and Agnostida) died out. Also those trilobites having planktonic larvae became extinct, and these include most of the superfamilies in the order Asaphida, save for Trinucleoidea. A reduction in diversity already occurred before this major extinction, but many families persisted into the Hirnantian, and it is possible that they would quickly have been restored to their former diversity. The crisis that started the Silurian must have exceptionally severe, and was associated with low oxygen levels in the oceans after an ice age.

== Description ==
Cyclopygids have particularly large eyes with a wide angle view, also vertically, that occupy most of the free cheeks, and the fixed cheeks absent or reduced to a very narrow strip at the sides of the glabella, and a zone between the both eyes. In the earliest cyclopygids (Prospectatrix) the eyes are less enlarged, but in some later taxa, eyes are so big they have even fused. The most backward lobe of the glabella (the occipital ring) cannot be identified, except in the Ellipsotaphrinae subfamily. Further furrows crossing the glabella may be absent or are reduced to pairs of slight depressions. Genal spines are lacking. Cyclopygids have between 5 and 7 thorax segments. The pleurae become successively wider further back, making the thorax widest across the last segment.

=== Eyes ===
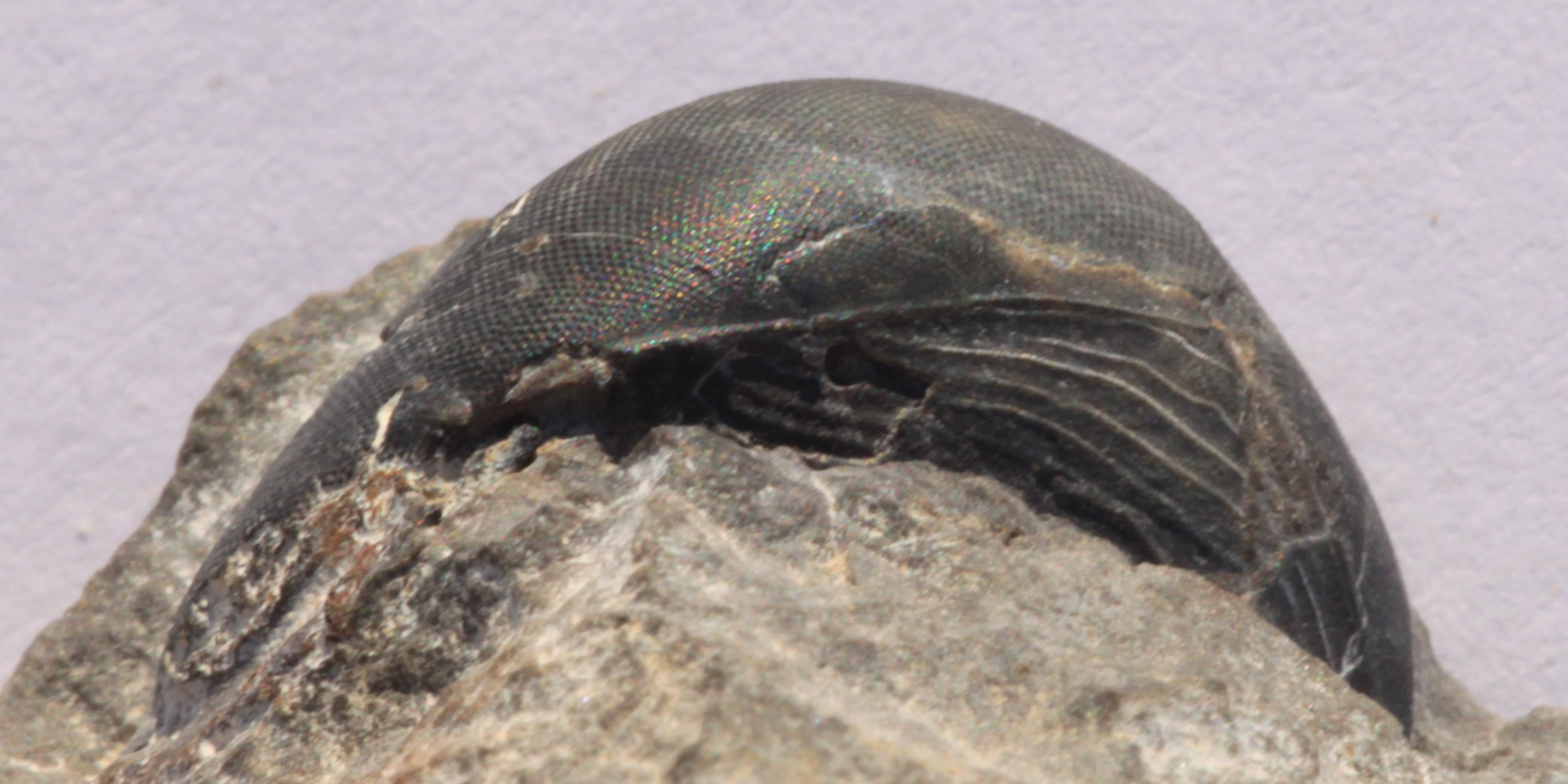
fused eyes of a Symphysops sp., visual surface 30mm wide following the curve of the eyes, and 10 mm high, oblique view, collected near Zagora, Morocco

In pelagic trilobites, such as the species in the proetid family Telephinidae, and in Cyclopygidae, as in many extant pelagic crustaceans, the eyes are particularly large and have very wide angles of view, both horizontal and vertical. This is in stark contrast to contemporary benthic trilobites, that may have an extensive horizontal angle of view, but always have a limited vertical angle of view.

In a few species of the genera Cyclopyge, Microparia, Ellipsotaphrus, Pricyclopyge and in Symphysops the eyes are merged in front of the head creating a visor. This development improves the sensitivity of the eye for objects that move relative to the eye, which might have been particularly useful under low-light conditions and when rapidly moving. The extant hyperiid amphipod Cystisoma also has such fused eyes. Monocular trilobites are always younger than closely related species with normal paired eyes, and is an example of a trend that occurred several times in parallel. Only in Pricyclopyge binodosa several stages in this development can be seen as a consecutive series of subspecies collected from successive zones in the late Arenig to the Llanvirn. Although the distance between the eyes varies within any one population of the earlier subspecies, the eyes only touch and merge in P. binodosa synophthalma.

== Ecology ==
Cyclopygids are absent from shallow water strata, such as alluvial and calcareous deposits. They are not found together with well-sighted benthic trilobite species or corals. They do occur with blind or nearly blind benthic trilobites, a typical adaptation to a lightless environment, and oceanic free-floating graptolites. Hence, cyclopygids are considered to have been confined to deeper water, swimming at the lower limit of the photic zone (or mesopelagic), but still high above the benthic species they were deposited with. This is also evidenced by the presumed present of bioluminescent organs on the third thorax segment of Pricyclopyge, which also occur on the functional underside of extant mesopelagic species. This is why it is assumed Pricyclopyge may have swum upside down. Very large, convex eyes and a narrow zone of thoracic pleurae are typical for all Cyclopygidae, and are indications of a pelagic lifestyle. The stout exoskeleton is consistent with rapid swimming and it is likely cyclopygids actively hunted zooplankton.
