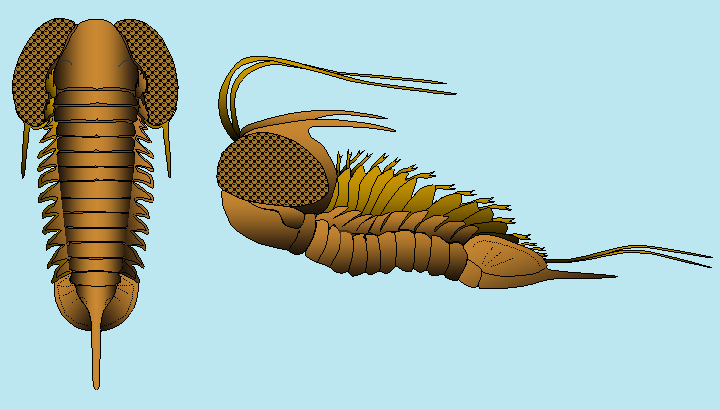
- Opipeuterella, reconstruction in dorsal view and swimming

Scientific classification
- Kingdom: Animalia
- Phylum: Arthropoda
- Clade: †Artiopoda
- Class: †Trilobita
- Order: †Proetida
- Superfamily: †Bathyuroidea
- Family: †Telephinidae; Marek, 1952

Genera and subgenera
- Telephina (Telephina) Marek 1952; Telephina (Telephops) Nicolaisen, 1963; Carolinites Kobayashi, 1940; Carrickia Tripp, 1965; Goniophrys Ross, 1951; Oopsites Fortey, 1975; Opipeuterella Fortey, 2005 = Opipeuter Fortey, 1974, non Opipeuter Uzzell, 1969, a lizard, now included in Proctoporus

Synonyms
- Telephidae; Carrickiinae

= Telephinidae =

Telephinidae Temporal range: Ordovician

Extinct family of trilobites

Telephinidae is a family of pelagic trilobites with large wide-angle eyes, occupying most of the free cheeks, downward directed facial spines and 9-10 thorax segments. The family is known during the entire Ordovician and occurred in deep water around the globe.

== Distribution ==
The Telephinidae probably evolved from a species assigned to the Hystricuridae. Telephinids first occur during the late Tremadocian, with Carolinites and Opipeuterella being globally very common at low latitudes by the end of the Floian. Carolinites survived into the Darriwilian, at which time a second major radiation occurred, that includes Telephina and Telephops, and these genera only became extinct at the end of the Ordovician.

== Description ==
The central raised area of the headshield (or glabella) is strongly convex. The most backward segment (called occipital ring) is wide and is defined by a deep furrow. No further segments can be determined in front of the occipital ring, but sometimes 2-4 pairs of muscle impressions are visible, of which the one just in front of the occipital ring may be deepened at its inner end (in some Telephina species) to form a lengthwise furrow. The fixed cheeks have broad palpebral lobes (between the eye and the glabella) that take up most of the length of headshield. The frontal border of the headshield is arched, with a circular cross section, or modified to form a pair of short spines. The free cheeks curve strongly downwards and have prominent borders, particularly to the side and the back, and these bear long tube- or blade-like genal spines. The articulating middle part of the body (or thorax) consists of 9 or 10 segments. The axis is extremely convex and the side-lobes (or pleurae) are narrow. The tailshield (or pygidium) is convex and its axis is prominent and has 2-4 rings. The most backward piece may bear a long spine. The seam of the exoskeleton (or doublure) is narrow.

=== Differences with the Cyclopygidae ===
Cyclopigids lack genal spines and palpebral lobes. Their thorax has 5 to 7 segments. The occipital ring is present only in the Ellipsotaphrinae subfamily.

== Ecology ==
Like the contemporary but unrelated Cyclopygidae, Telephinidae occur with blind or nearly blind benthic trilobites, a typical adaptation to a lightless environment, and oceanic free-floating graptolites. Telephinidae however also occur with sighted benthic trilobites and other organisms. Comparison of the angles and densities of the facets shows that the eyes of the Telephinidae were less adapted to low-light levels and therefore cyclopygids are considered to have been confined to deeper water, swimming at the lower limit of the photic zone (or mesopelagic). This implies Telephinidae lived higher up in the water column, possibly hunting plankton. Because of the weight, Telephinidae probably swam back-down.
