= Prospectatrix =

Prospectatrix Temporal range: Tremadocian

Scientific classification
- Kingdom: Animalia
- Phylum: Arthropoda
- Clade: †Artiopoda
- Class: †Trilobita
- Order: †Asaphida
- Family: †Cyclopygidae
- Genus: †Prospectatrix; Fortey, 1981

Type species
- Cyclopyge genatenta

Species
- P. genatenta (Stubblefield, 1927); P. exquisita Zhou, McNamara, Yuan & Zhang,1994; P. superciliata (Dean, 1973)

Extinct genus of trilobites

Prospectatrix is a genus of trilobites of average size, that lived in the Lower Ordovician and is probably ancestral to the other genera of the Cyclopygidae family. Its eyes are only moderately enlarged and it has six or seven thorax segments.

== Etymology ==
Prospectatrix is derived from the Latin, meaning “early observer”, expressing that this genus was an early representative of the extremely well-sighted cyclopygids. The species epithet is derived from the Latin exquisita, meaning excellent, refers to the well preserved type specimens.

== Distribution ==
- P. genatenta occurs in the Lower Ordovician of the United Kingdom (Upper Tremadocian, Shumardia (Conophrys) salopiensis Zone, Shineton Shale, Shineton, Shropshire; Bergamia rushtoni biozone, Pontyfeni Formation, Whitland, Carmarthen District, Wales), Argentina (Tremadoc, Portezuelo de La Alumbrera Creek, Famatina Range, Upper Volcancito Formation, La Rioja).
- P. exquisita has been found in the Lower Ordovician of northwest China (Dichelepyge sinensis Zone, upper Torsuqtagh Group northeastern Tarim, Xinjiang).
- P. brevior is known from the Lower Ordovician of the United Kingdom (Tremadocian, Skiddaw Group fauna, Lake District).
- P. superciliata (synonym Pricyclopyge superciliata) from the Lower Ordovician of Turkey.
