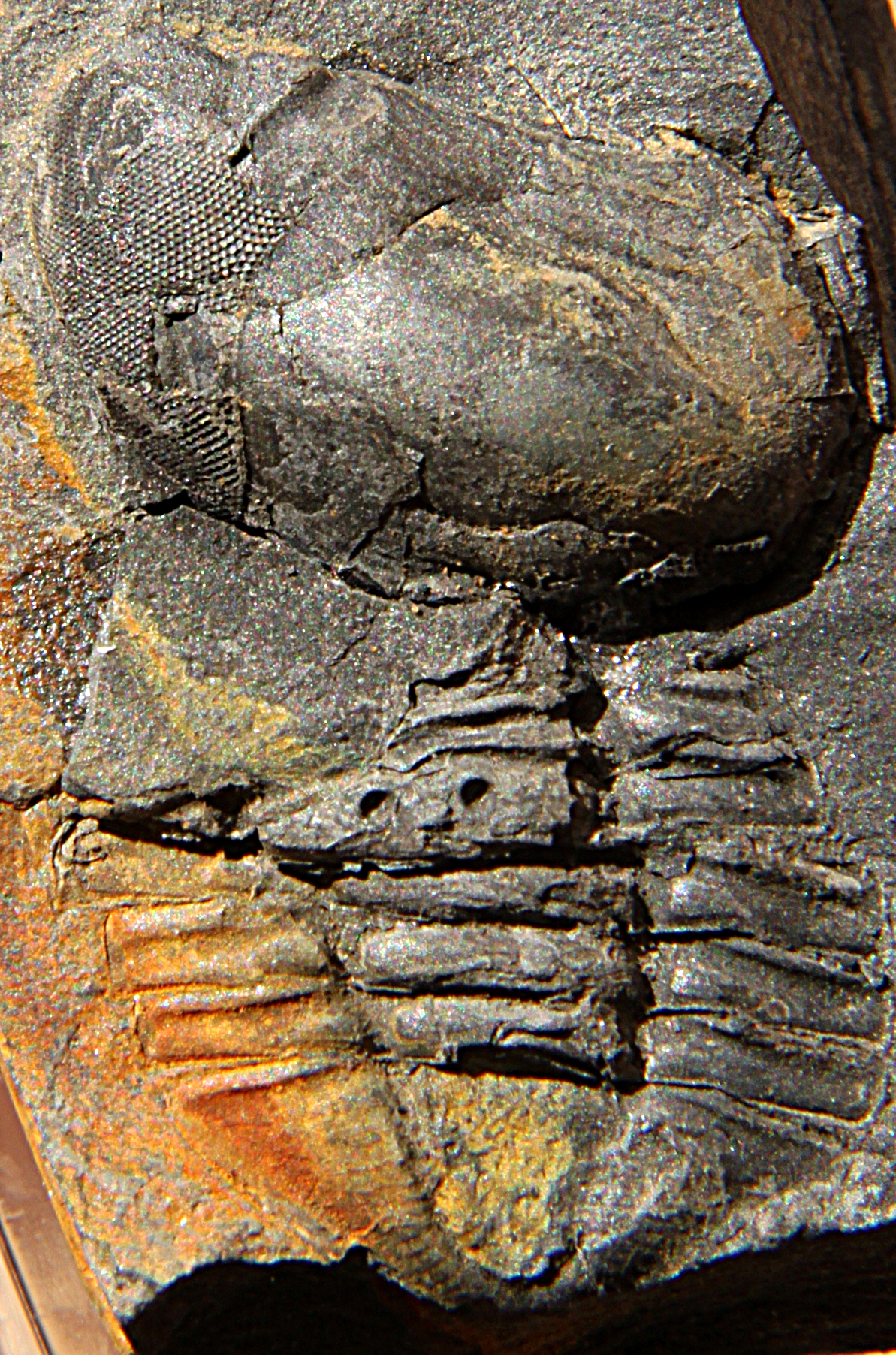
- P. binodosa

Scientific classification
- Domain: Eukaryota
- Kingdom: Animalia
- Phylum: Arthropoda
- Class: †Trilobita
- Order: †Asaphida
- Family: †Cyclopygidae
- Genus: †Pricyclopyge; Richter & Richter, 1954

Type species
- Aeglina prisca

Species
- P. prisca (Barrande, 1872); P. binodosa (Salter, 1859); P. b. binodosa; P. b. eurycephala Fortey & Owens, 1987; P. b. synophthalma (Koucek, 1916)

= Pricyclopyge =

Pricyclopyge Temporal range: Ordovician

Extinct genus of trilobites

Pricyclopyge is a genus of trilobites assigned to the family Cyclopygidae that occurs throughout the Ordovician. Pricyclopyge had an extratropical distribution, and there is evidence that it lived in darker parts of the water column (around 175m deep). Pricyclopyge has huge eyes, an inverted pear-shaped glabella, six thorax segments, with on the 3rd two small discs. Pricyclopyge is known from what are today China, the Czech Republic, France, and the United Kingdom.

== Description ==
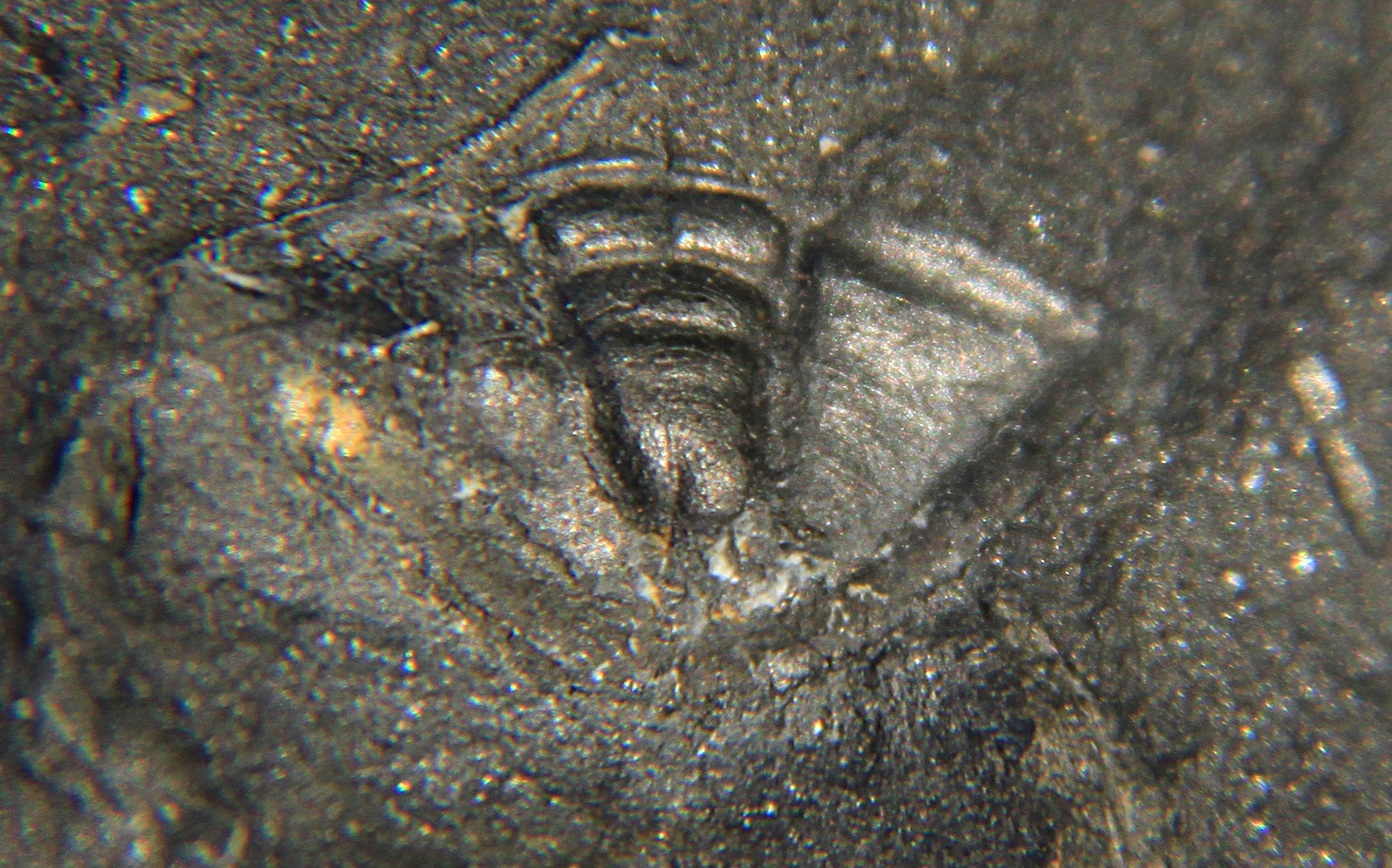
Pygidium of P. longicephala

Like other cyclopygids, Pricyclopyge lacks genal spines. Pricyclopyge has six thorax segments of which the third from the front carries two very characteristic round discs that are presumed to have been bioluminescent organs, and if true, this suggests that Pricyclopyge swam upside down. It has a wide and stout axis, that tapers gradually backwards until it ends in a semicircle close to the border of the pygidium. The short side lobes (or pleurae) of the thorax segments gradually become wider further back so that the thorax is widest at its back, with the tips of the pleurae of the 6th segment sometimes enlarged, bent backwards and so bordering the pygidium. The pygidium is more than twice as wide as long, the axis showing 3 or 4 clearly defined rings, while segmentation of the pleural area is barely visible. The pygidial border furrow is clear.

=== Eyes ===
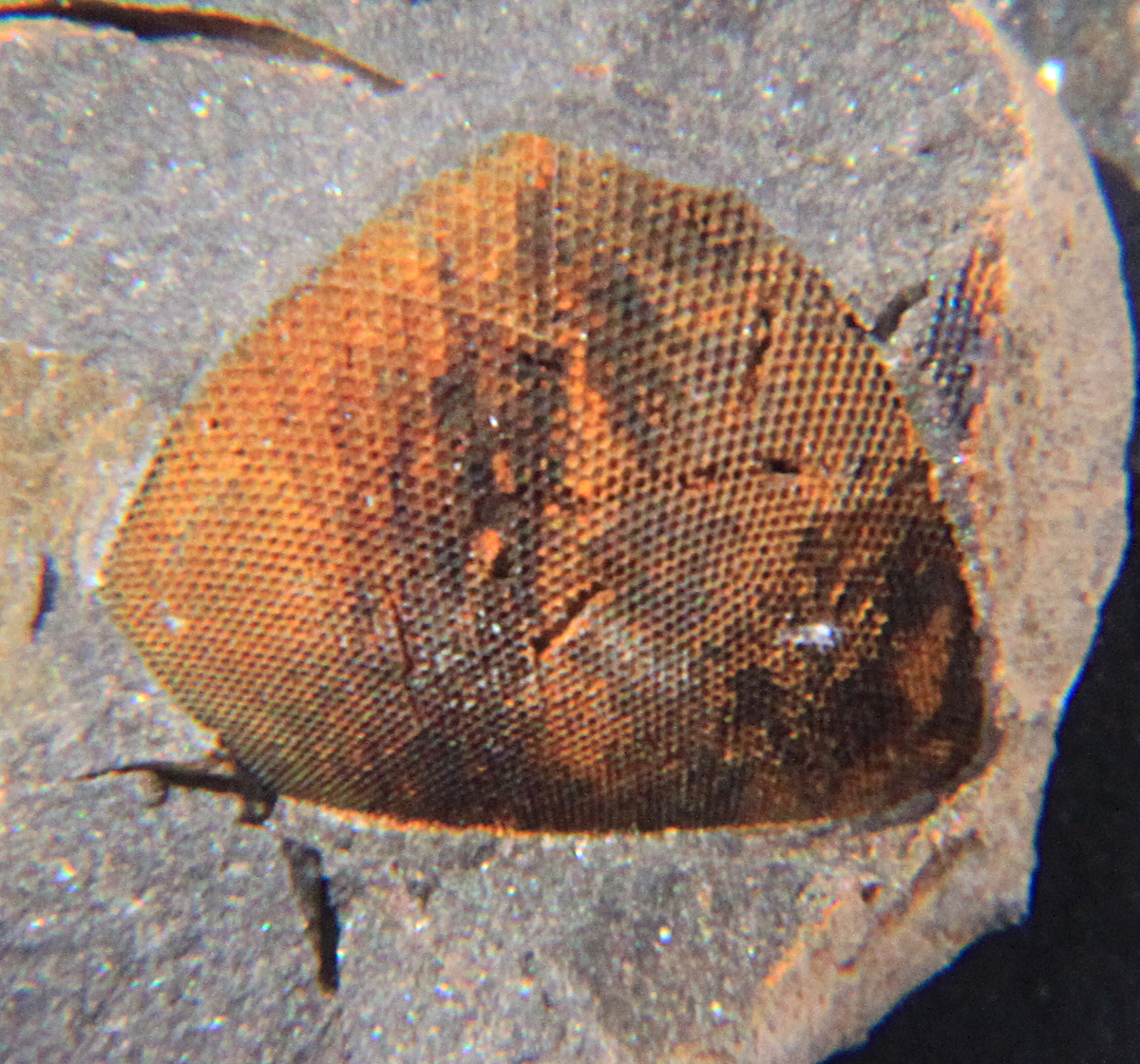
Eye of P. binodosa, lenses missing, showing the arrangement of the ommatidia

Like all cyclopygids, Pricyclopyge has huge eyes, that largely encircle the inverted pear-shaped glabella. These eyes have a wide angle of view, both horizontal and vertical, reminiscent of the eyes of dragonflies. The individual lenses in the eyes are hexagonally arranged, with their centers approximately 0.25 mm apart. Merger of both eyes, creating a visor, has appeared in several cyclopigid genera, but only in Pricyclopyge binodosa several stages in this development can be seen as a consecutive series of subspecies collected from successive zones in the late Arenig to the Llanvirn. This development improves the sensitivity of the eye for objects that move relative to the eye, which might have been particularly useful under low-light conditions and when rapidly moving. The extant hyperiid amphipod Cystisoma also has such fused eyes. Although the distance between the eyes varies within any one population of the earlier subspecies, the eyes only touch and merge in P. binodosa synophthalma. Monocular trilobites are always younger than closely related species with normal paired eyes, and is an example of a trend that occurred several times in parallel.

== Ecology ==
It is presumed that Pricyclopyge swam upside down in dimly lit oceanic waters outside the tropic belt. It occurs together with other cyclopygids, blind or nearly blind deepwater benthic trilobites, and free-floating oceanic graptolites. It probably hunted the zooplankton and may have migrated in the evening towards the surface and in the morning to greater depths, following prey and possibly avoiding some of its potential predators.
