= Paleontology in Wisconsin =

Paleontological research in the U.S. state of Wisconsin

The location of the state of Wisconsin

Paleontology in Wisconsin refers to paleontological research occurring within or conducted by people from the U.S. state of Wisconsin. The state has fossils from the Precambrian, much of the Paleozoic, some parts of the Mesozoic and the later part of the Cenozoic. Most of the Paleozoic rocks are marine in origin. Because of the thick blanket of Pleistocene glacial sediment that covers the rock strata in most of the state, Wisconsin’s fossil record is relatively sparse. In spite of this, certain Wisconsin paleontological occurrences provide exceptional insights concerning the history and diversity of life on Earth.

== Prehistory ==
=== Precambrian ===
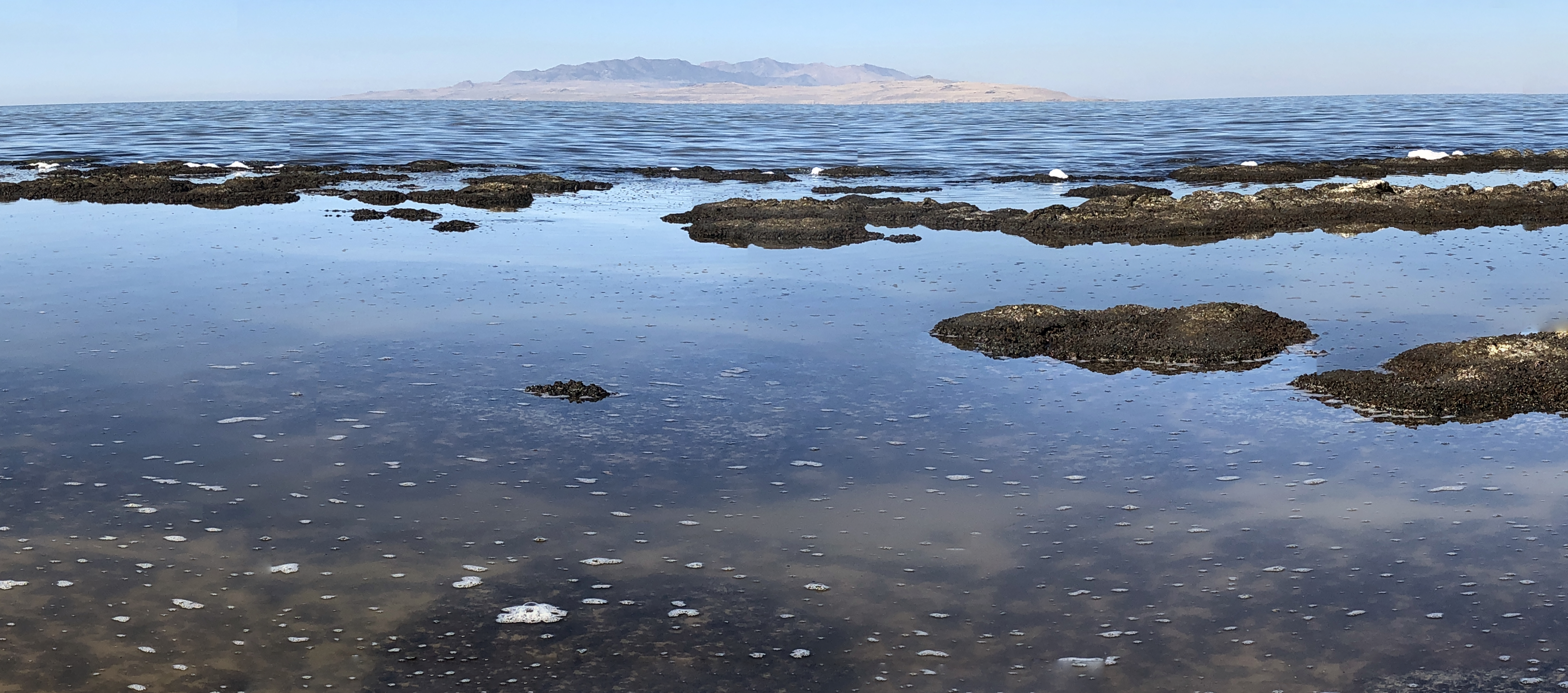
How earth possibly looked like during the Precambrian eon

Many metamorphic, igneous and sedimentary rock units are exposed in the north-central part of Wisconsin. Although they are mostly barren of fossils, some of the sedimentary ones contain stromatolites.

=== Cambrian ===
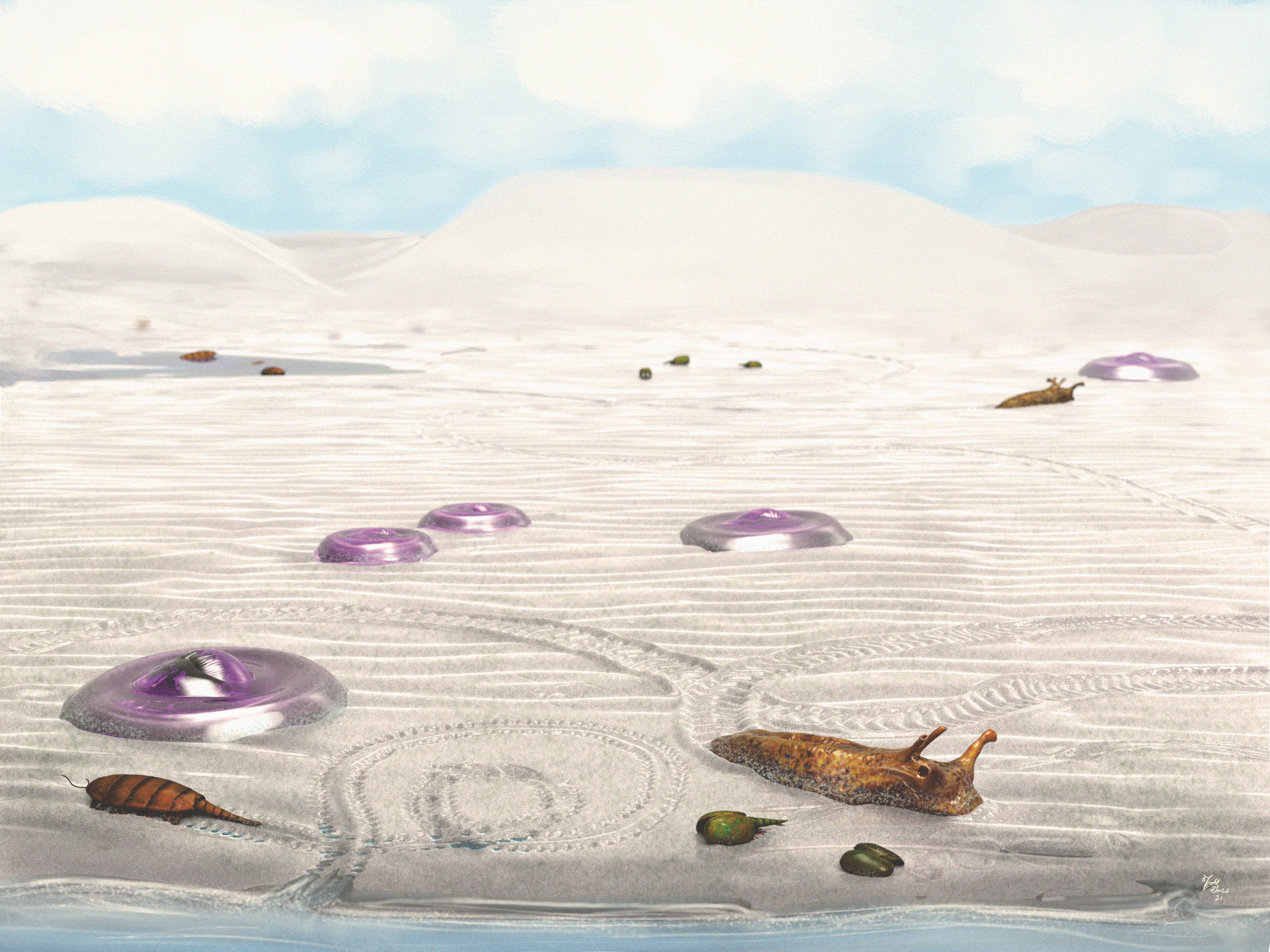
A reconstruction of the ecosystem at Blackberry hill, showing a variety of organisms. The purple circle shaped objects are stranded jellyfish, the arthropod on the lower left making the trackway Protichnites is the euthycarcinoid Mosineia, the bigger brown organisms are large slug like mollusks that are the supposed makers of the Climactichnites trails at the site. And the tiny arthropod near the bottom is the phyllocarid Arenosicaris.

Exposures of Cambrian rock units, many of which are fossiliferous, occur in western and central Wisconsin, especially along the banks of the Mississippi, Saint Croix and Wisconsin Rivers. Most of the rocks are Upper Cambrian; however, others are thought to be Middle Cambrian. Fossils of many groups of organisms have been found including stromatolites, conulariids, brachiopods, gastropods, monoplacophorans, trilobites, graptolites, and conodont elements. Wisconsin’s Cambrian rocks have also produced fossils of more aglaspidid (a grouping of arthropods closely related to trilobites) species (around 12) than those of any other state. A portion of central Wisconsin known as Blackberry Hill is a Konservat-Lagerstätte famous for its many types of trace fossils, mass strandings of jellyfish, and especially for producing fossils of one of the first animals to emerge from the sea and walk on land (i.e., a species of euthycarcinoid).

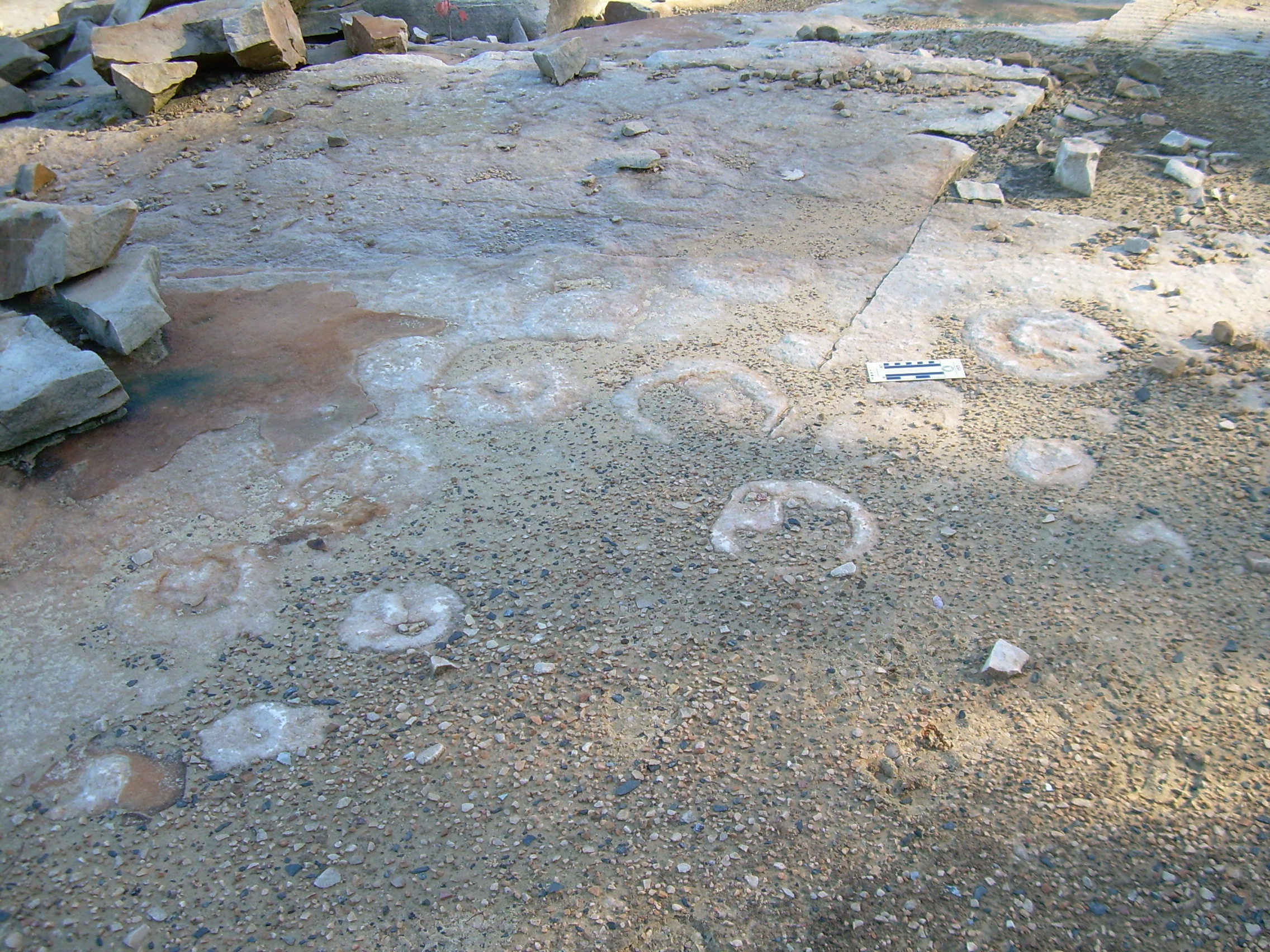
Stranded scyphozoans (jellyfish) at Blackberry Hill.

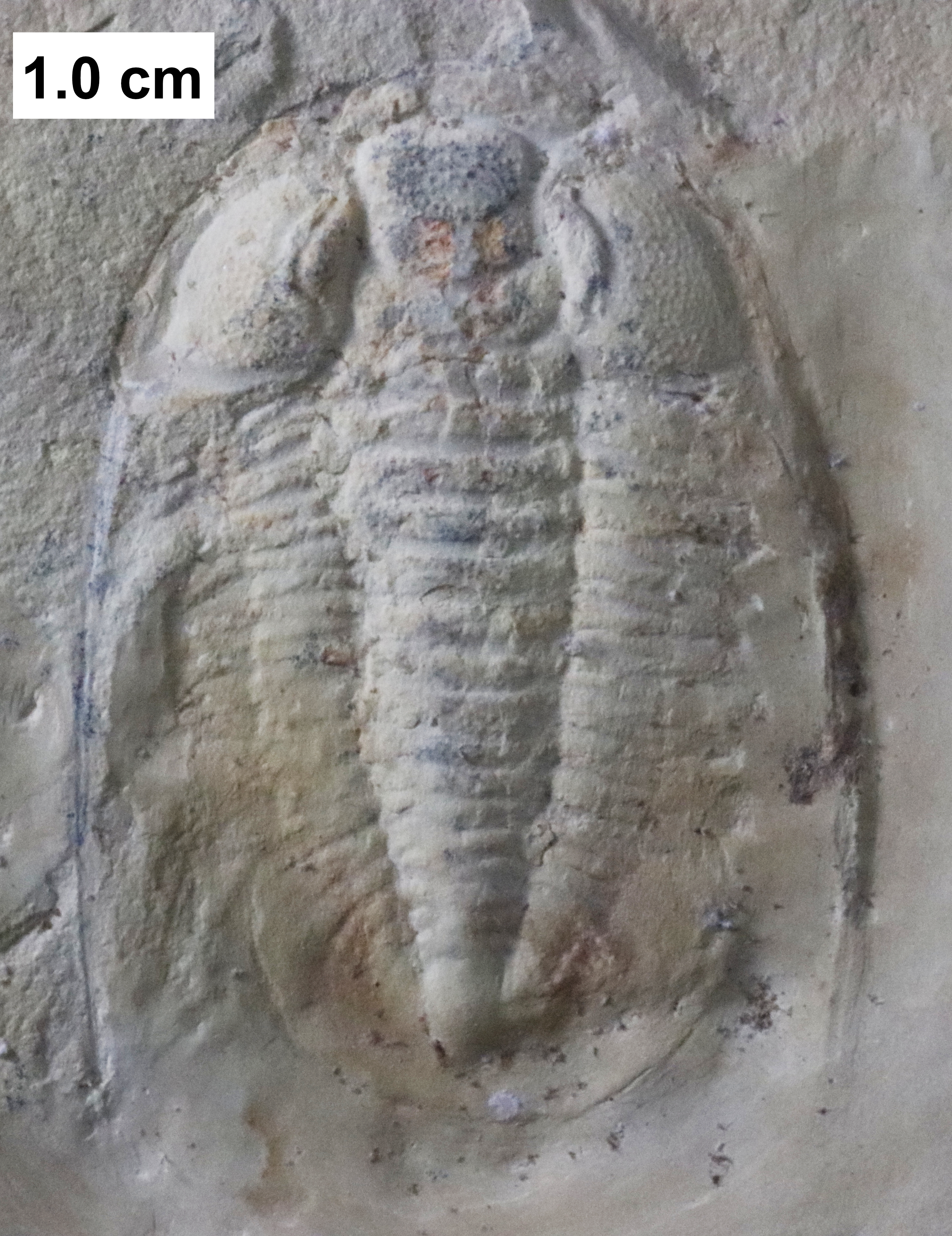
The Cambrian trilobite Prosaukia from Prairie du Sac.

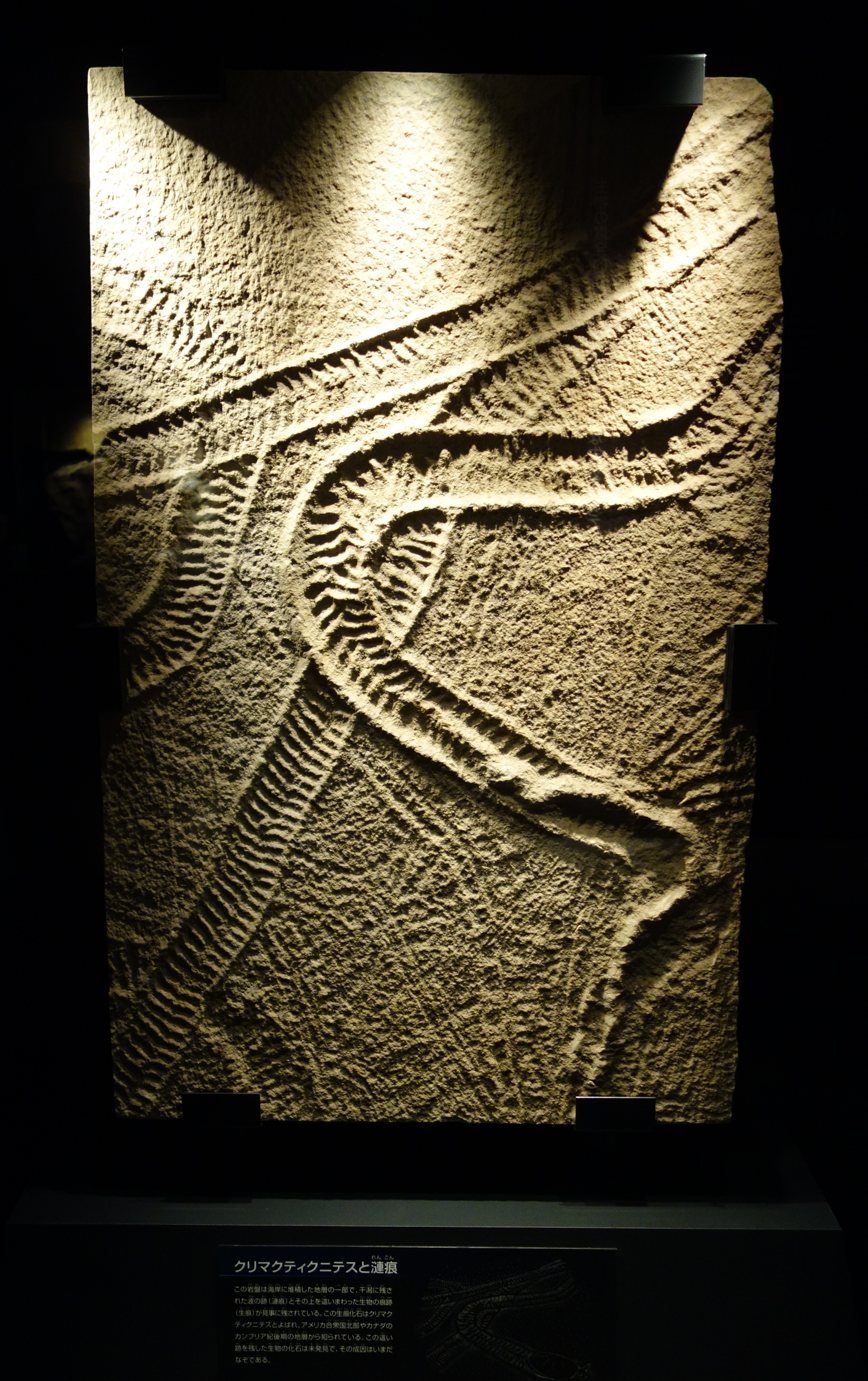
Climactichnites wilsoni, these trails were made by a large, slug-like mollusk at Blackberry Hill. These examples are about 10 cm wide.

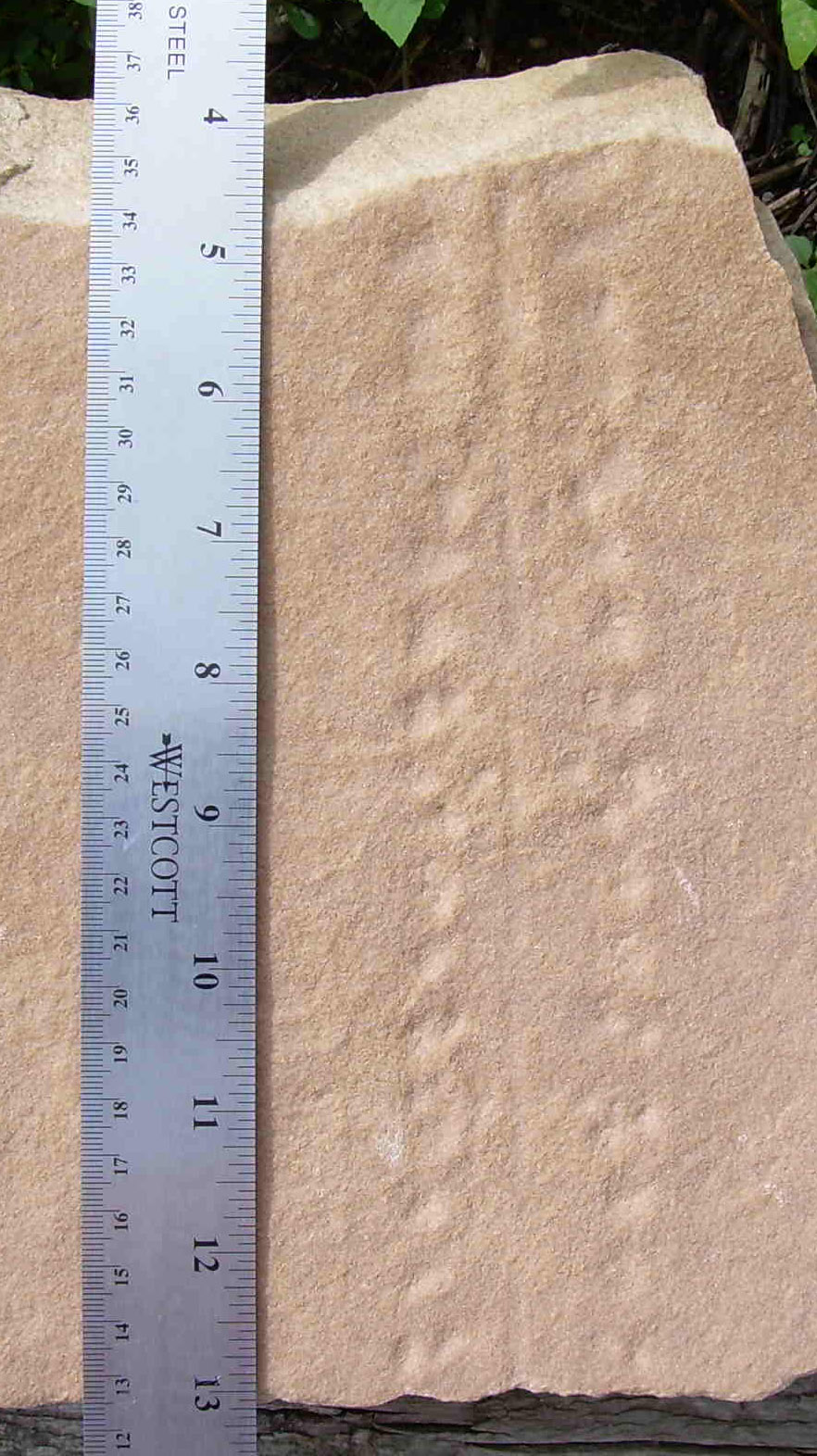
The trackway Protichnites from Blackberry Hill. These are believed to be some of the first footprints made on land. They were made by the euthycarcinoid arthropod Mosineia

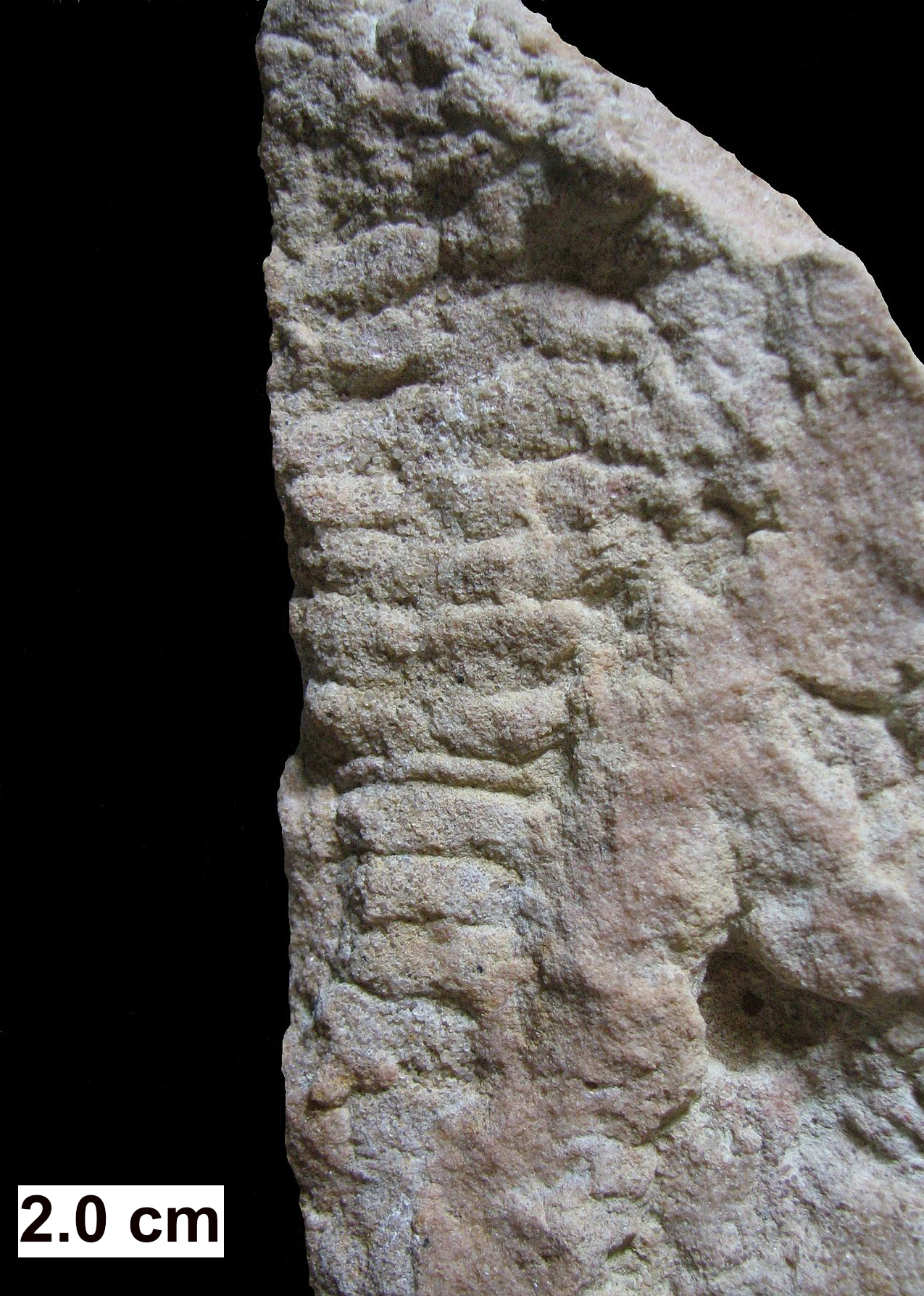
The euthycarcinoid Mosineia macnaughtoni---the presumed maker of some of the Protichnites at Blackberry Hill, and hence one of the first animals to emerge from the sea and walk on land.

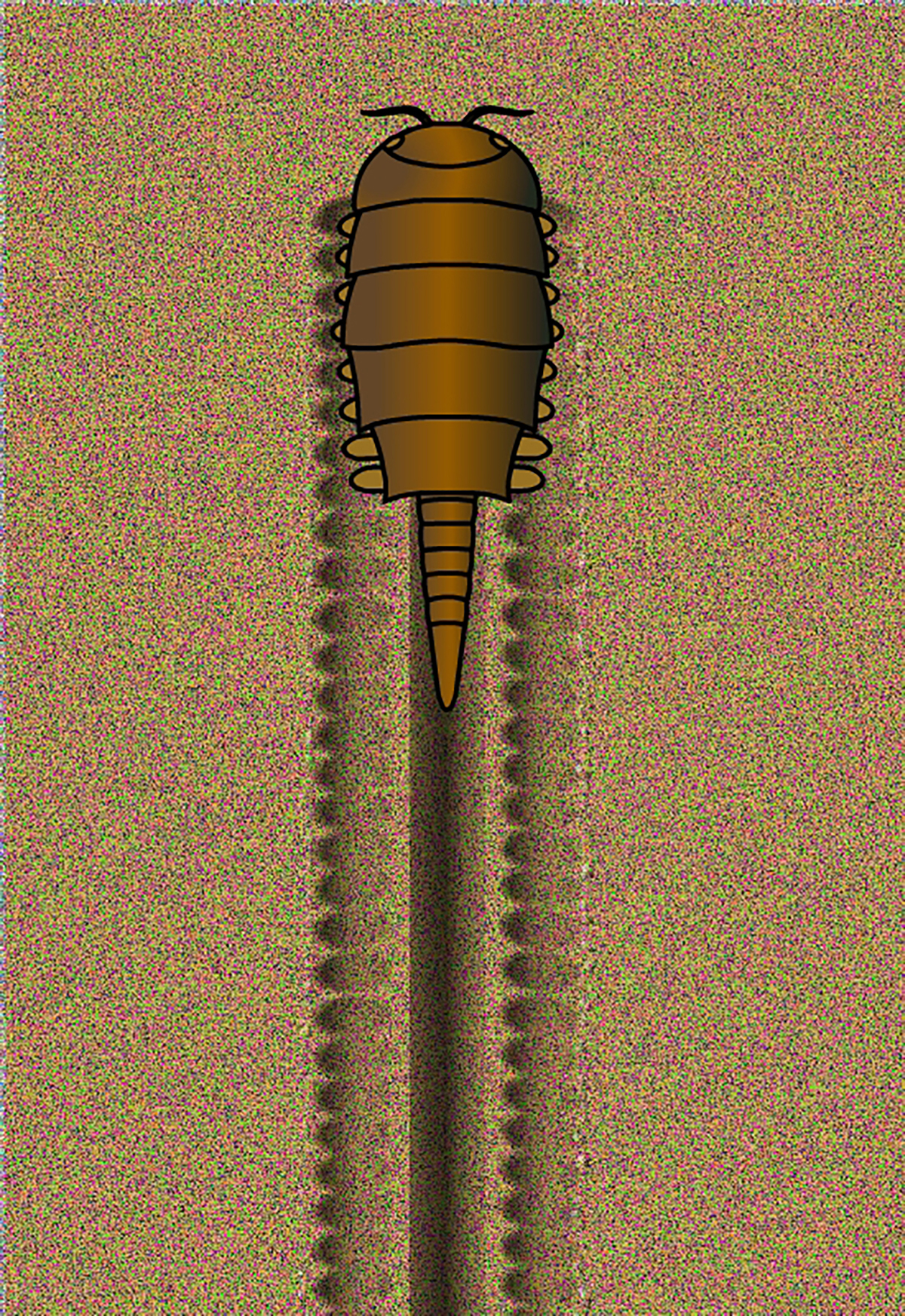
A conceptual drawing of M. macnaughtoni producing the Protichnites tracks.

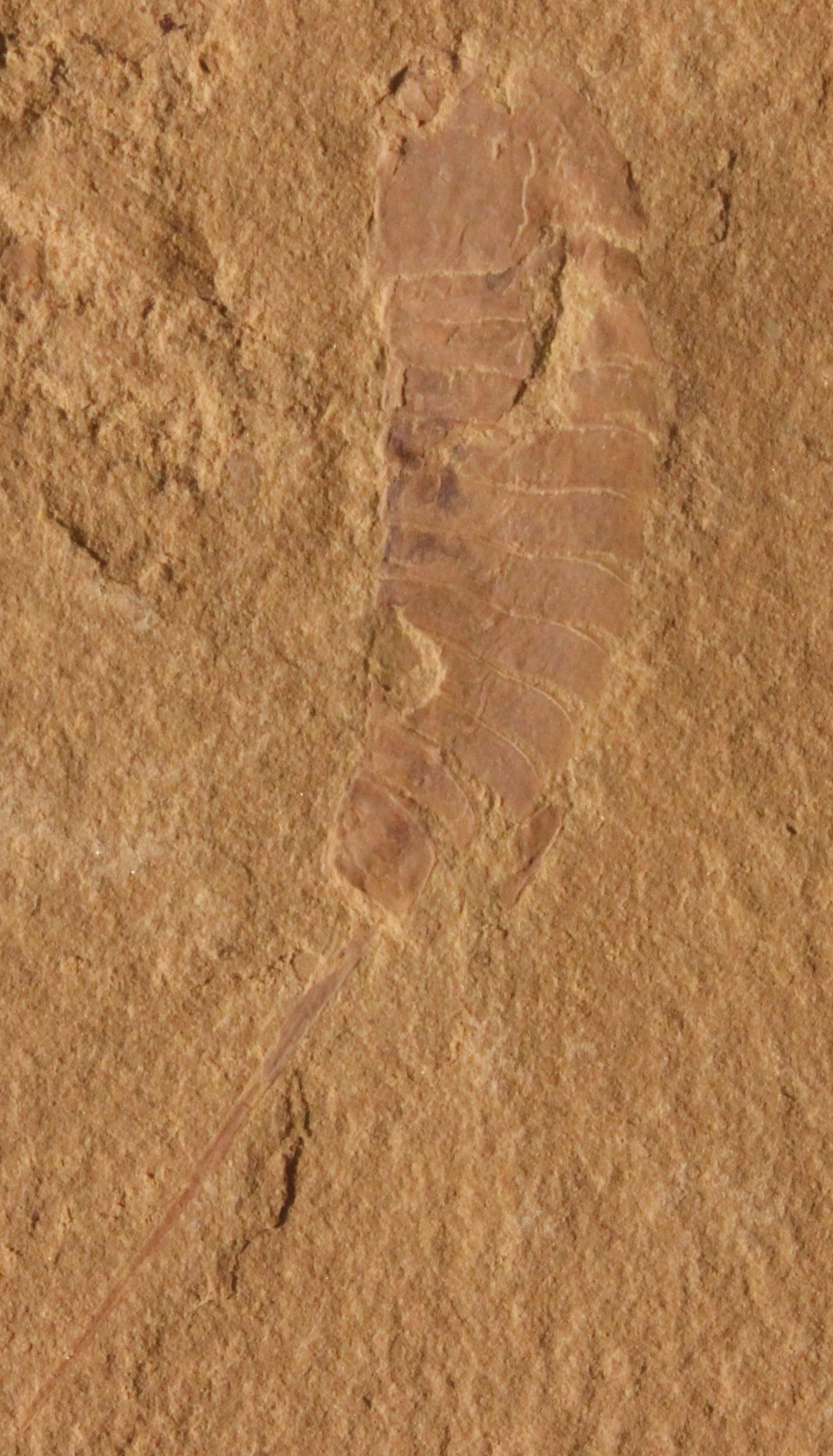
A fossil showing the right side of Cyclopites, an aglaspidid arthropod from the Saint Lawrence Formation in Baraboo.

Aglaspis was another genus of aglaspidid native to Wisconsin.

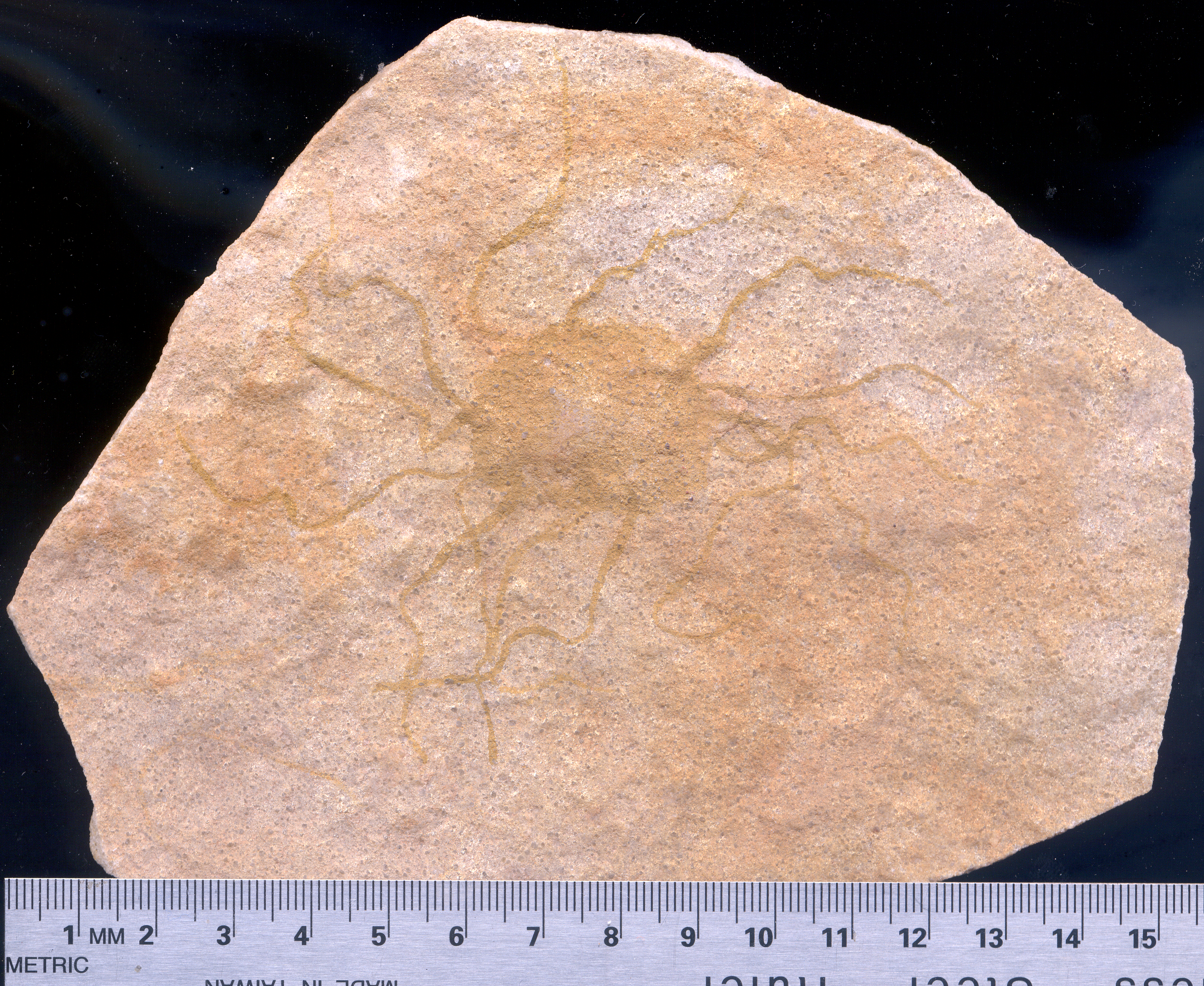
A currently undescribed genus of scyphozoans (jellyfish) from the Mt. Simon Sandstone at Blackberry Hill

A carapace of the phyllocarid crustacean Arenosicaris inflata.

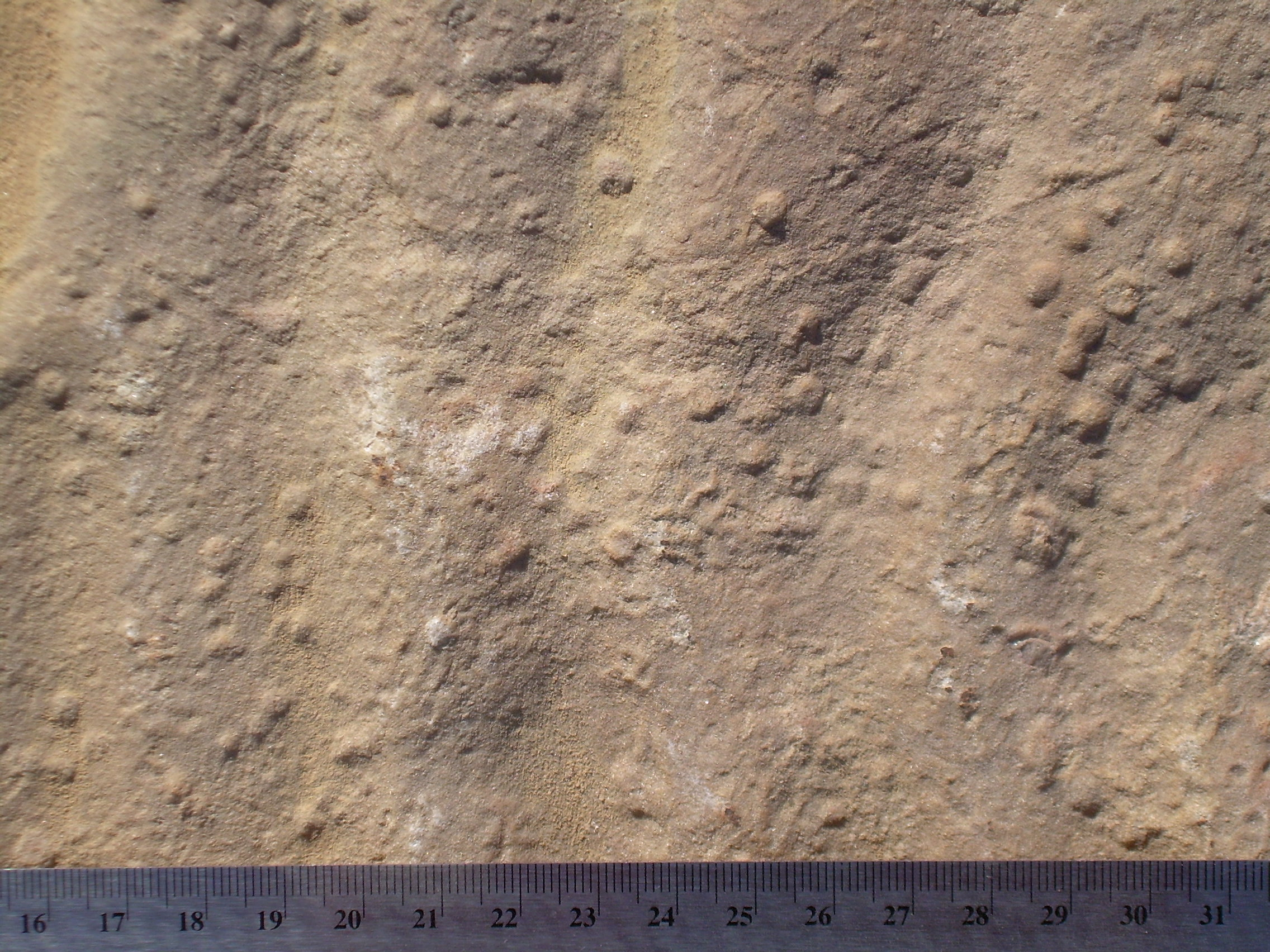
Fossils of sand stromatolites on rippled sandstone

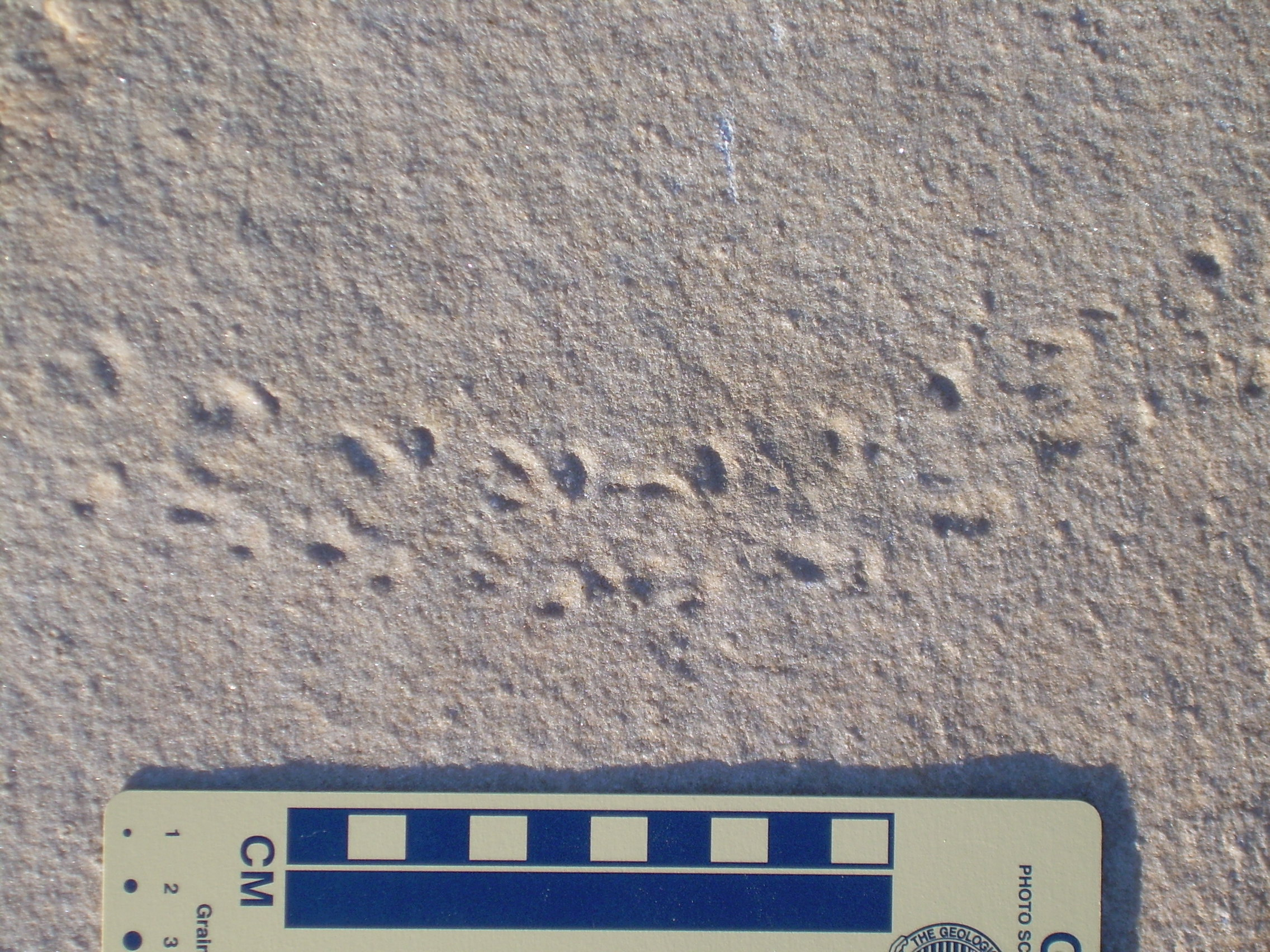
The trackways Diplichnites could be produced by a variety of arthropods throughout the Phanerozoic fossil record, especially millipedes and trilobites in the Paleozoic. This example may have been produced by a euthycarcinoid.

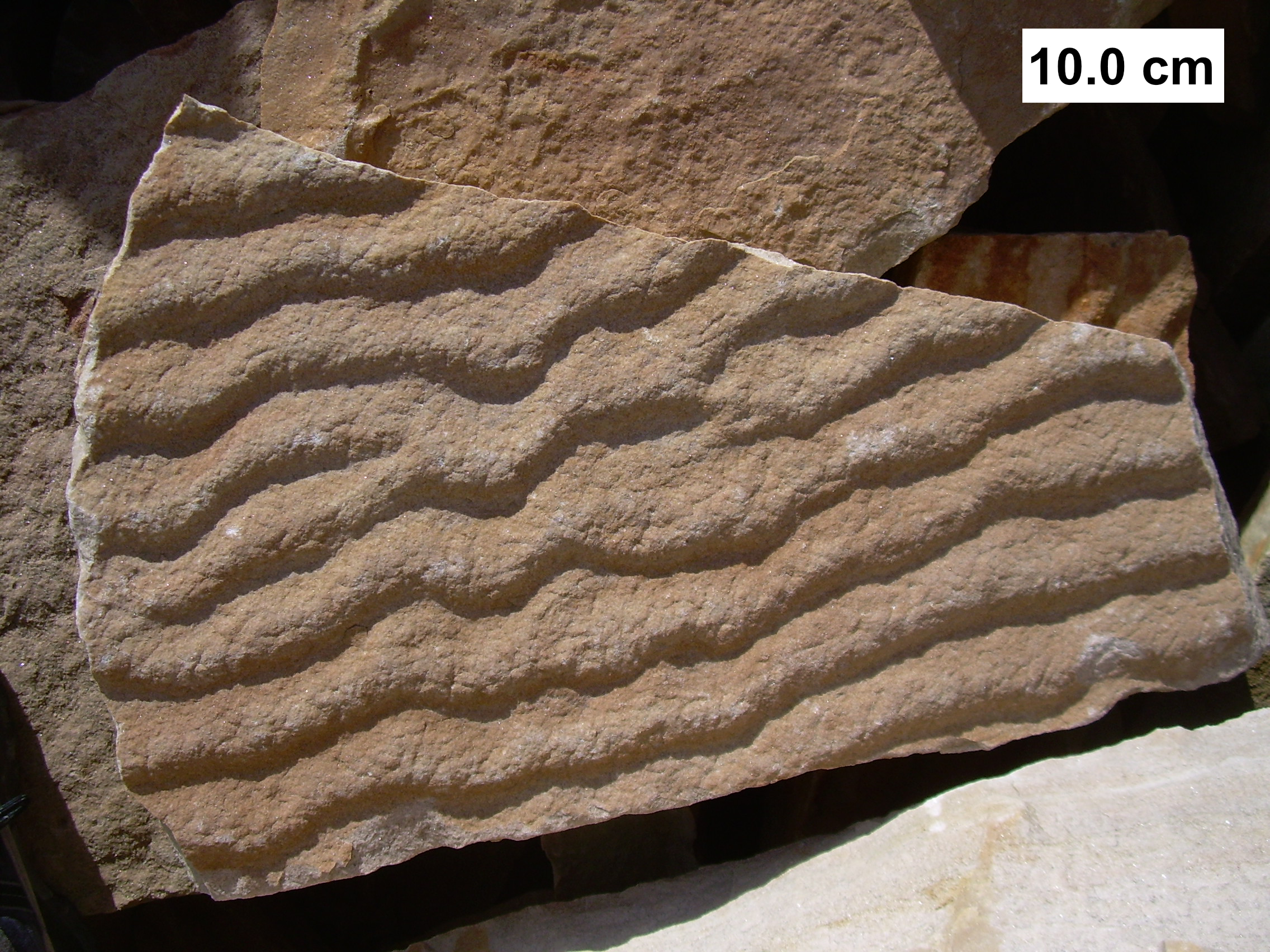
Fossils of wave ripple marks with a microbial mat fossil on its surface.

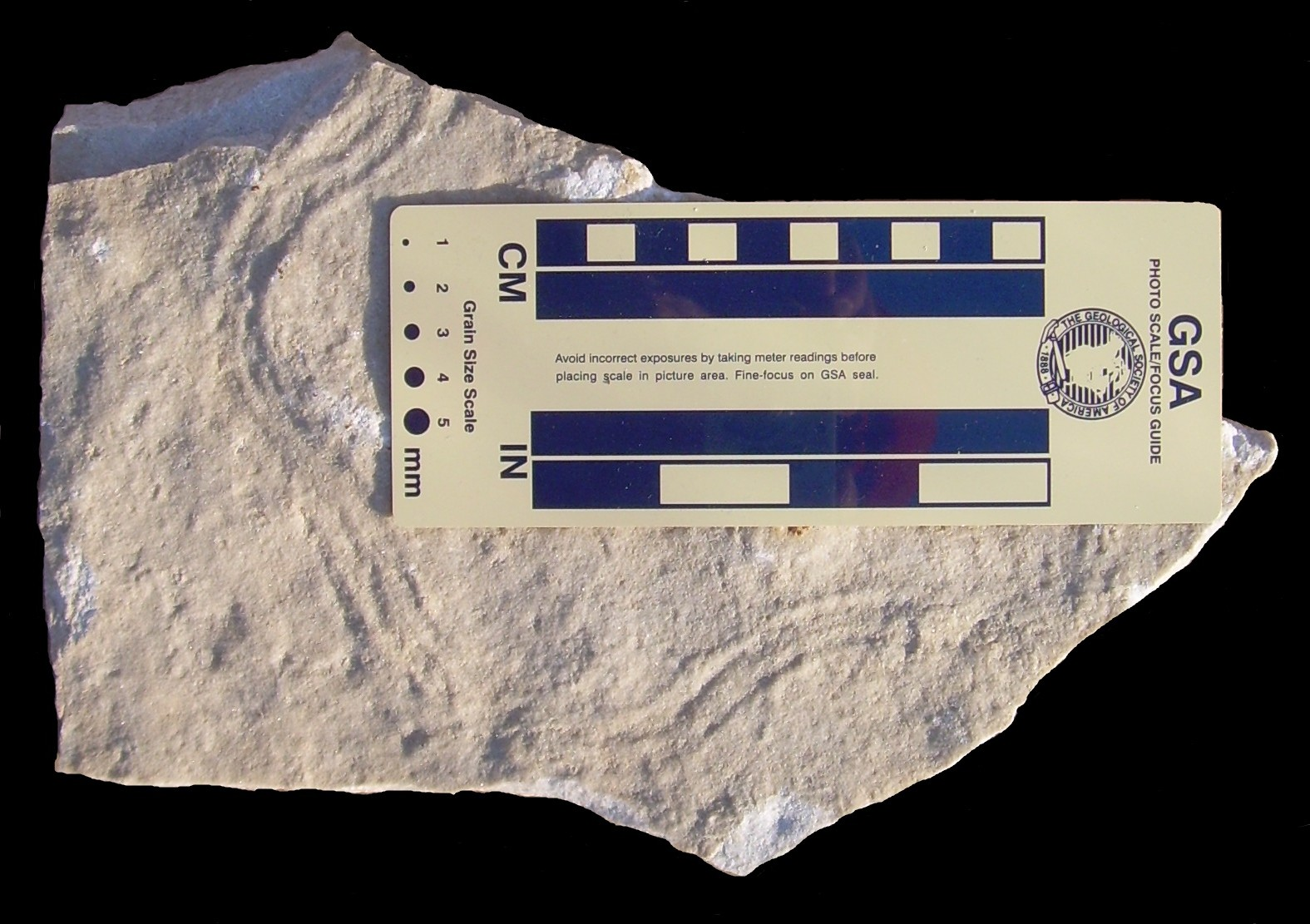
A trace fossil resembling Rusophycus that was probably made by Arenosicaris inflata.

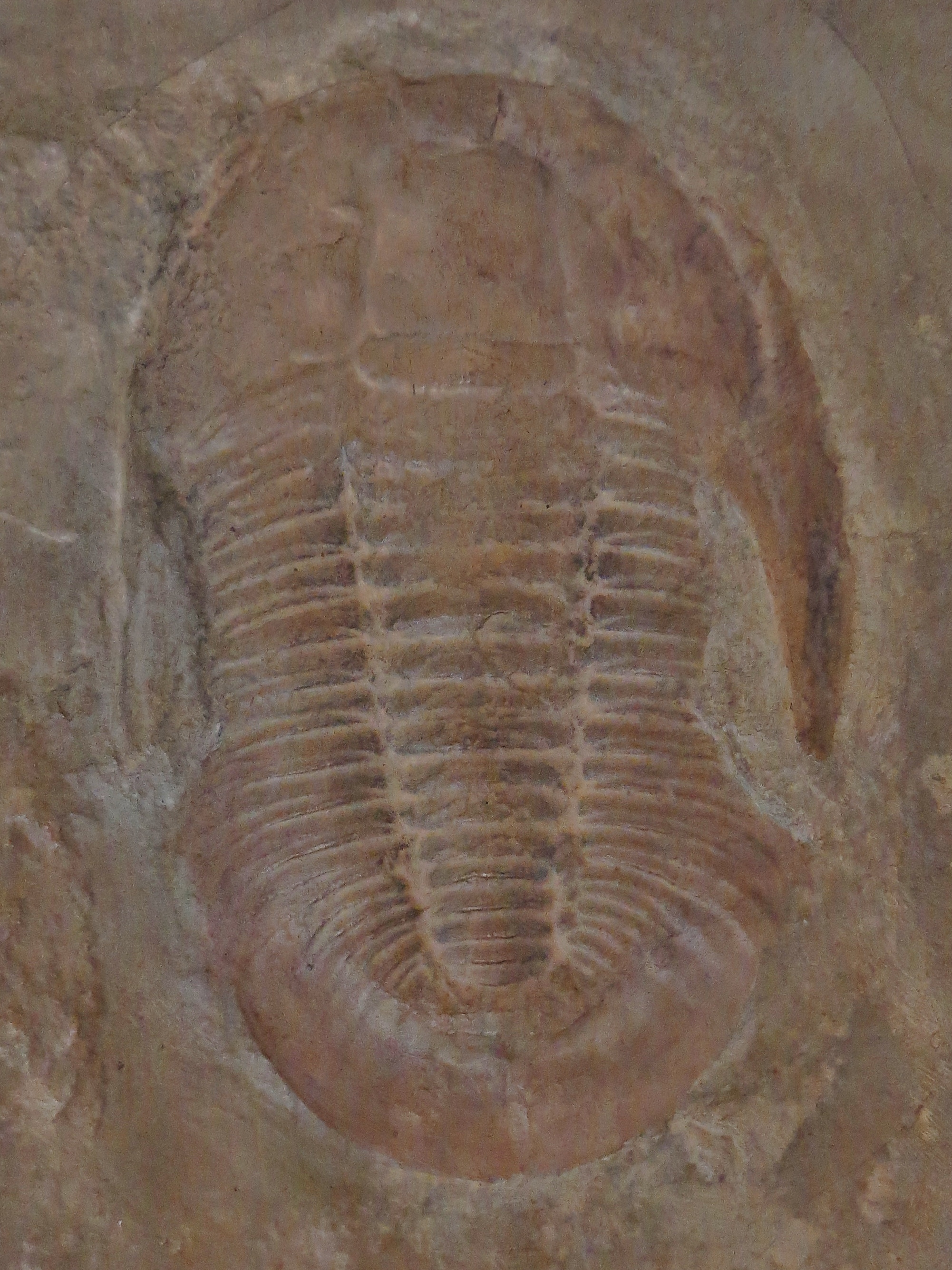
The Cambrian trilobite Saukiella pepinensis.

=== Ordovician ===
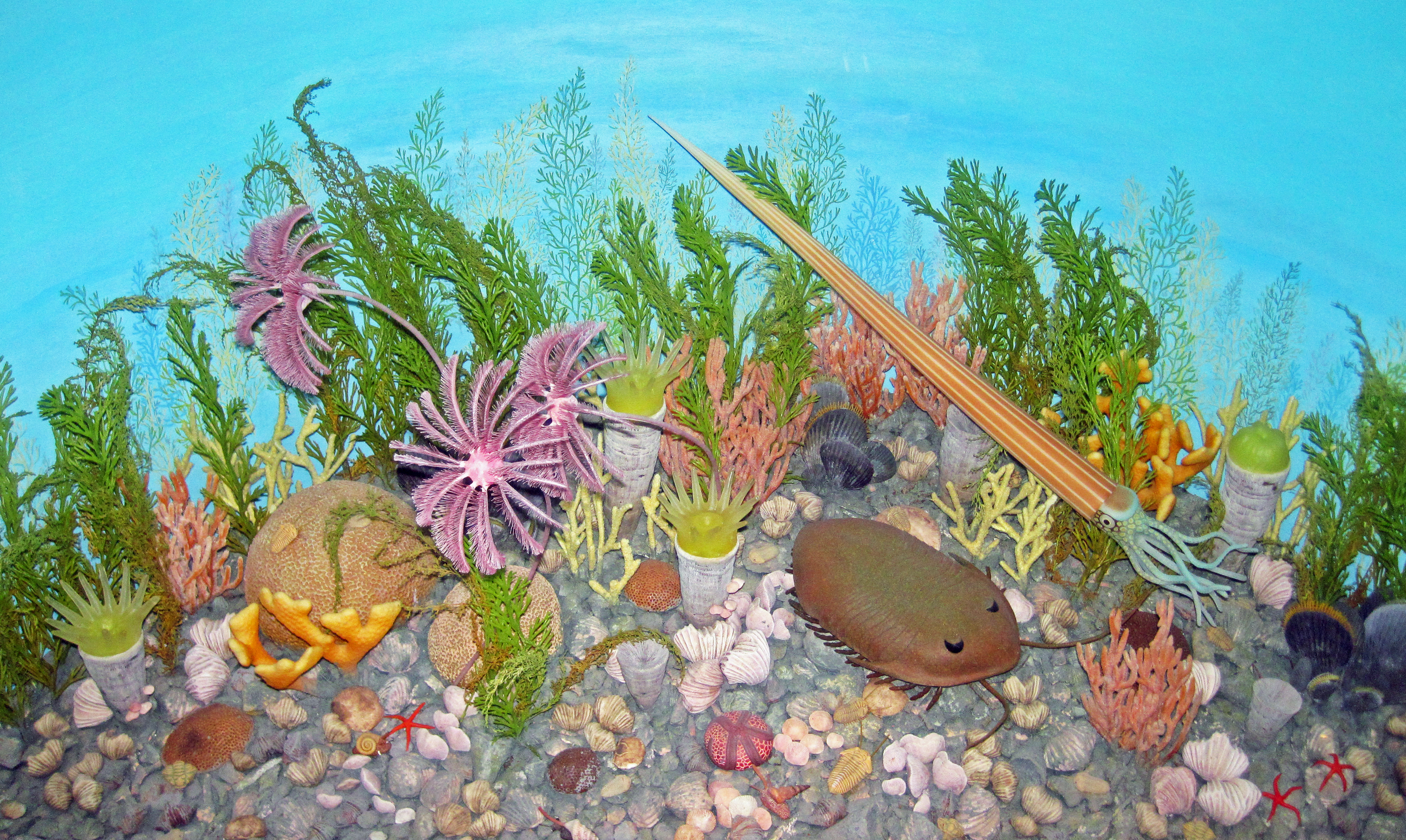
A diorama of a typical Ordovician sea floor

Many fossiliferous Lower to Upper Ordovician rock units are exposed in the southwestern portion of Wisconsin. During this time, most of Wisconsin was covered in a shallow tropical ocean that teemed with an abundance of life. These include many species of stromatolites, fungi, sponges, conulariids, rugose corals, tabulate corals, bryozoans, brachiopods, gastropods, monoplacophorans, bivalves, nautiloids, trilobites, ostracods, crinoids, graptolites, and conodont elements.

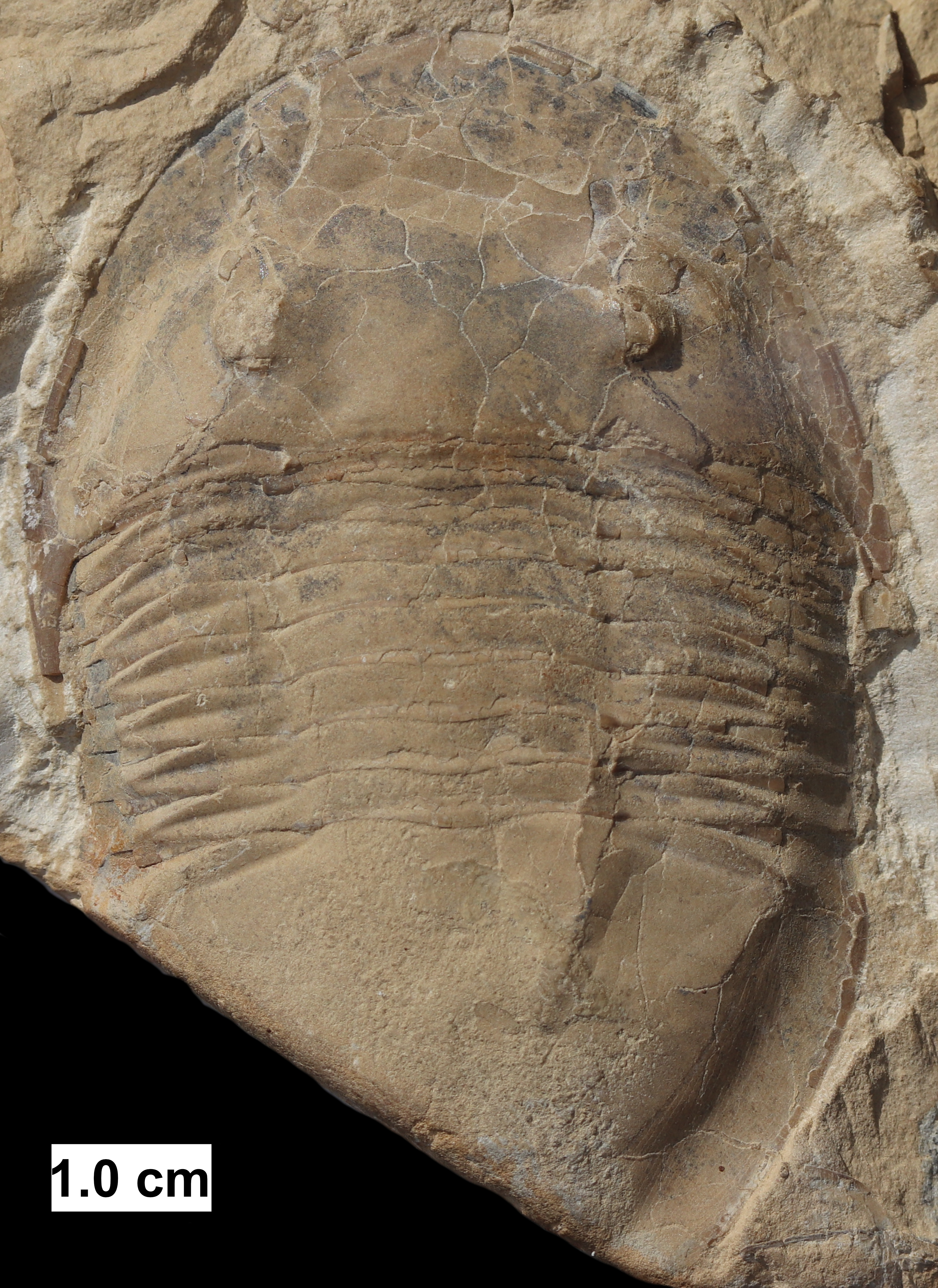
The Ordovician trilobite Isotelus, found in Wisconsin.

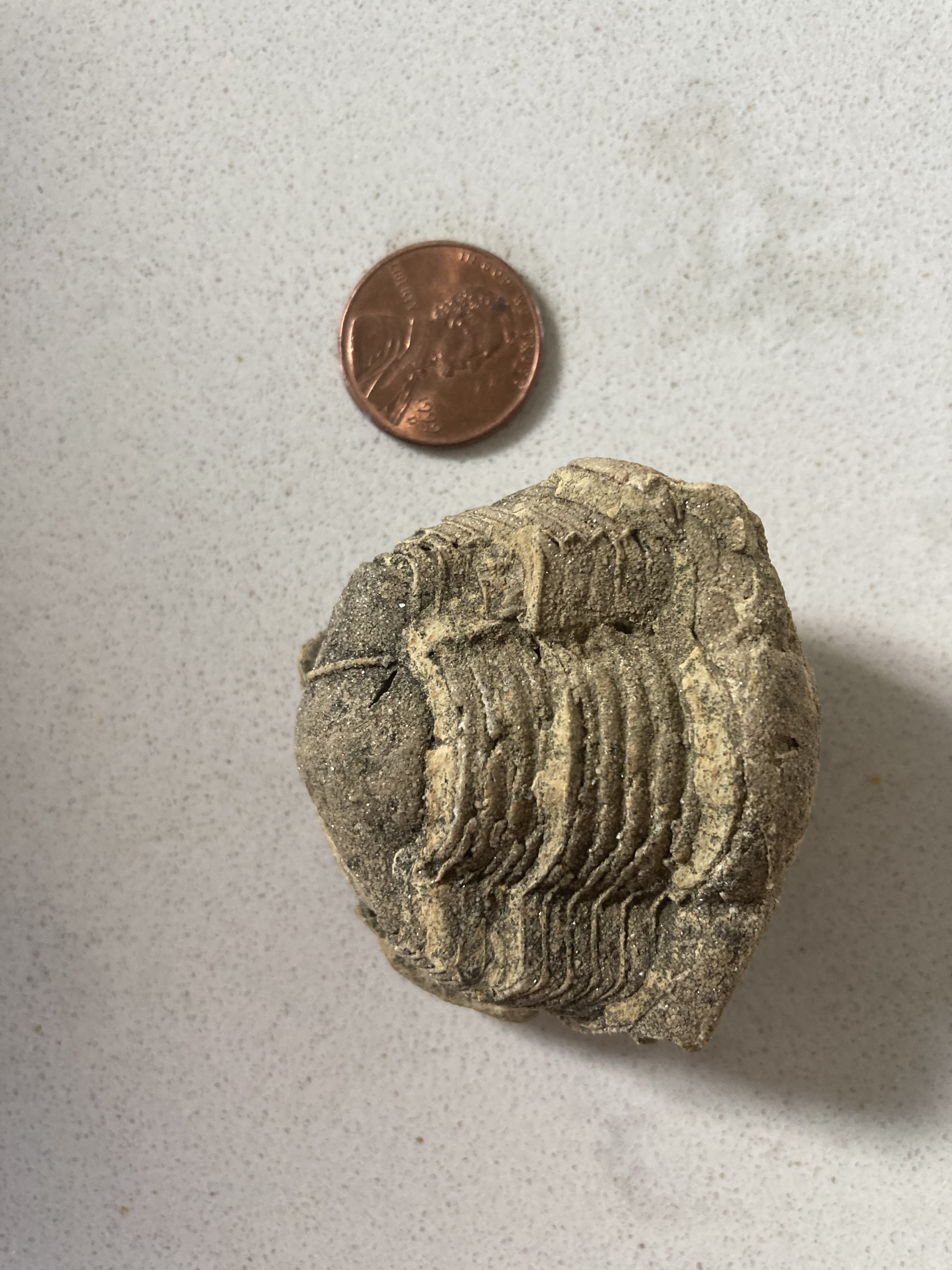
The Illaenidae trilobite Thaleops found in the Sinnipee Group in Dane County

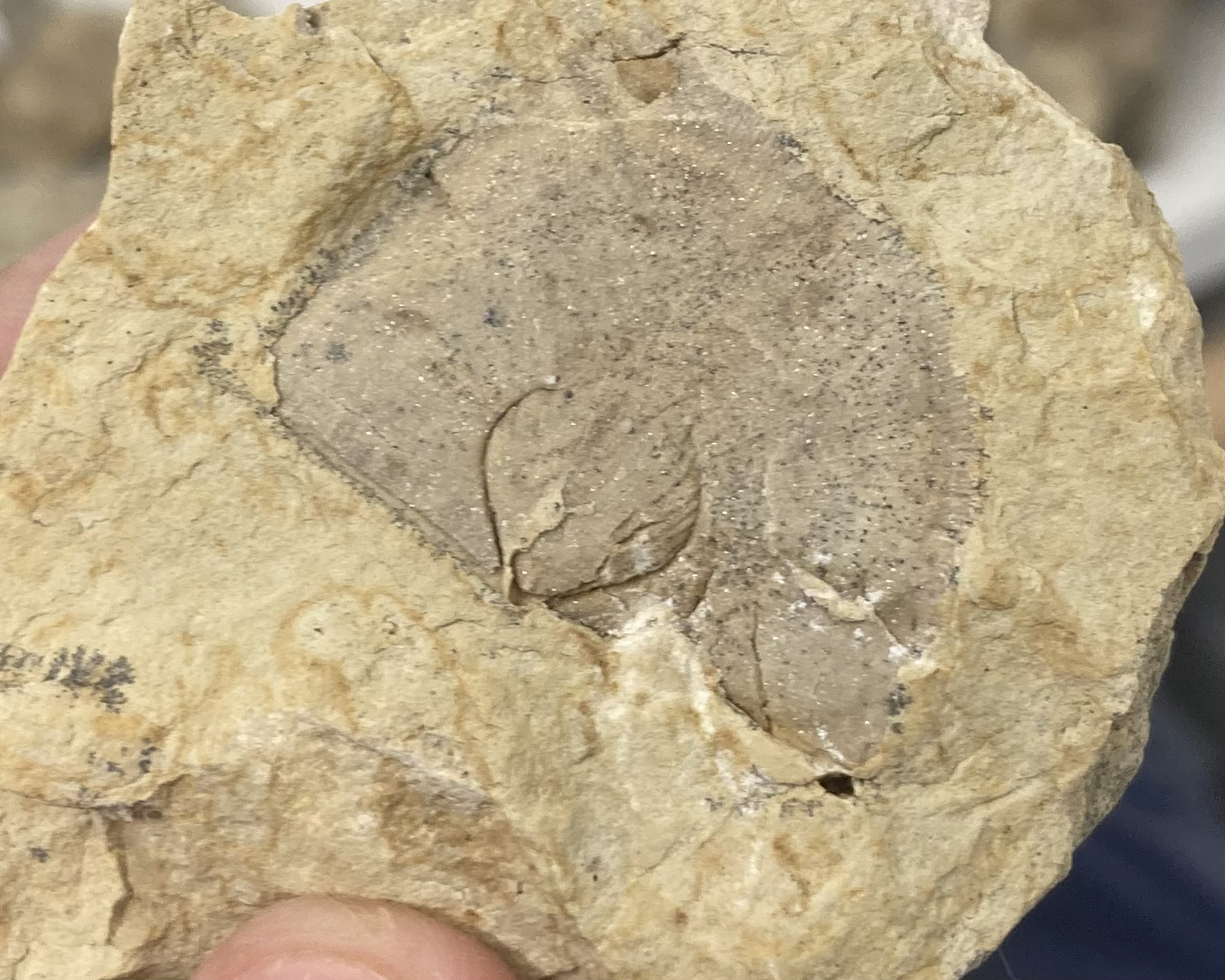
The strophomenid brachiopod Strophomena from the Sinnipee Group in Dane County

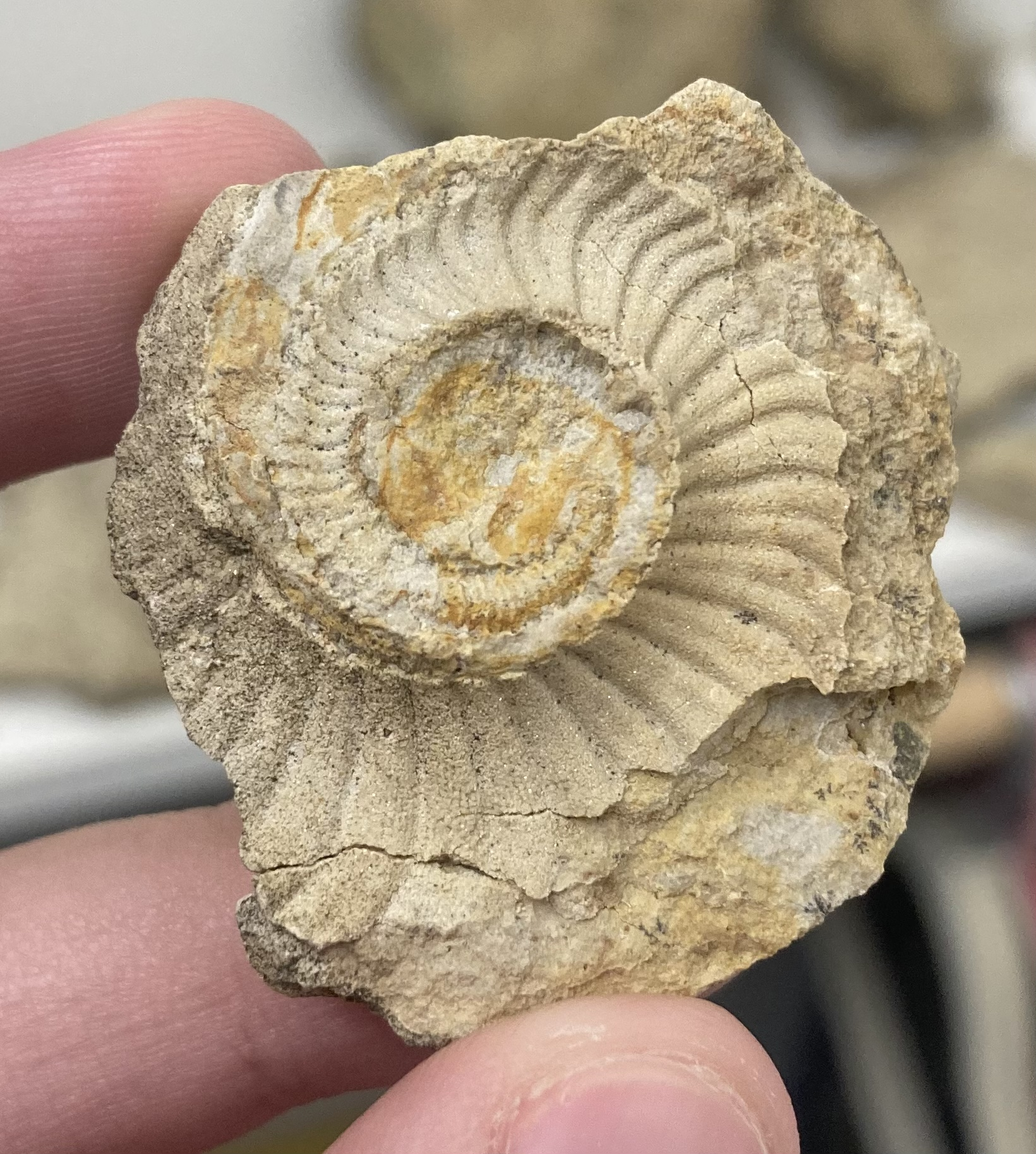
The imprint of the nautiloid Trocholites from the Sinnipee Group in Dane County

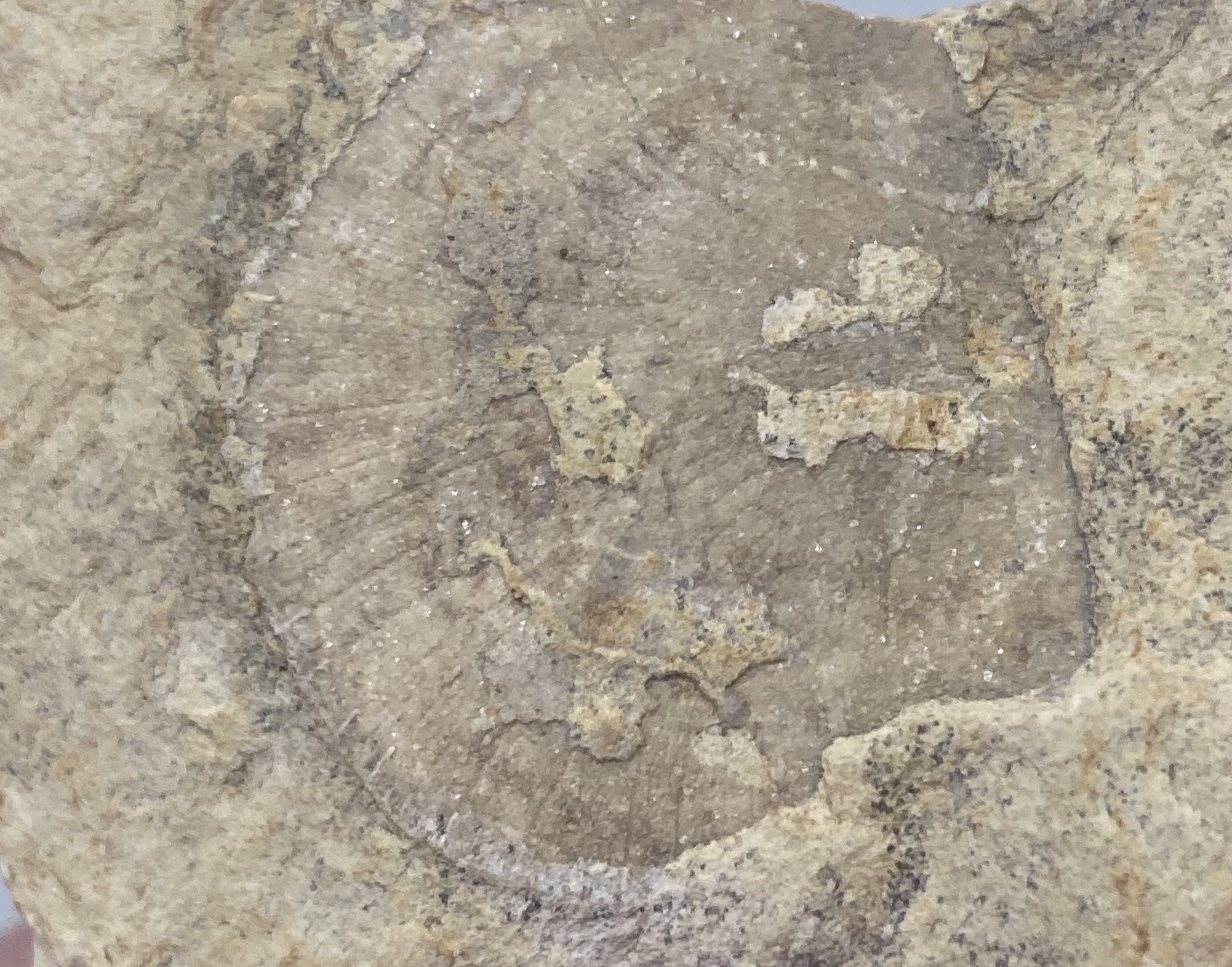
An unidentified orthid brachiopod from the Sinnipee Group in Dane County

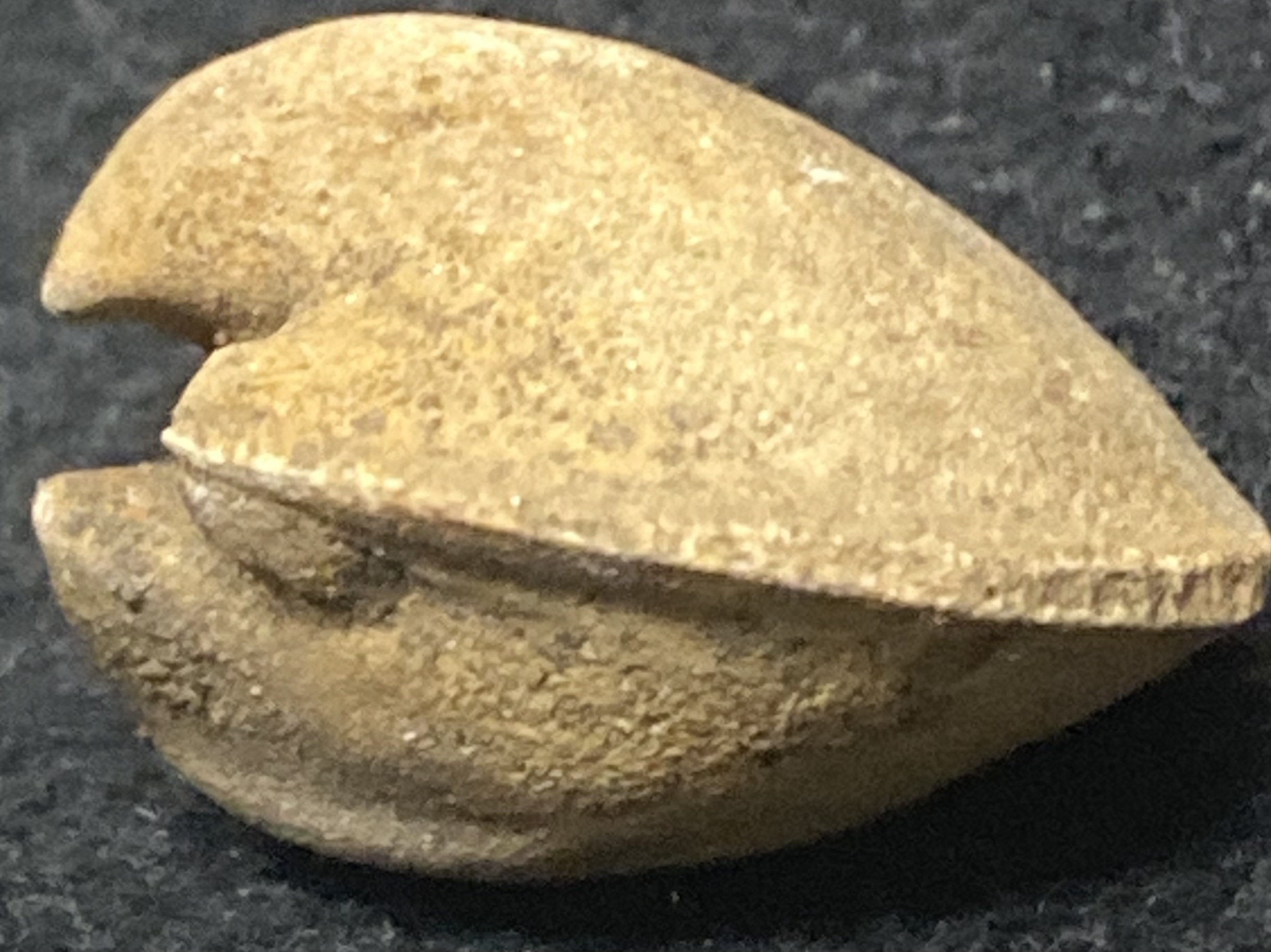
A bivalve mollusk called Saffordia from the Sinnipee Group in Dane County

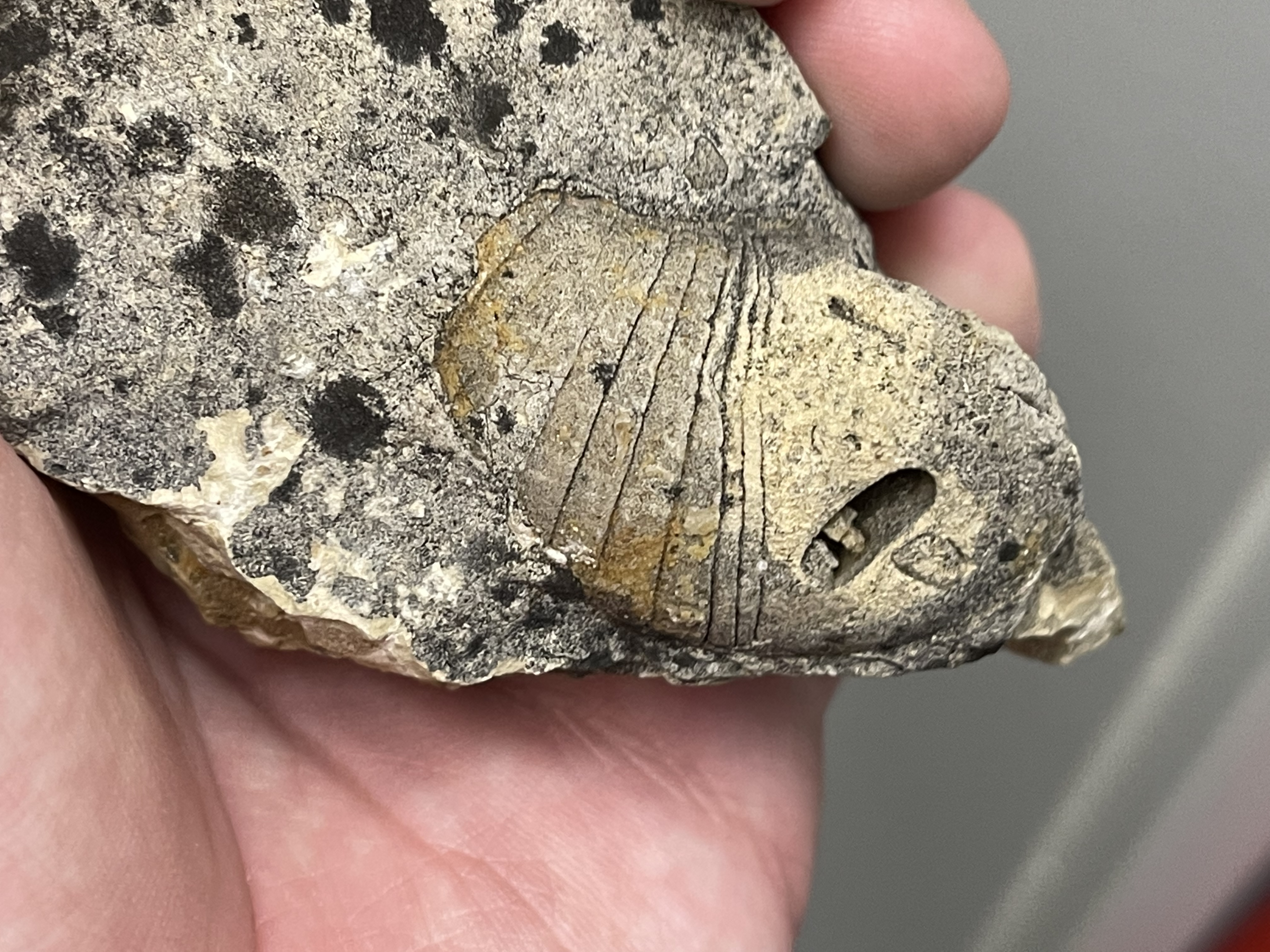
A large nautiloid cephalopod called Beloitoceras belonging to the group Oncocerida from the Sinnipee Group in Dane County

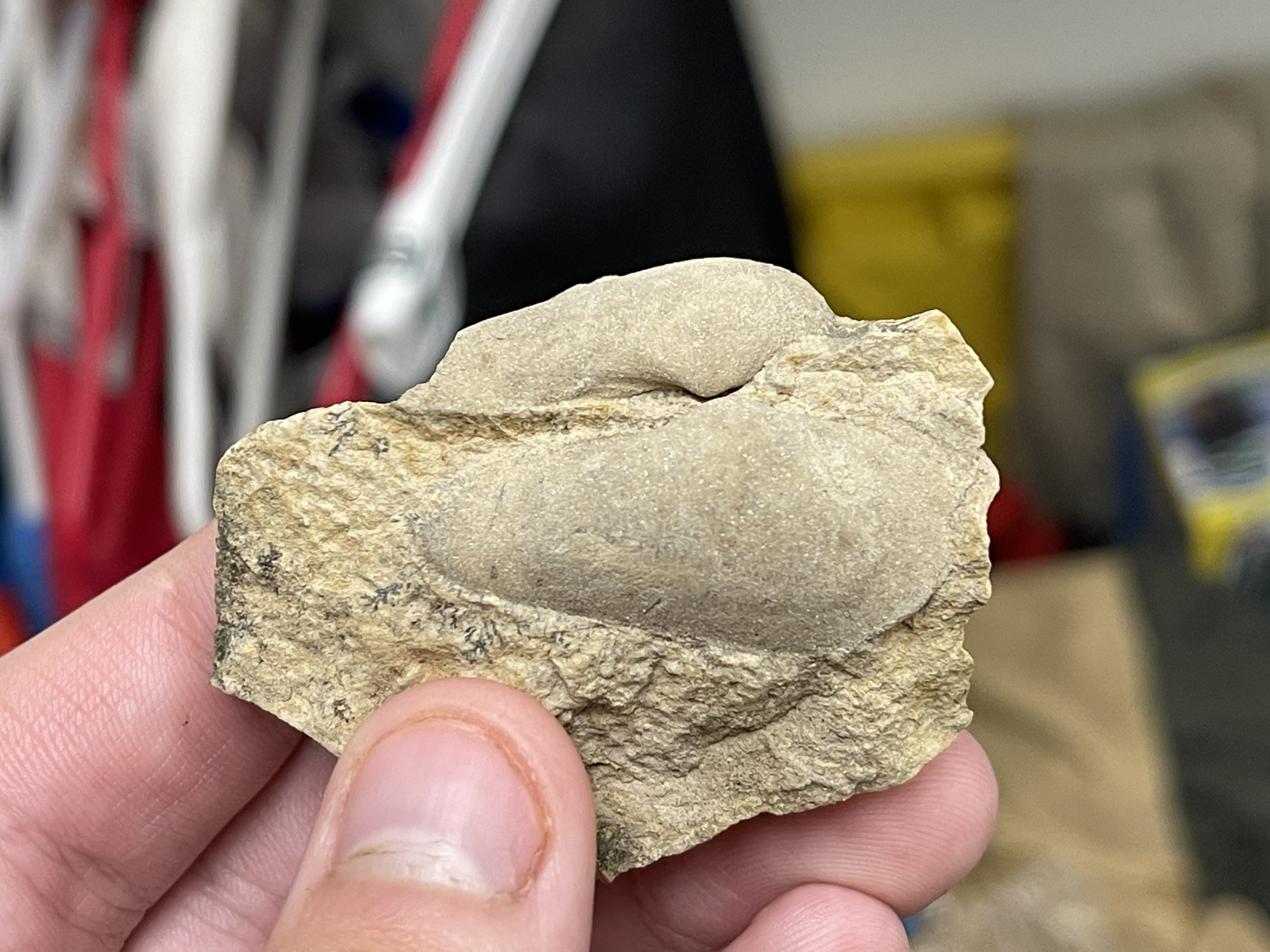
A mid sized bivalve mollusk called Similodonta from Dane County

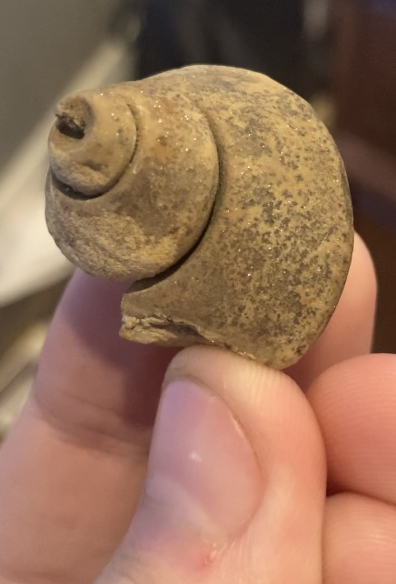
A fossil gastropod called Clathrospira from the Sinnipee Group in Dane County

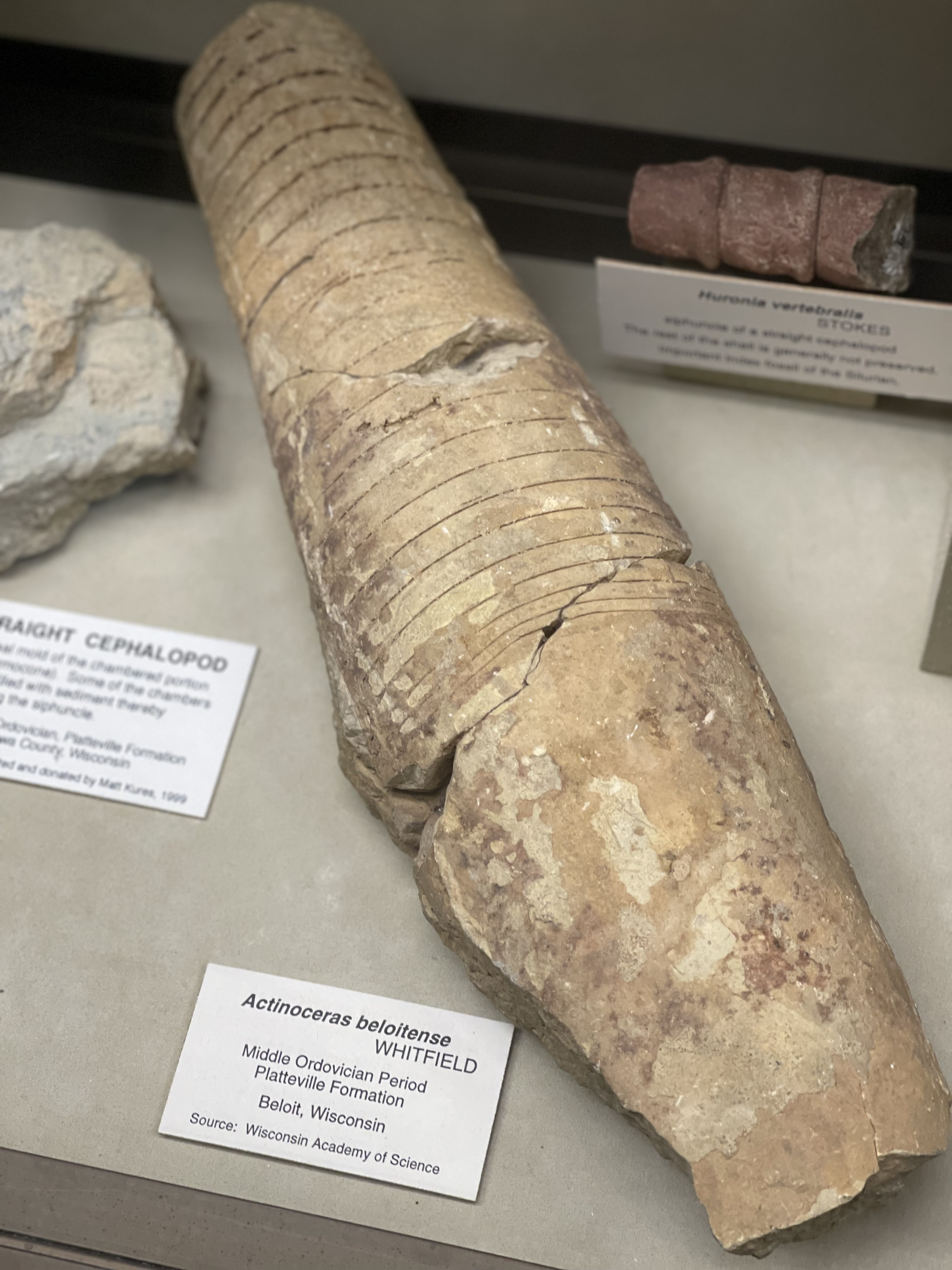
The holotype of Actinoceras beloitense from the Platteville Limestone

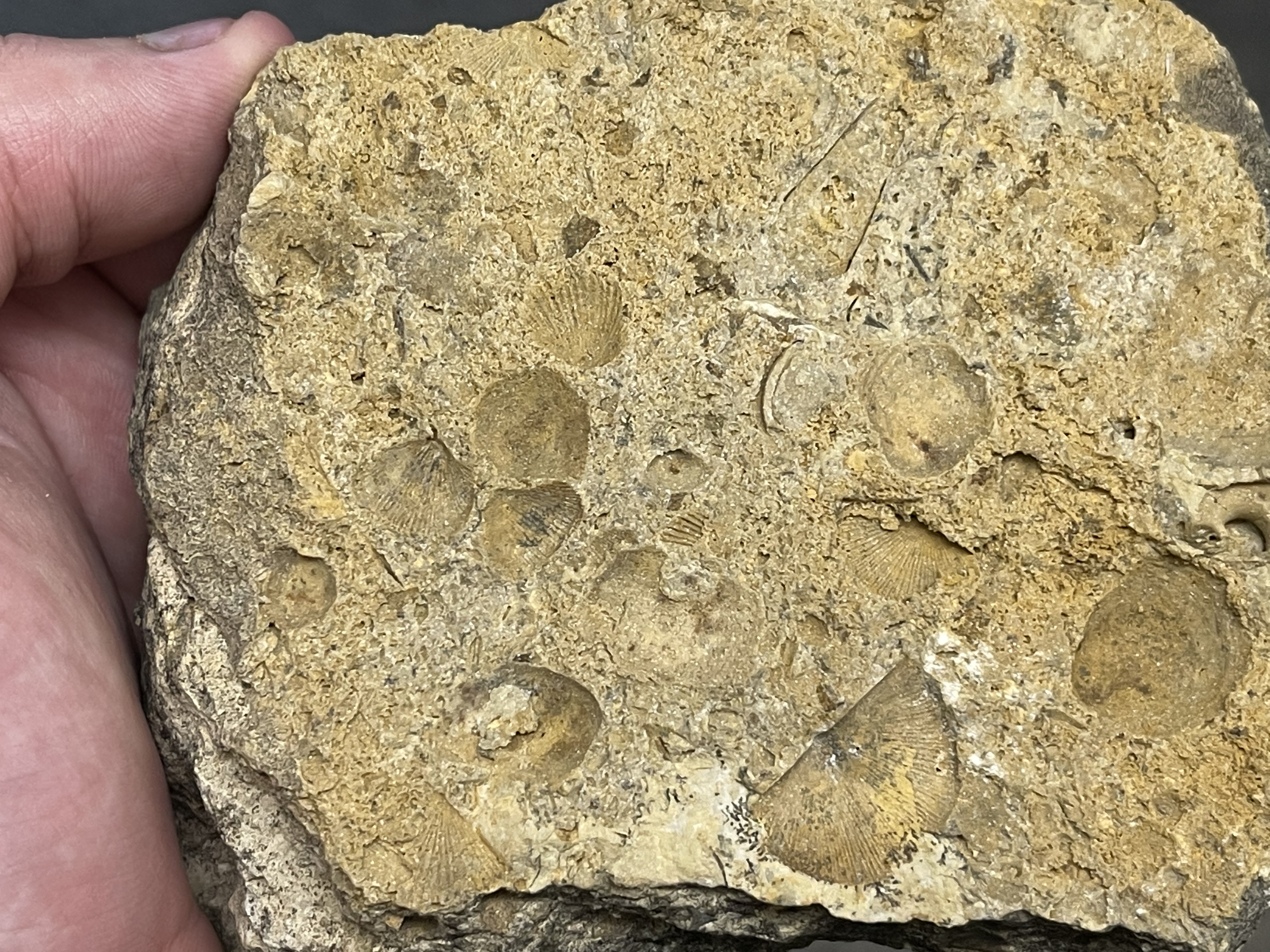
A mass death plate of rhynchonellid and strophomenid brachiopods as well as modiomorphid bivalves from Dane County

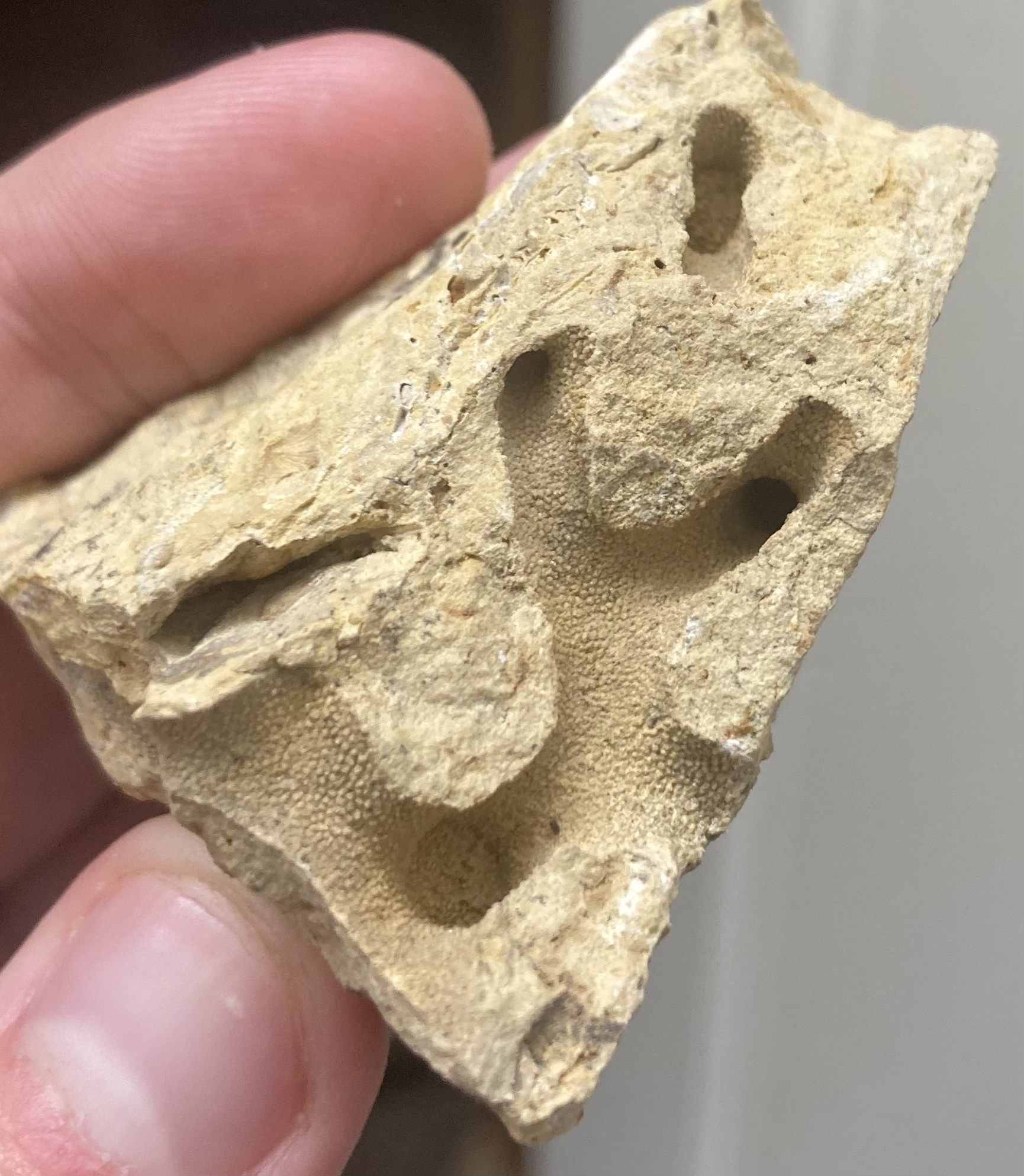
The imprint of a bryozoan, a colonial invertebrate that is still alive today from the Sinnipee groop

=== Silurian ===
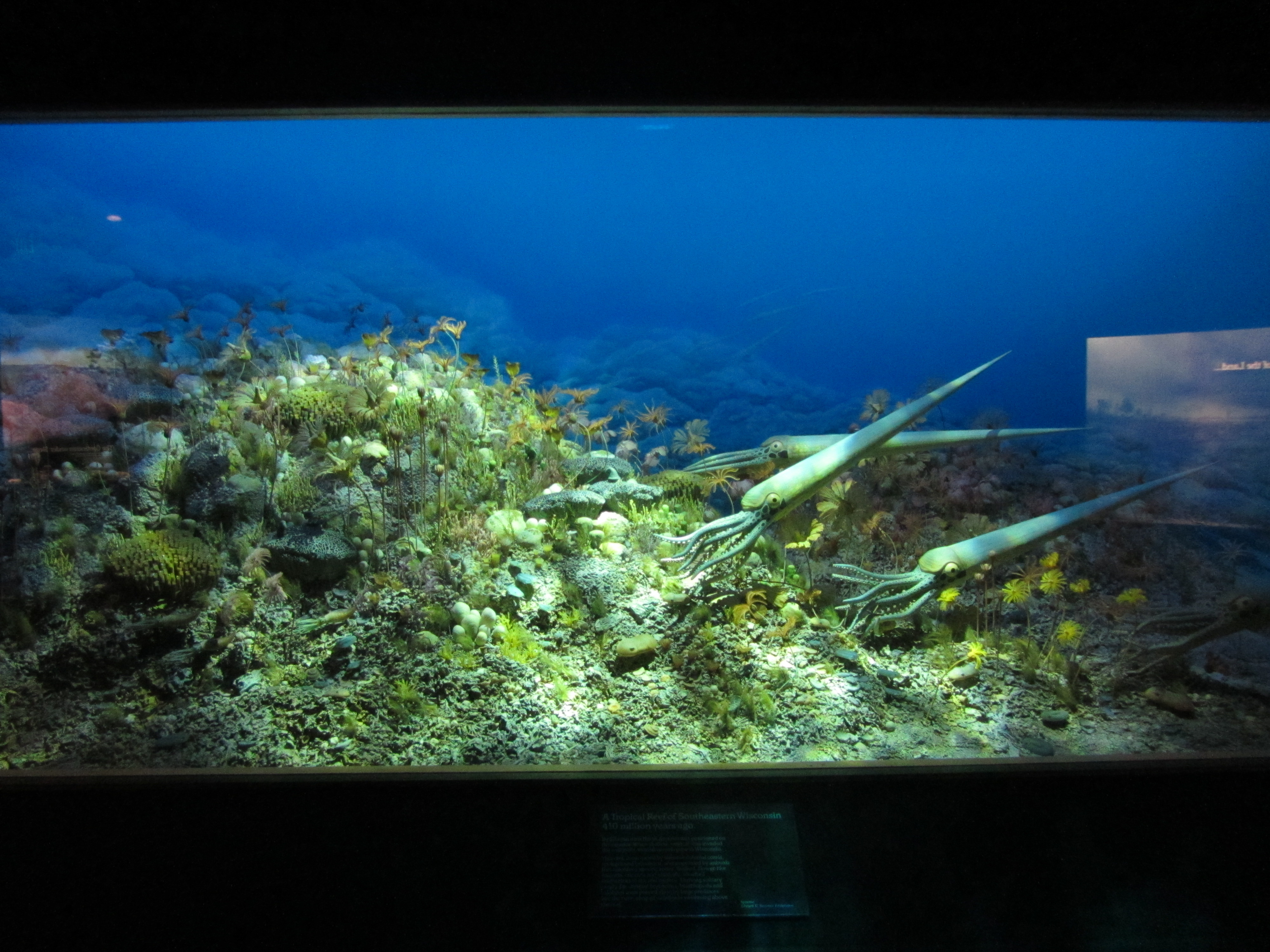
A diorama depicting the large Silurian reefs that ran through ancient Wisconsin and Illinois

Fossiliferous Silurian rocks are exposed in eastern Wisconsin, from the Door County peninsula to the Illinois border. Fossils include stromatolites, stromatoporoids, sponges, conulariids, rugose and tabulate corals, bryozoans, brachiopods, gastropods, monoplacophorans, bivalves, nautiloids, trilobites, ostracods, phyllocarids, cystoids, crinoids, graptolites, conodont elements, and jawless fish bones. During the Middle-Late Silurian, the area around modern Milwaukee contained a massive reef system. The fauna that lived there at that time is among the most diverse for its age on the entire continent. Donald G. Mikulic has called it "a textbook example of ancient reefs." Also of much significance is the Waukesha Biota, which is a Konservat-Lagerstätte famous for its superbly preserved fossils of strange arthropods, worms, and other organisms not previously recorded from Silurian rocks. Among the Waukesha Biota's fossil organisms seldom preserved in other Silurian occurrences are a synziphosurine, a possible cheloniellid, a thylacocephalan, a bizarre arthropod called Parioscorpio, an enigmatic bivalved arthropod, conodonts, lobopods, palaeoscolecids, a cycloneuralian and other 'worms,' graptolites, and chordates.

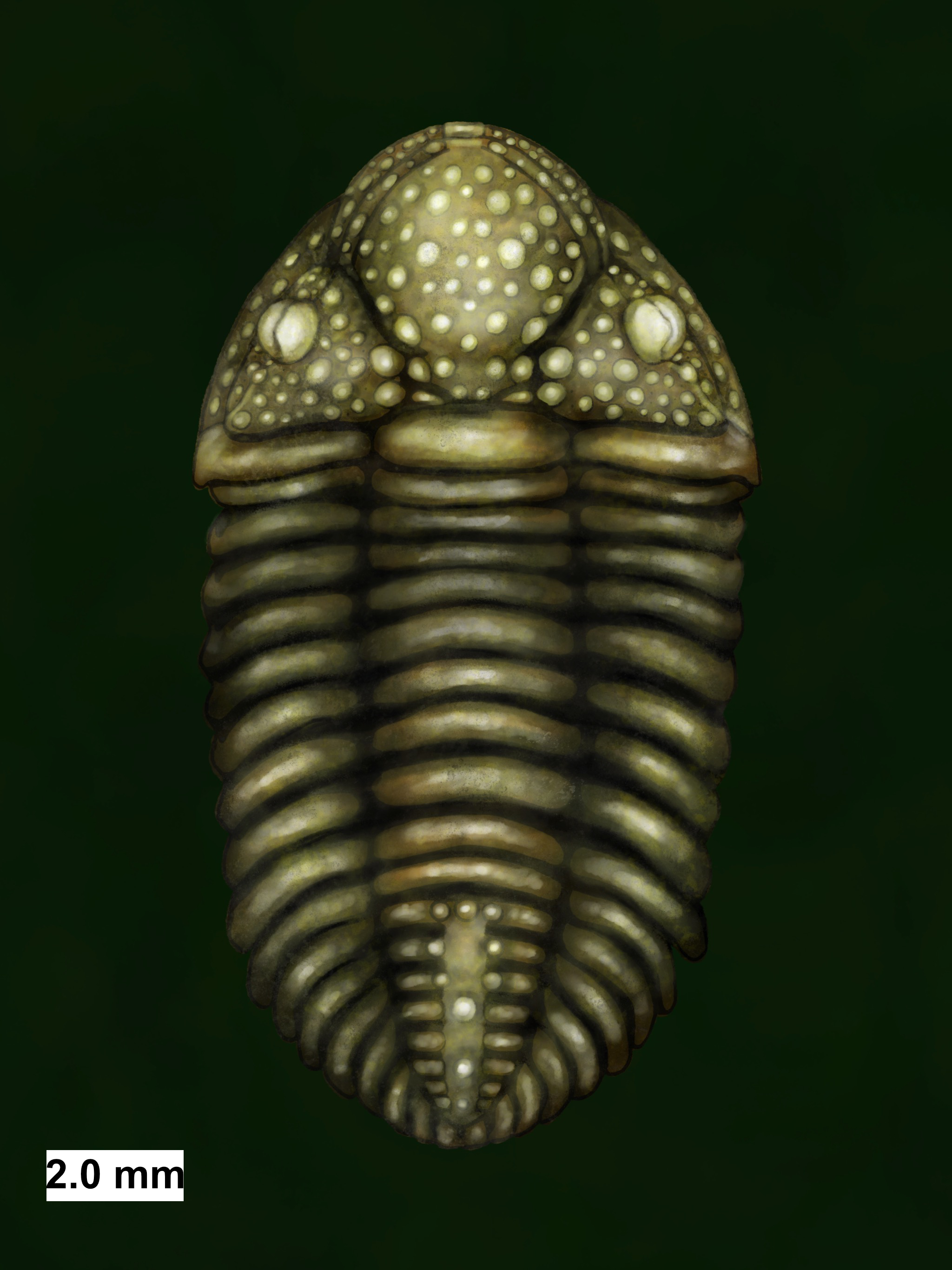
Drawing of the Silurian encrinurid trilobite Mackenziurus lauriae Gass, Edgecombe, Ramskold, Mikulic, and Watkins, 1992.

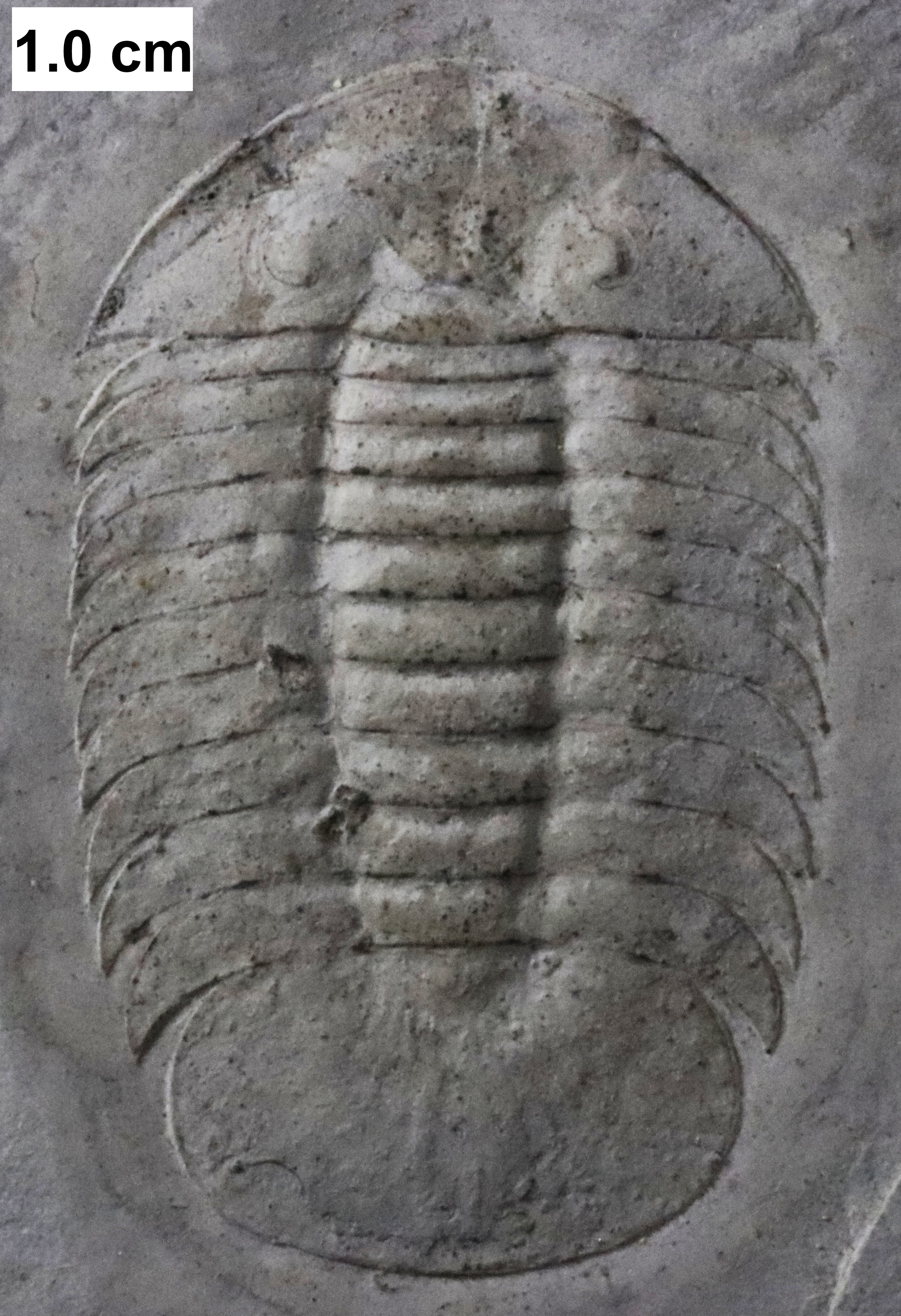
The Silurian styginid trilobite Meroperyx from the Waukesha Biota.

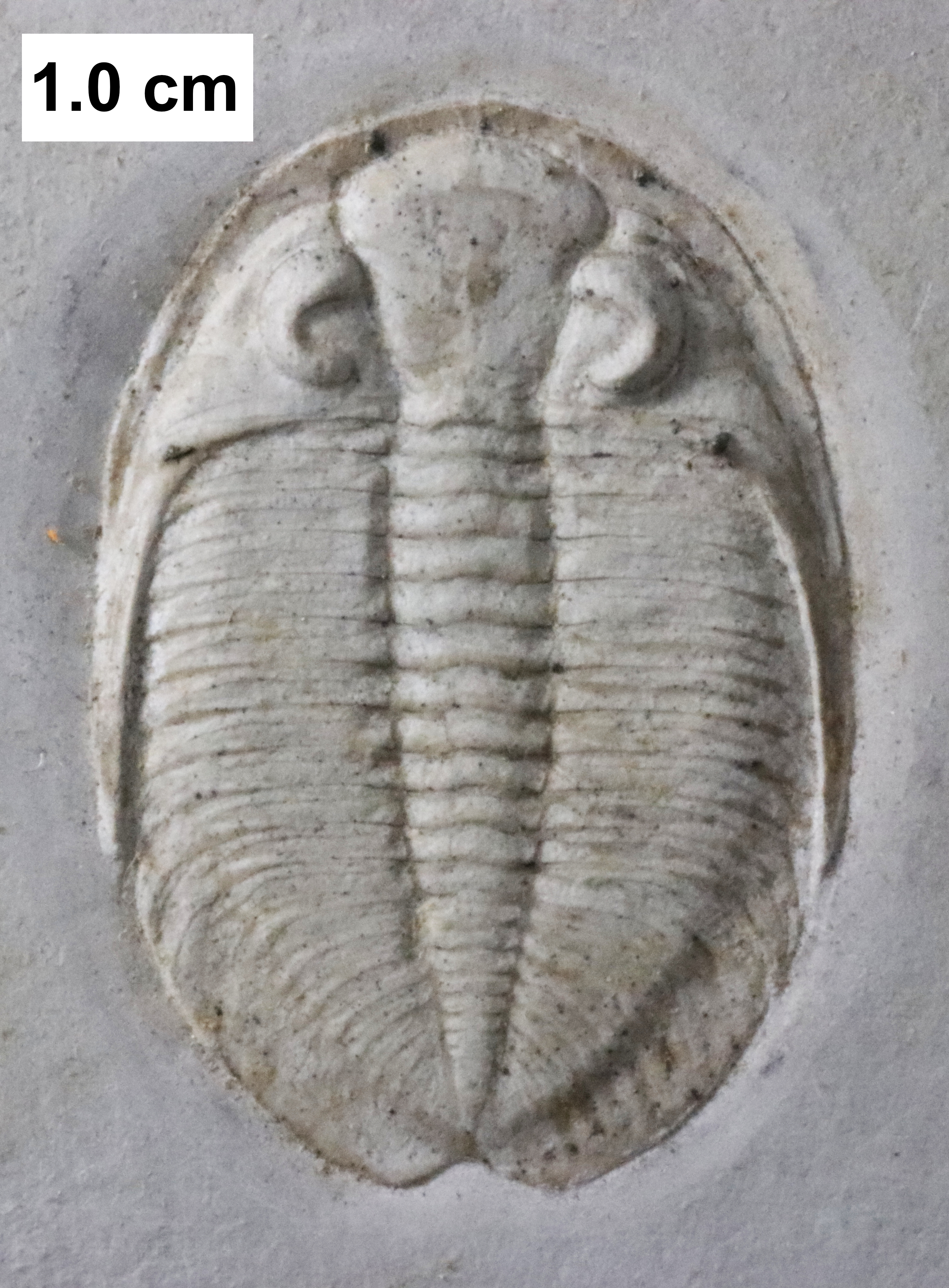
Waukeshaaspis, a dalmanitid trilobite which is one of the more common arthropods from the Waukesha Biota.

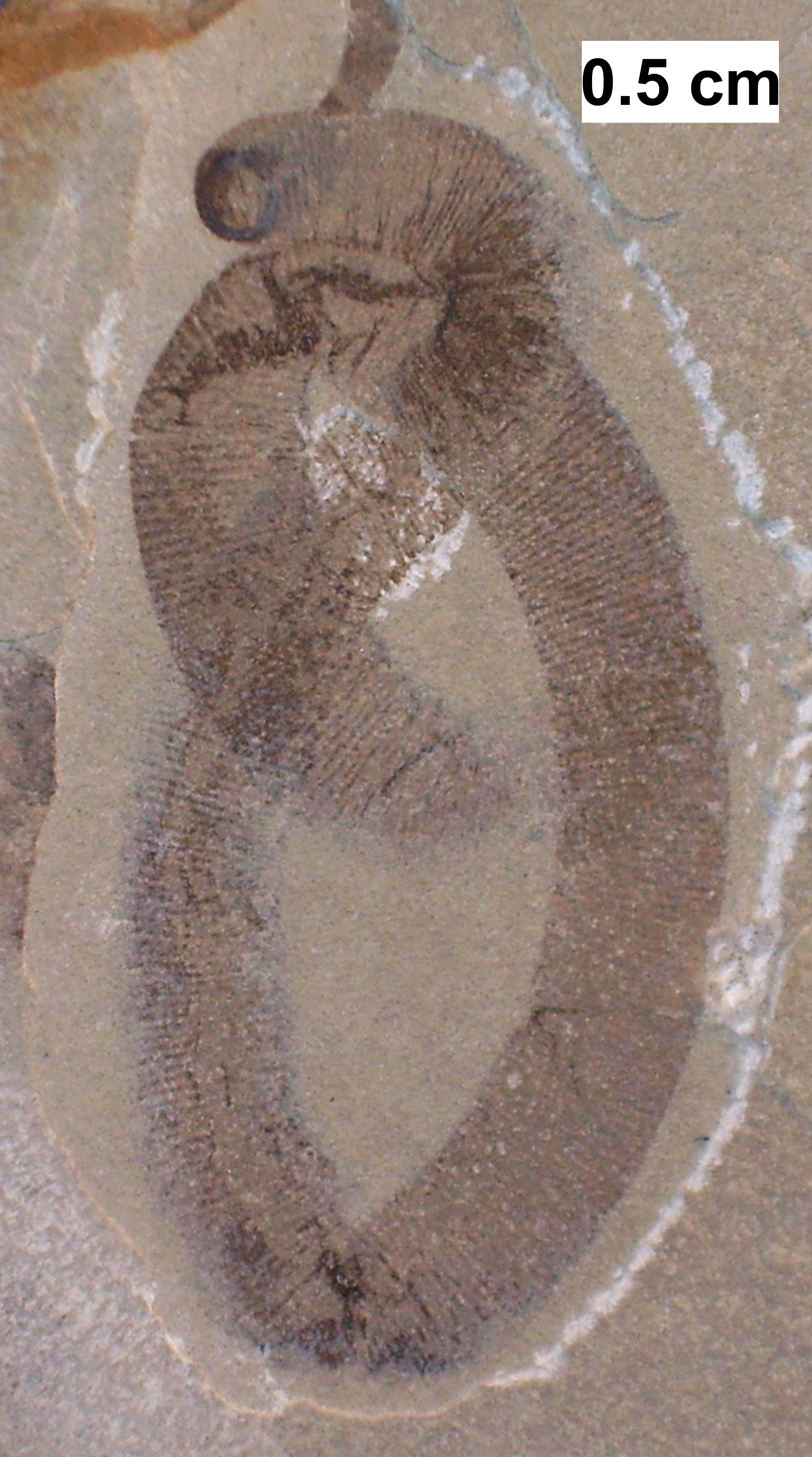
Silurian worm, possibly a cycloneuralian, from the Waukesha Biota.

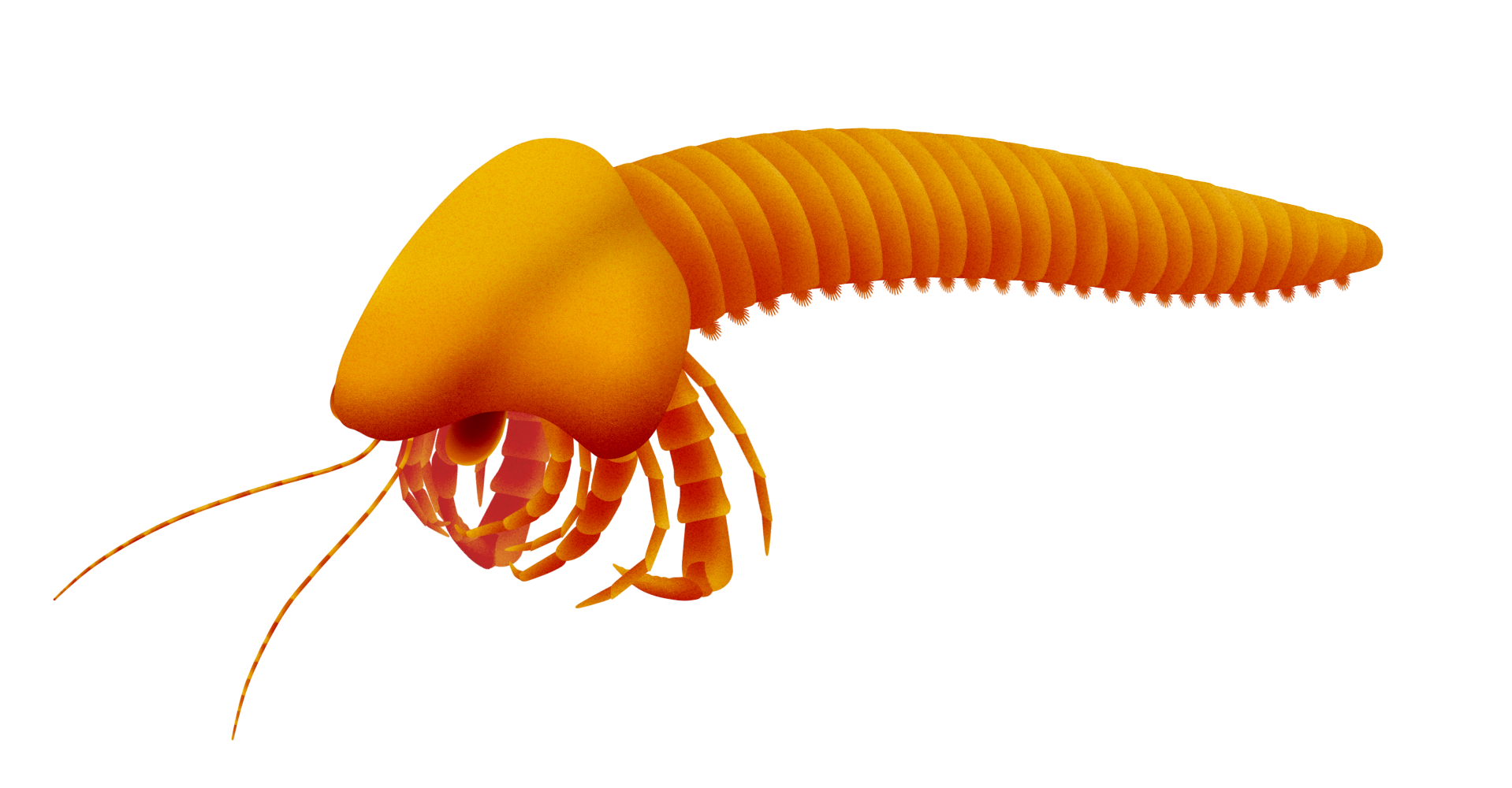
Acheronauta, a possible mandibulate arthropod from the Waukesha biota.

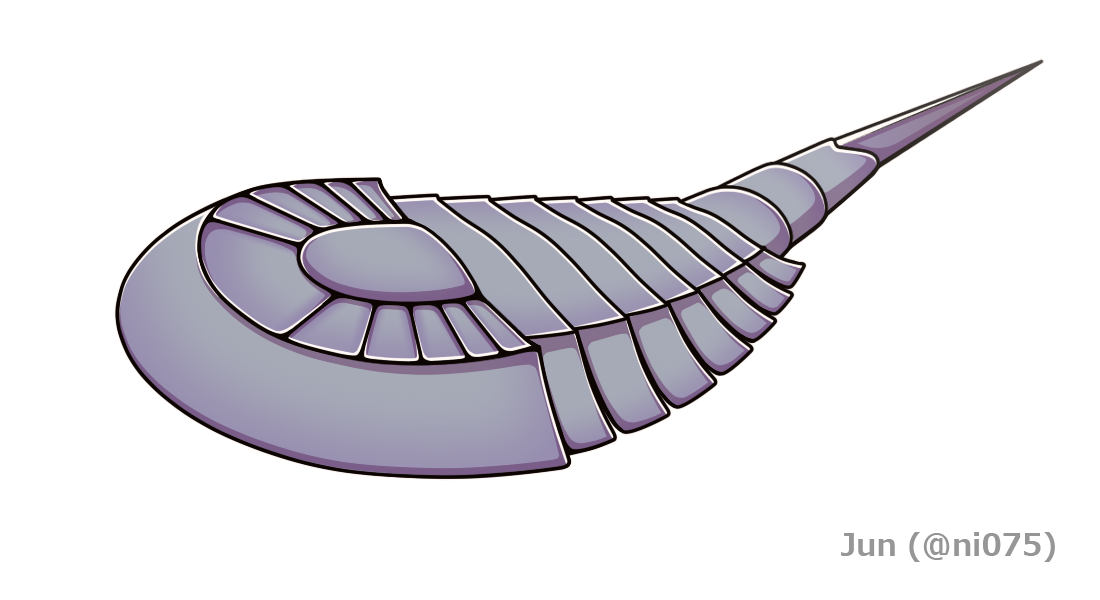
Venustulus, a synziphosurine arthropod and a distant relative to modern horseshoe crabs from the Waukesha Biota.

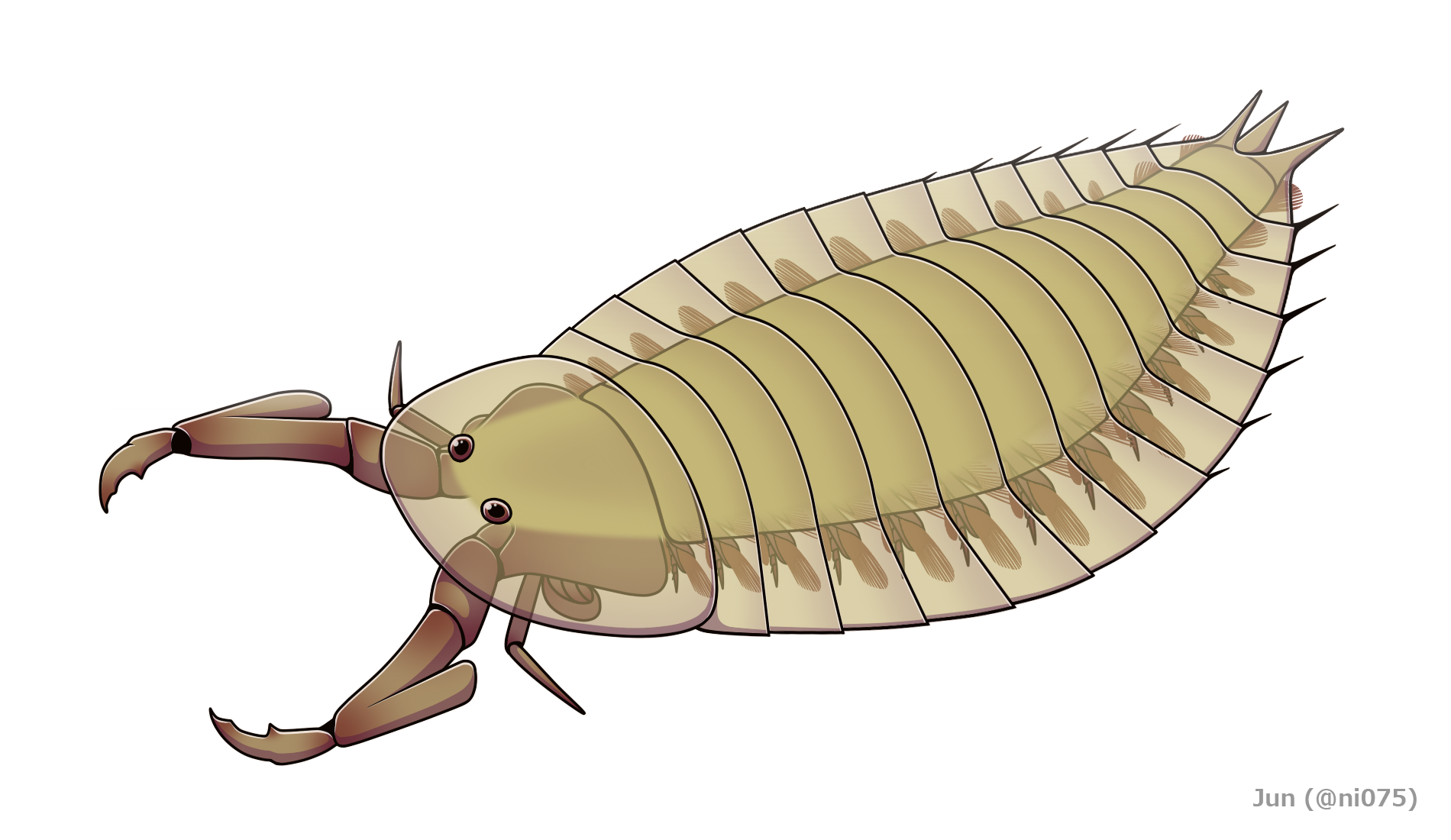
Parioscorpio, an enigmatic arthropod from the Waukesha biota that has been thought of as a crustacean, a trilobite relative, or a scorpion.

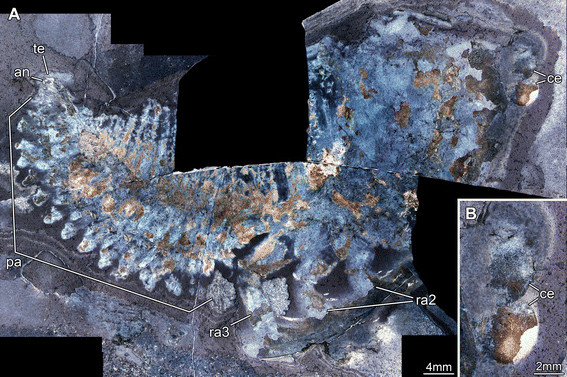
Thylacares, a thylacocephalan arthropod from the Waukesha Biota. Unlike most other members of its grouping, Thylacares had small eyes, and a smaller stomach.

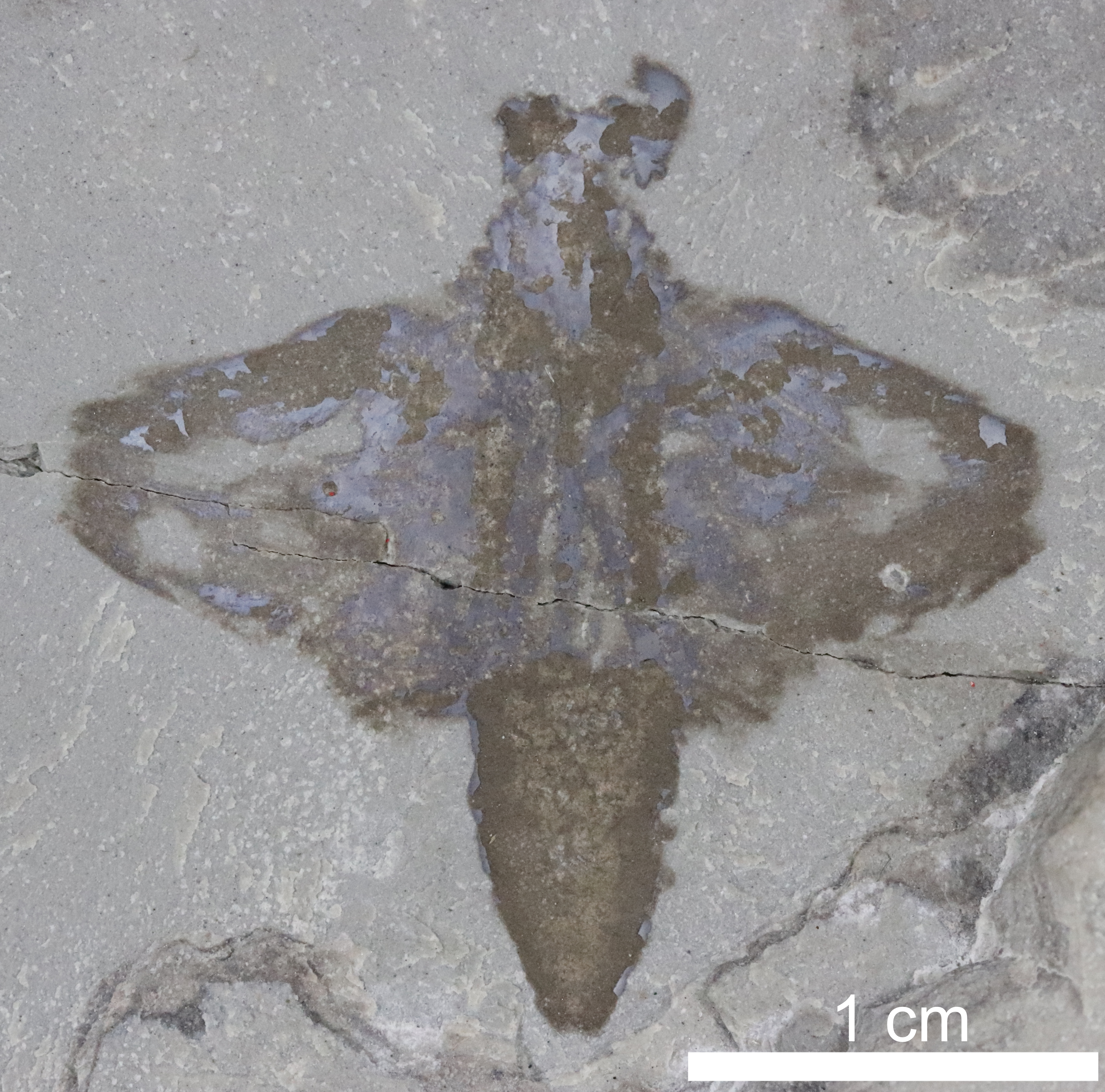
A specimen of the “Waukesha Butterfly Animal”, an unnamed enigmatic arthropod from the Waukesha biota, nicknamed due to its carapace resembling the wings of a butterfly (which it is not related to).

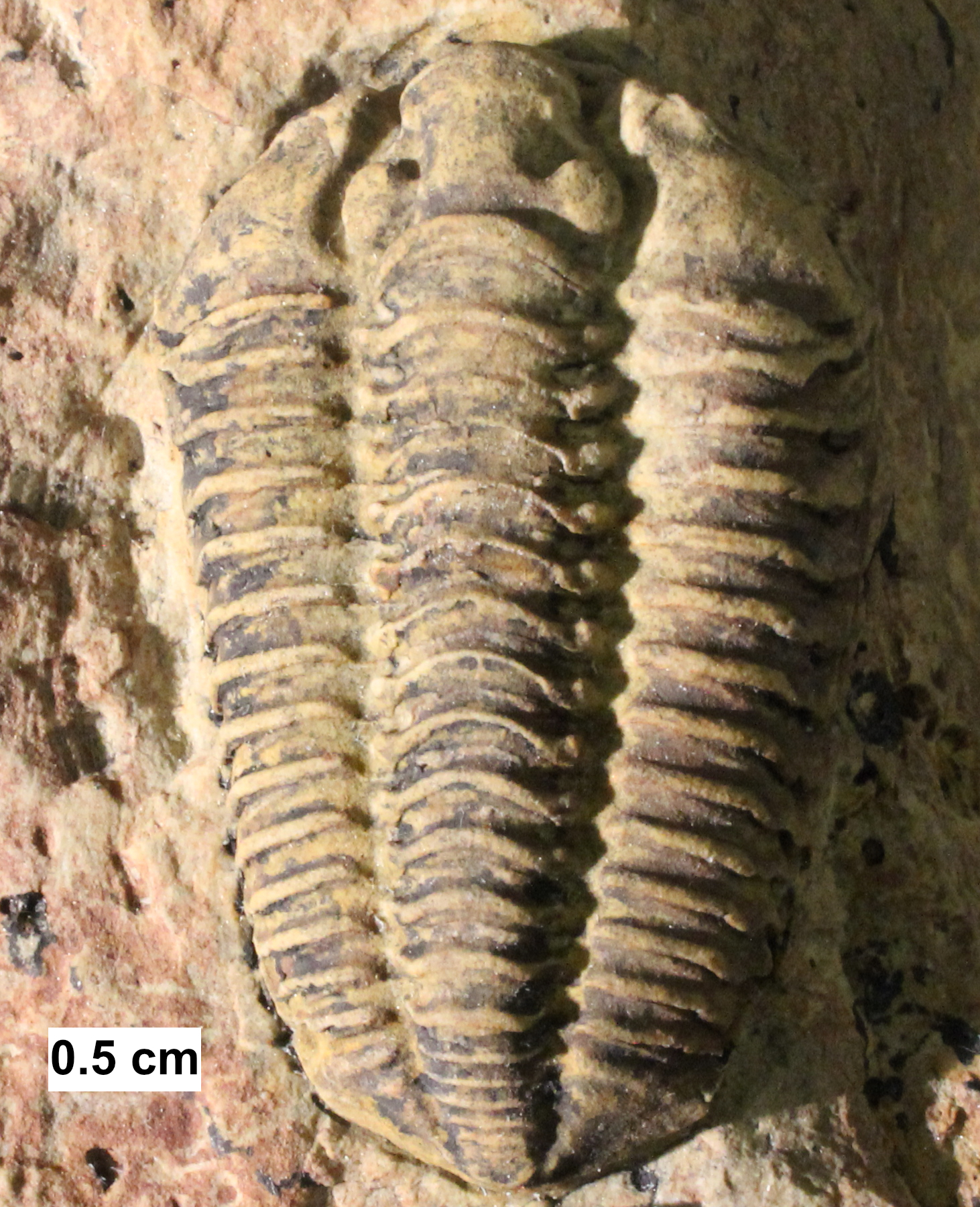
MPM 34493, A Calymene celebra specimen from the Racine Dolomite Formation

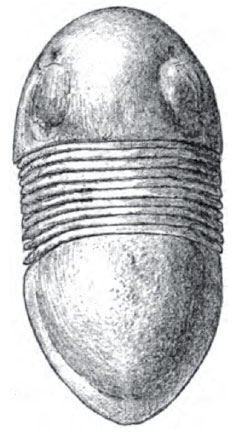
Bumastus niagarensis was a styginid trilobite from southeastern Wisconsin

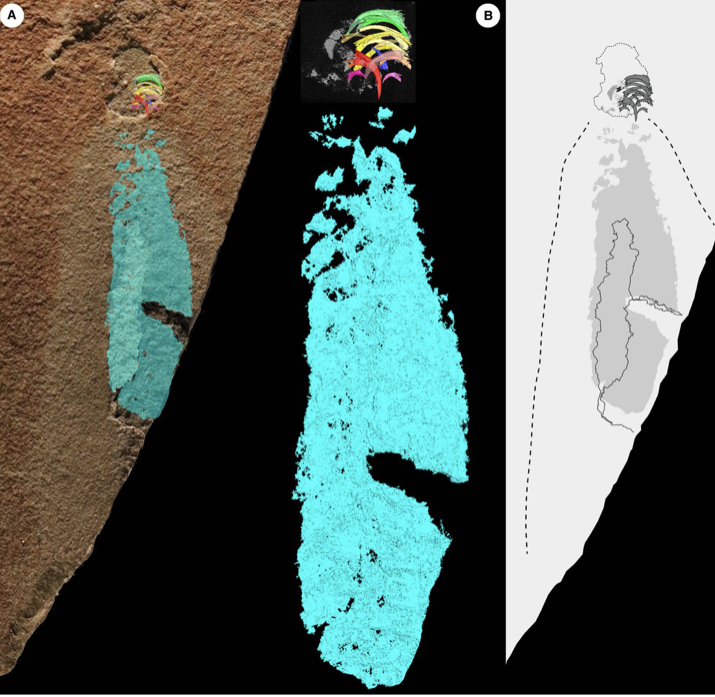
Panderodus was a conodont that lived throughout the early Paleozoic. This particular specimen was collected in Waukesha

=== Devonian ===
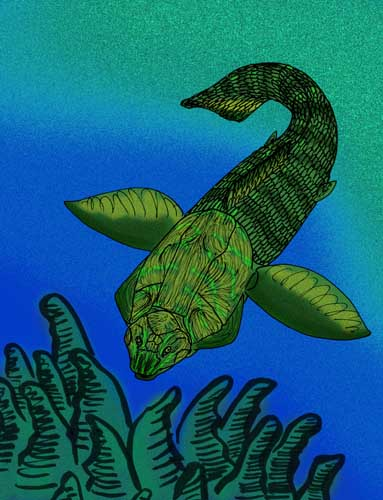
The Arthrodire Placoderm Holonema rugosum which has been found in Devonian deposits of several states including Wisconsin

Four Devonian formations are located in the southeastern portion of Wisconsin in the vicinity of Milwaukee. While all are fossiliferous to some degree, the youngest is entirely sub-surface, and the others are very limited in exposure and mostly inaccessible, except for occasional glacial erratics found in excavations and along the shore of Lake Michigan. In spite of its elusiveness, one unit---the Milwaukee Formation---has been found to have one of the most diverse biotas of its age (late Givetian) coming from a single formation. Its fossil biota includes around 250 species of agglutinated foraminifers, radiolarians, chitinozoans, conulariids, rugose and tabulate corals, tentaculitoids, bryozoans, hederelloids, brachiopods, hyoliths, gastropods, rostroconchs, bivalves, nautiloids, actinoceratoids, ammonoids, annelid worms (scolecodonts), trilobites, ostracods, phyllocarids, crinoids, blastoids, edrioasteroids, graptolites, conodont elements, fishes (placoderms, sharks, acanthodians, sarcopterygians), terrestrial fungi, and land plants (cladoxylopsids? and lycopods). It also includes many types of trace fossils.

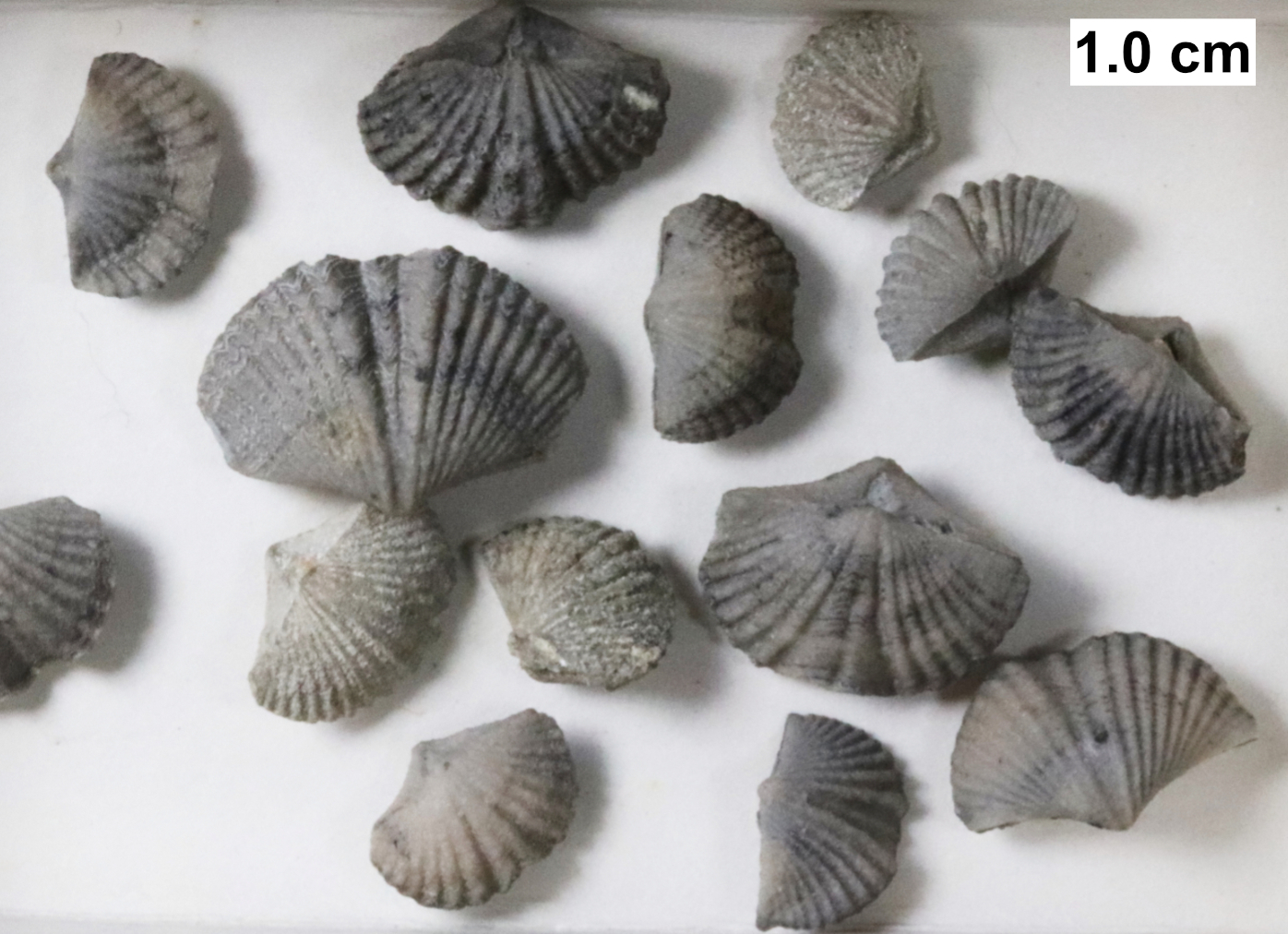
The Devonian brachiopod Tylothyris from the Milwaukee Formation.

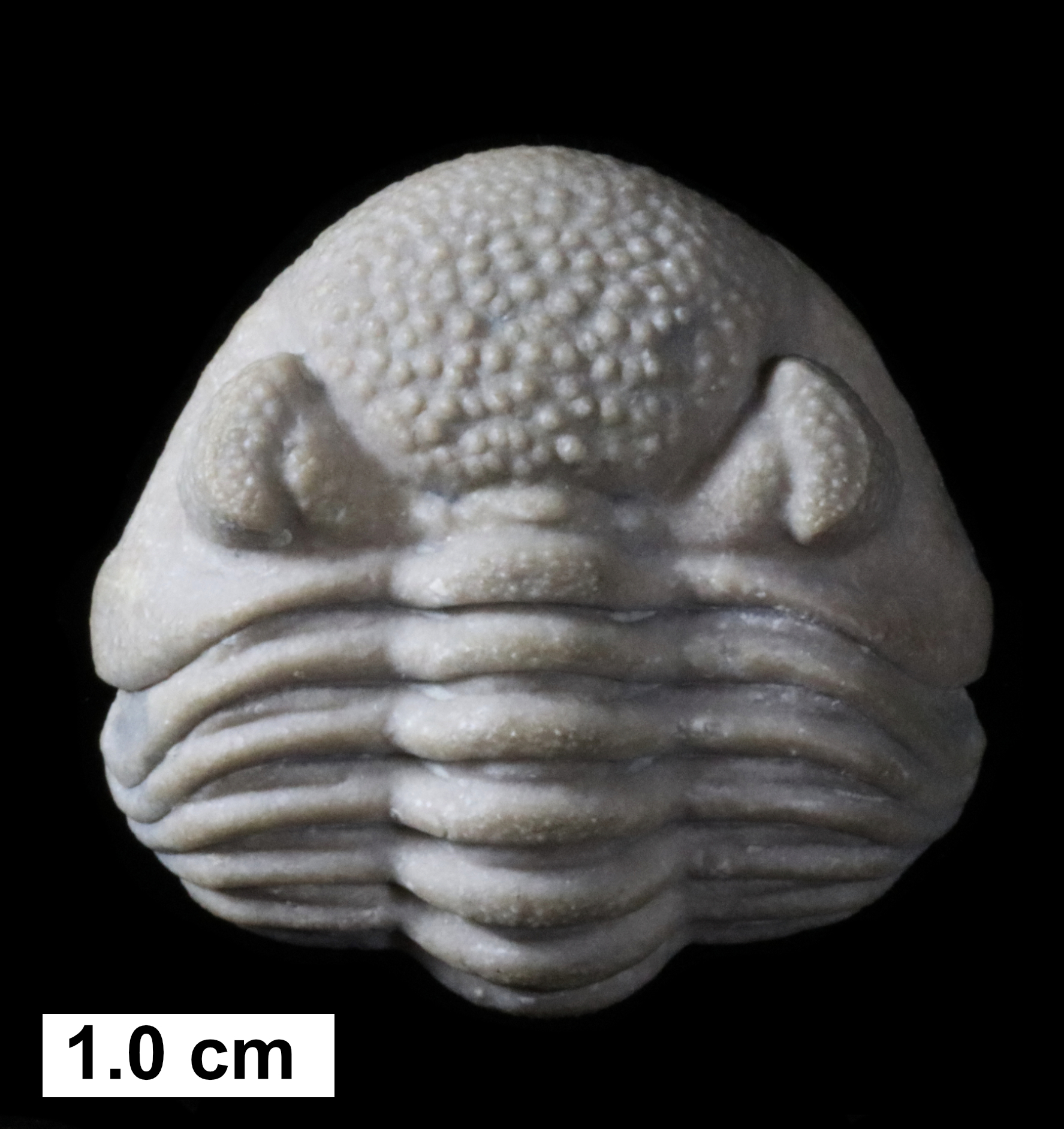
The Devonian trilobite Eldredgeops norwoodensis (Stumm, 1953) from the Milwaukee Formation.

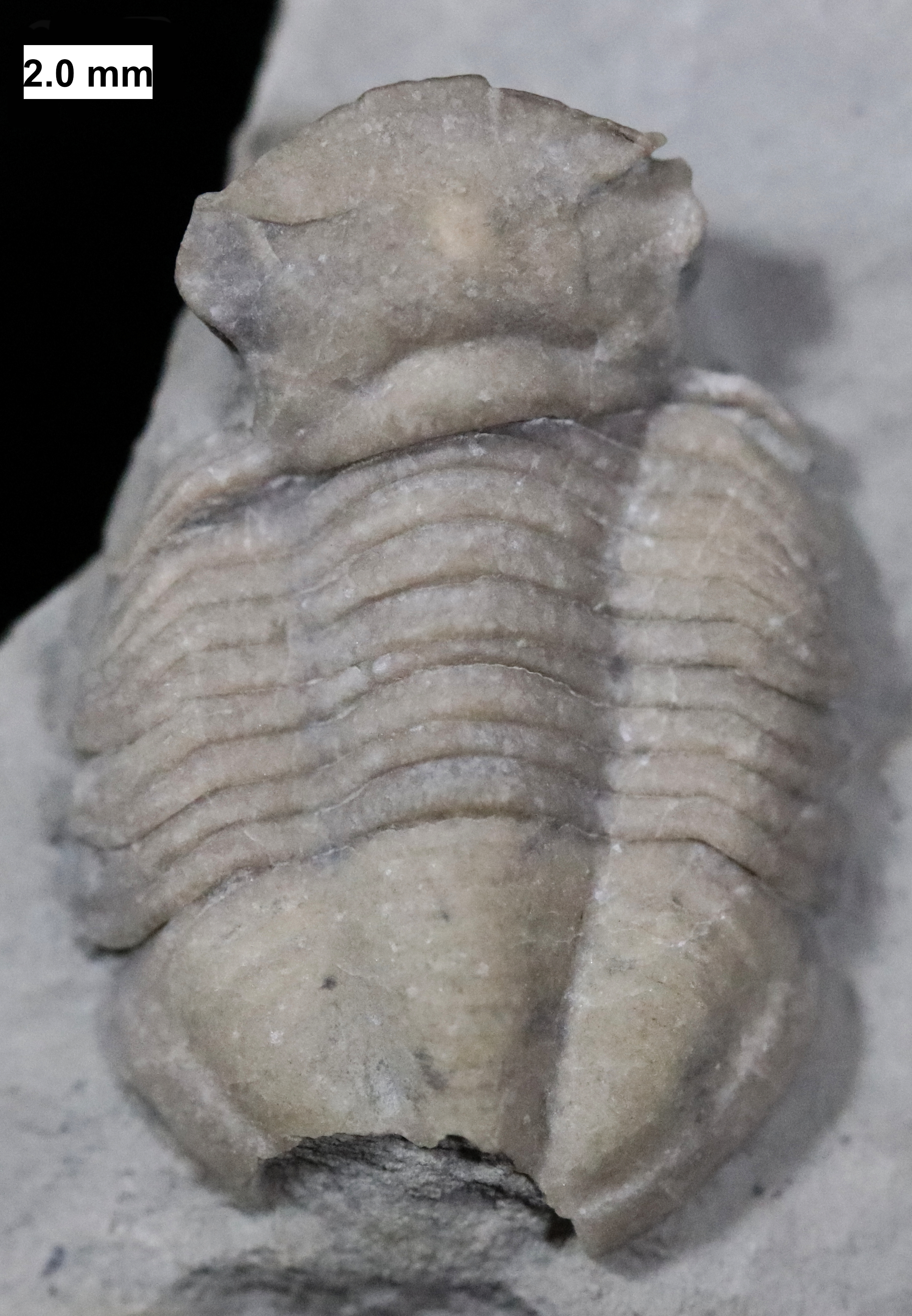
The Devonian trilobite Crassiproetus from Milwaukee Formation.

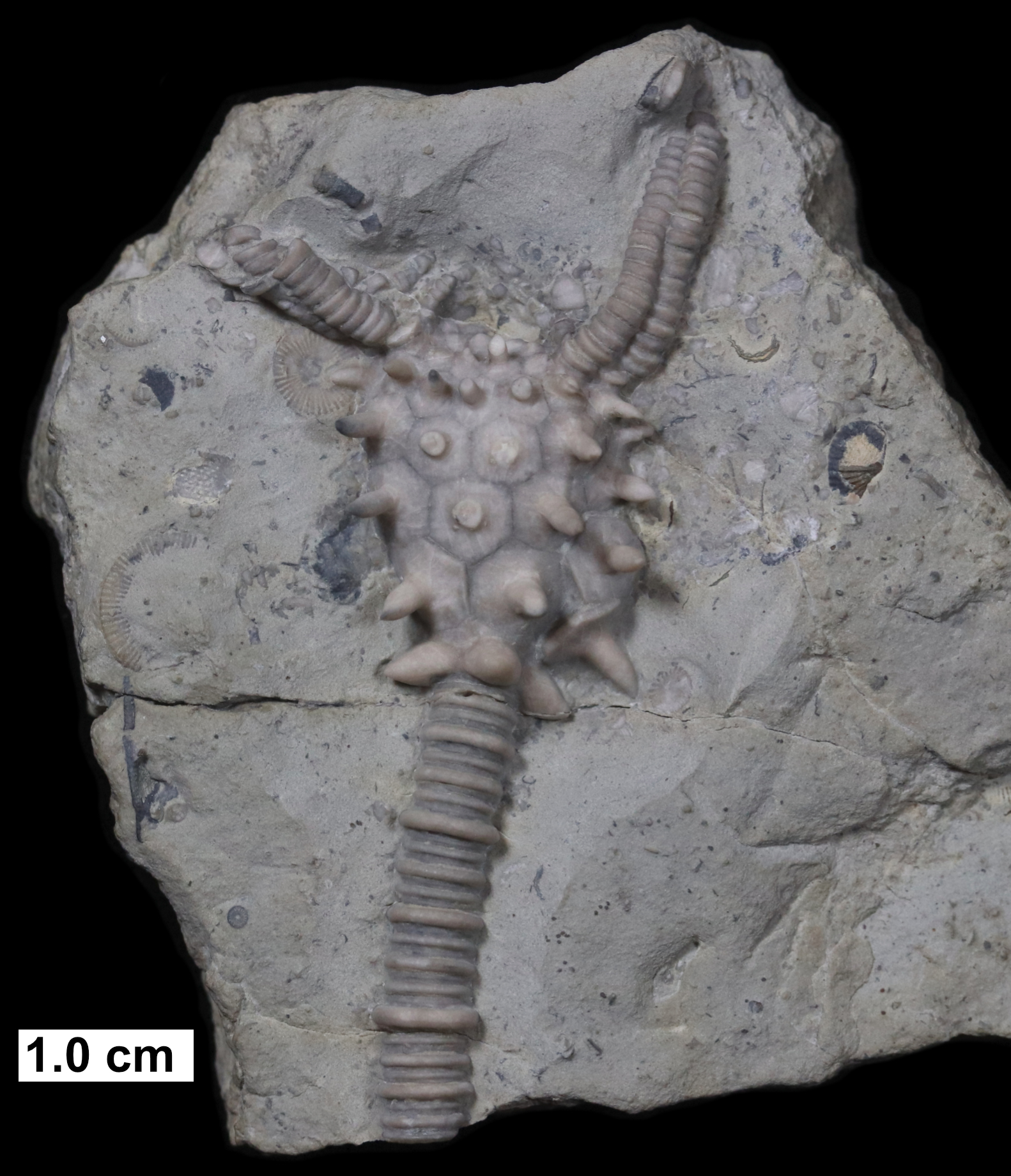
Melocrinites nodosus spinosus (Weller, 1898), a spiny, stalked crinoid from the Milwaukee Formation.

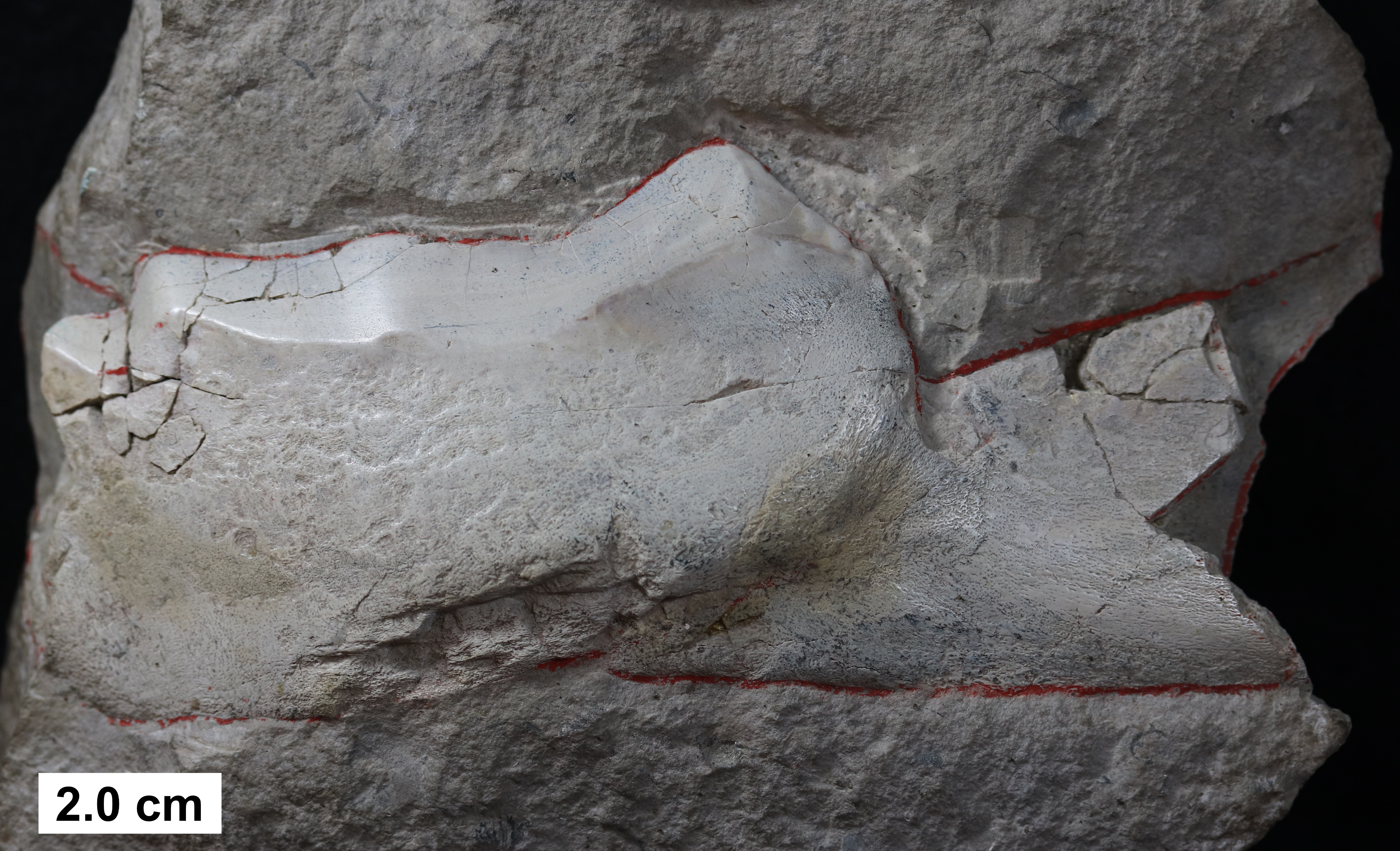
IG plate (lower jaw) from the Devonian placoderm Eastmanosteus pustulosus (Eastman, 1897) from the Milwaukee Formation.

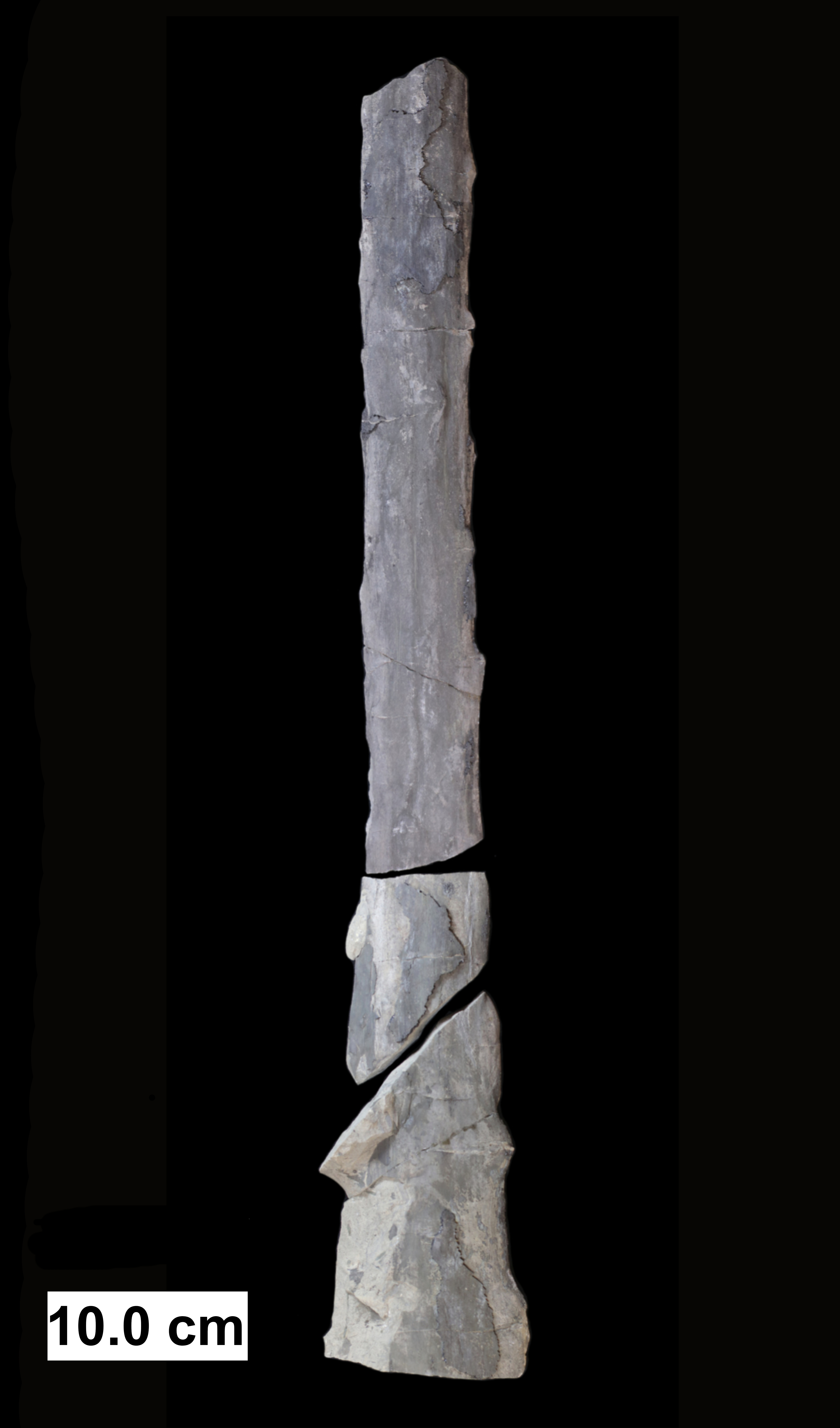
Prototaxites milwaukeensis (Penhallow, 1908), a large fungus initially thought to be a marine alga, from the Milwaukee Formation.

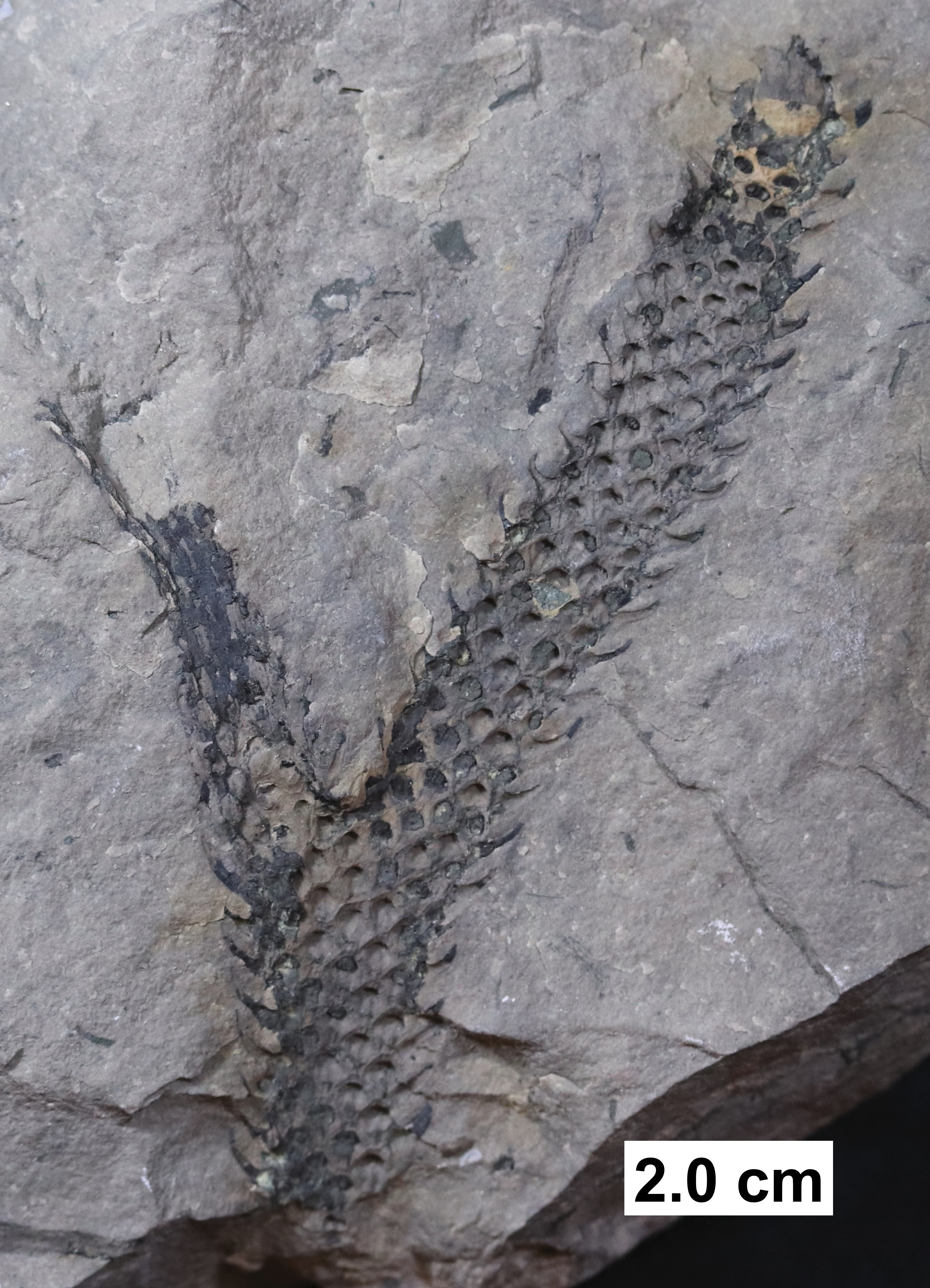
Lycopod axis (branch) from the Milwaukee Formation.

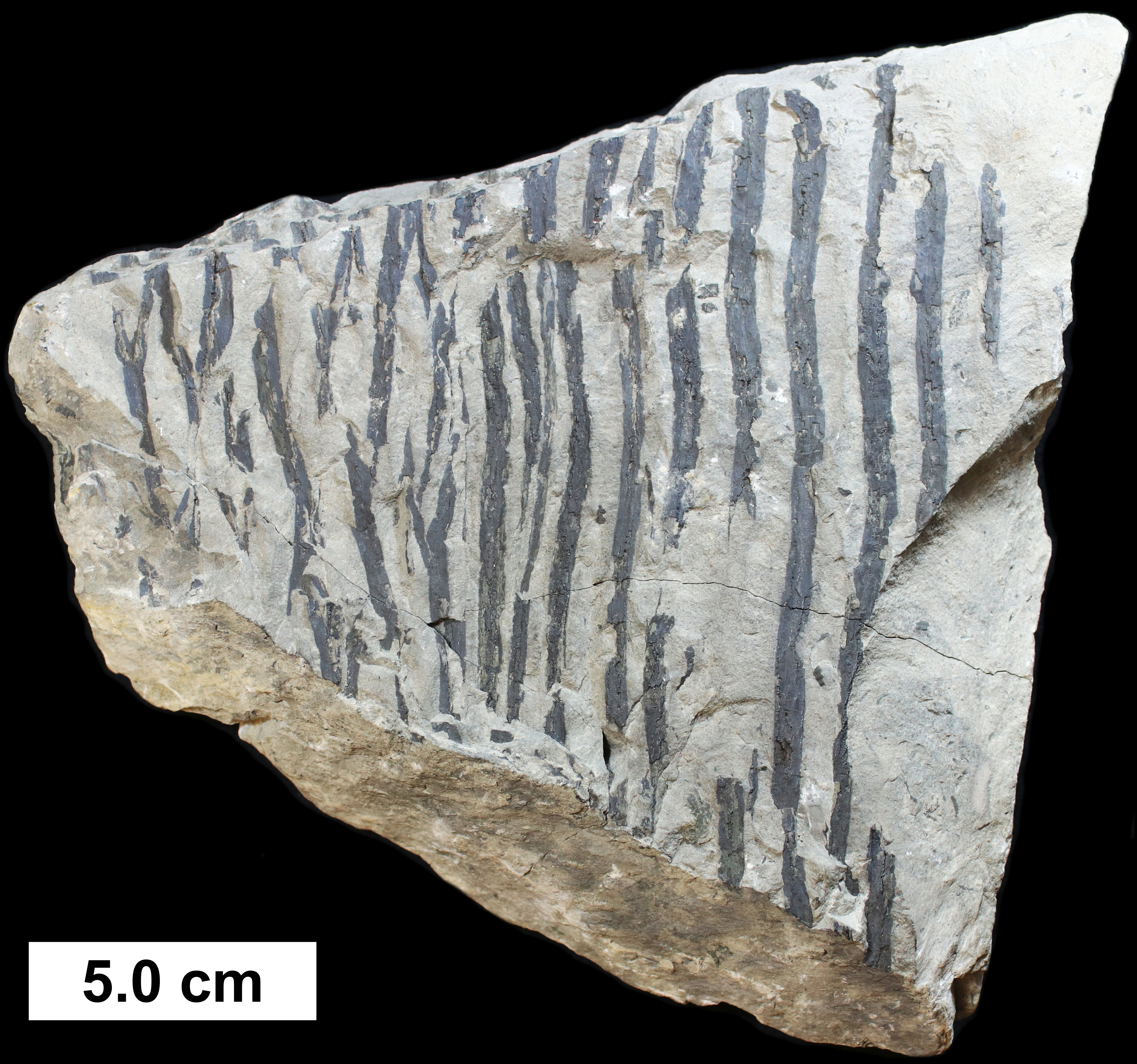
Bark (possibly from a cladoxylopsid) initially thought to be a marine alga, from the Milwaukee Formation.

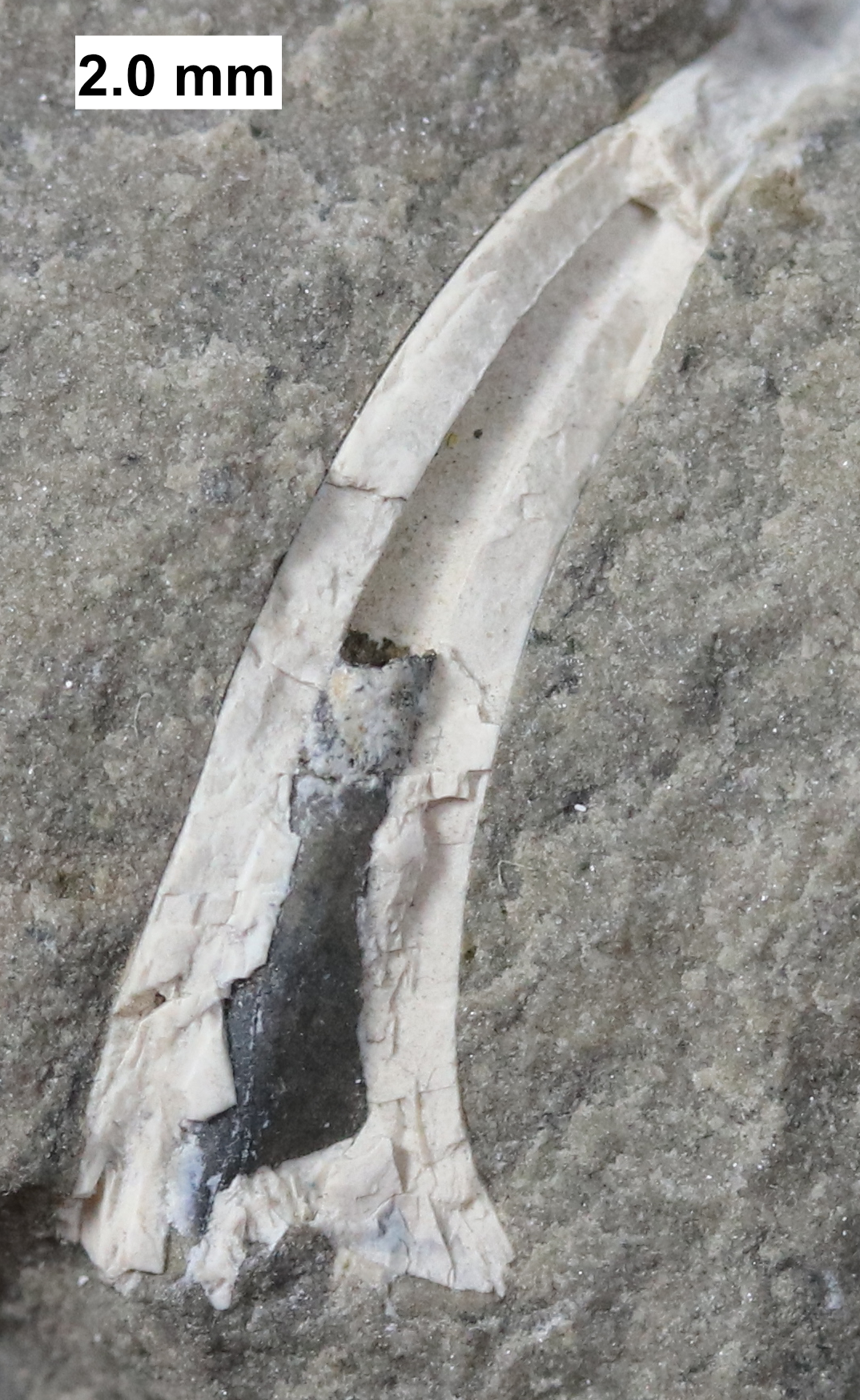
The tooth of the sarcopterygian fish Onychodus from the Milwaukee Formation.

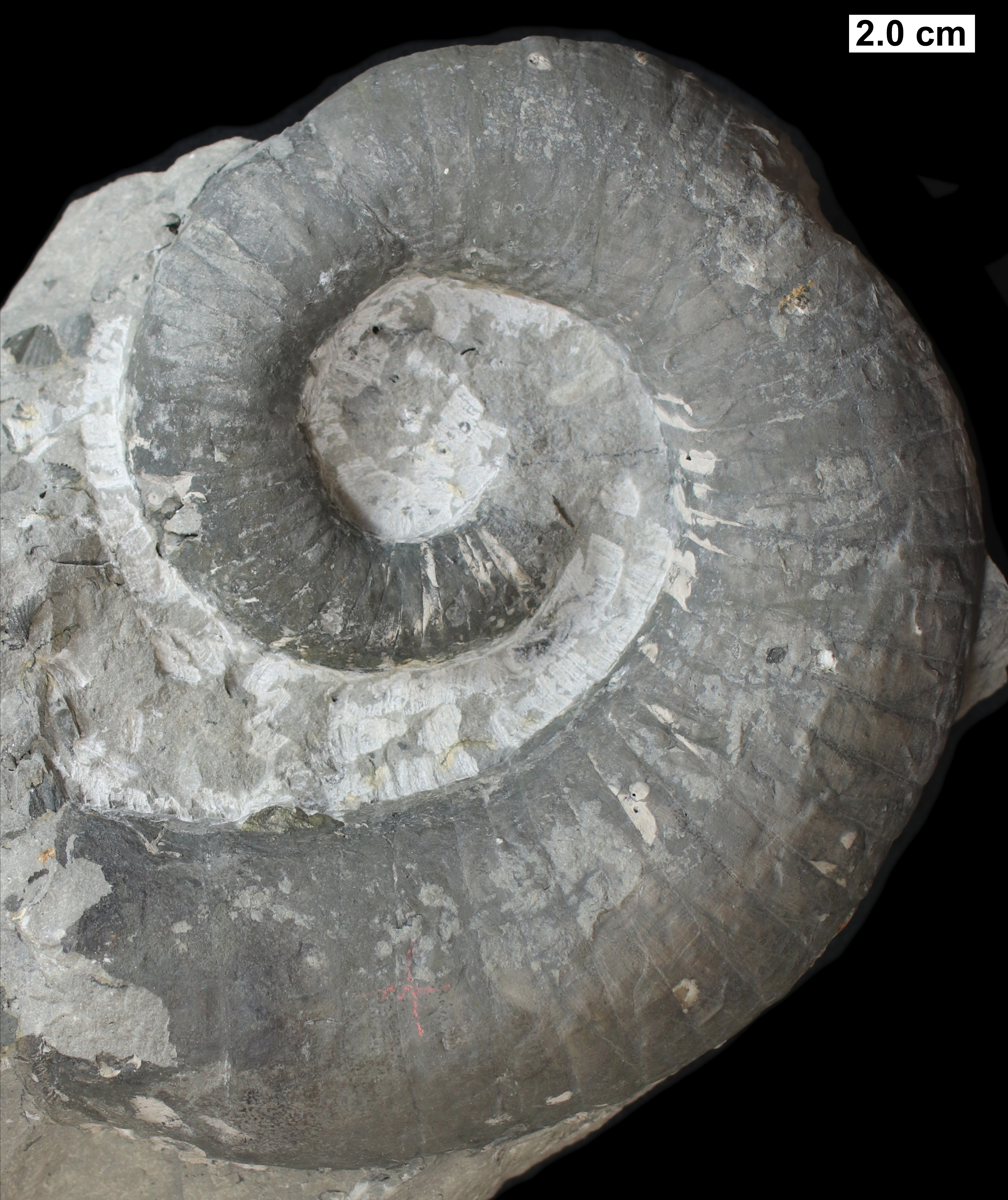
The shell of the nautiloid cephalopod Gyronaedyceras from the Milwaukee Formation.

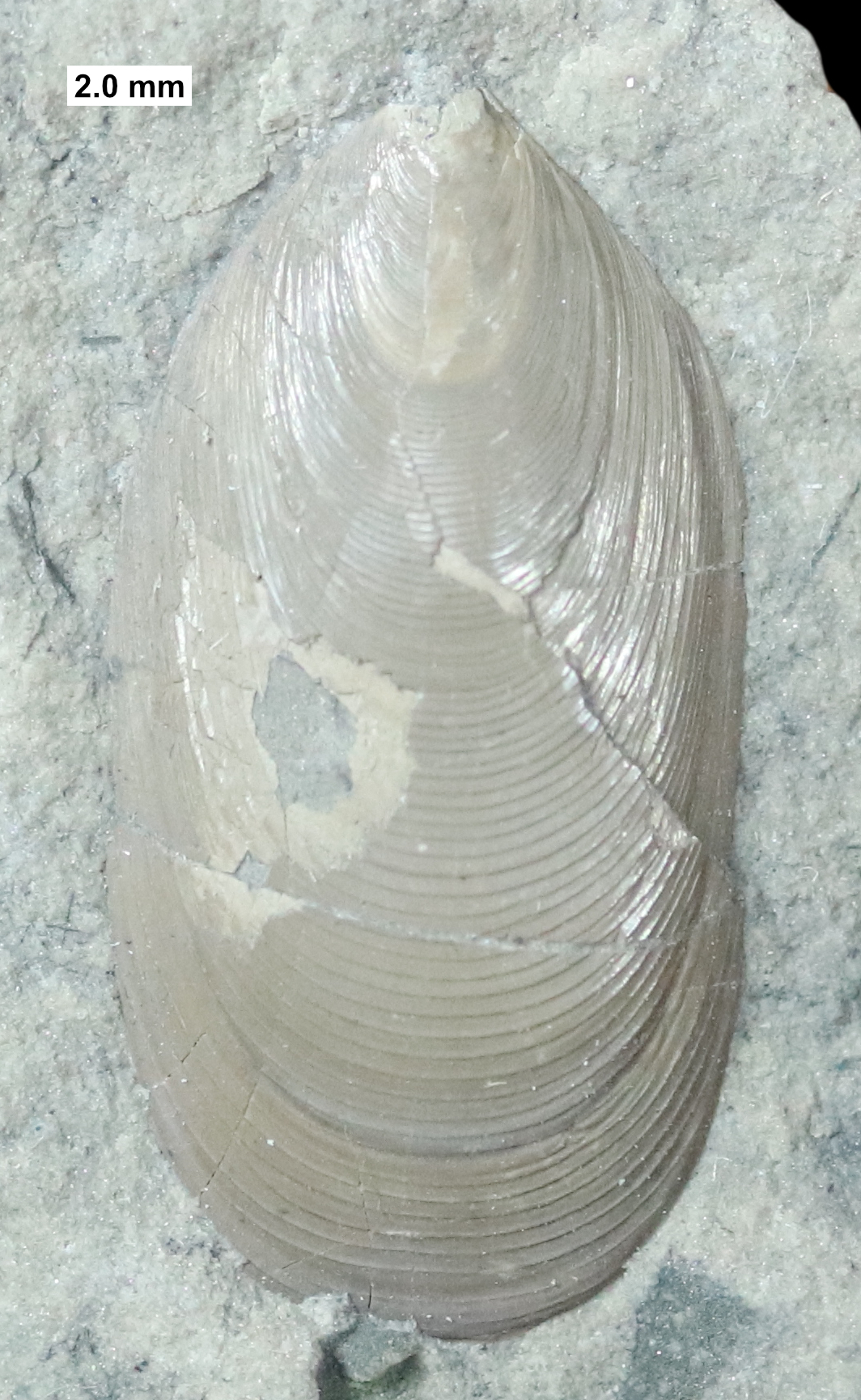
The Lingulid brachiopod Barroisella from the Milwaukee Formation.

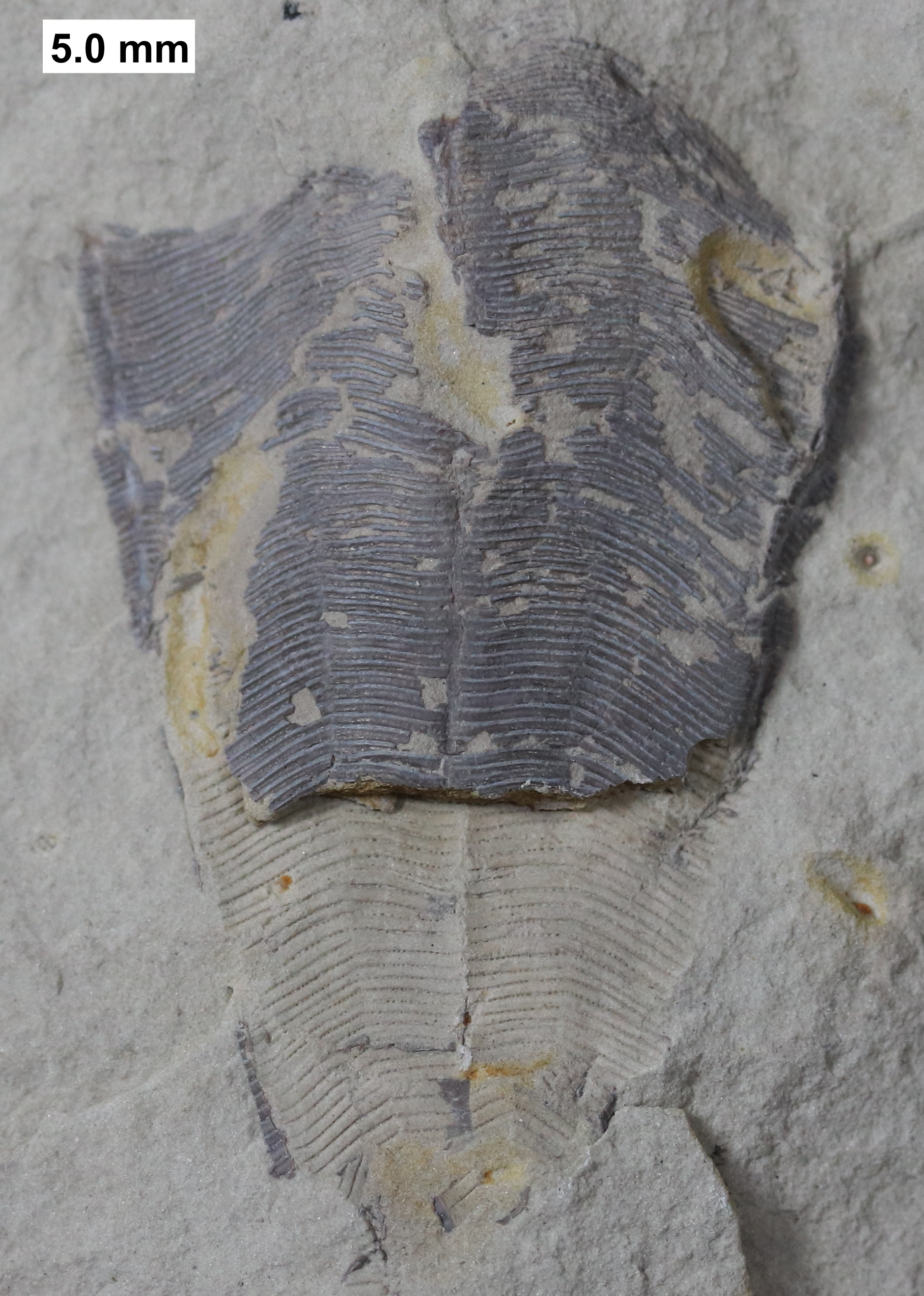
The conlariid Conularia milwaukeensis from the Milwaukee Formation.

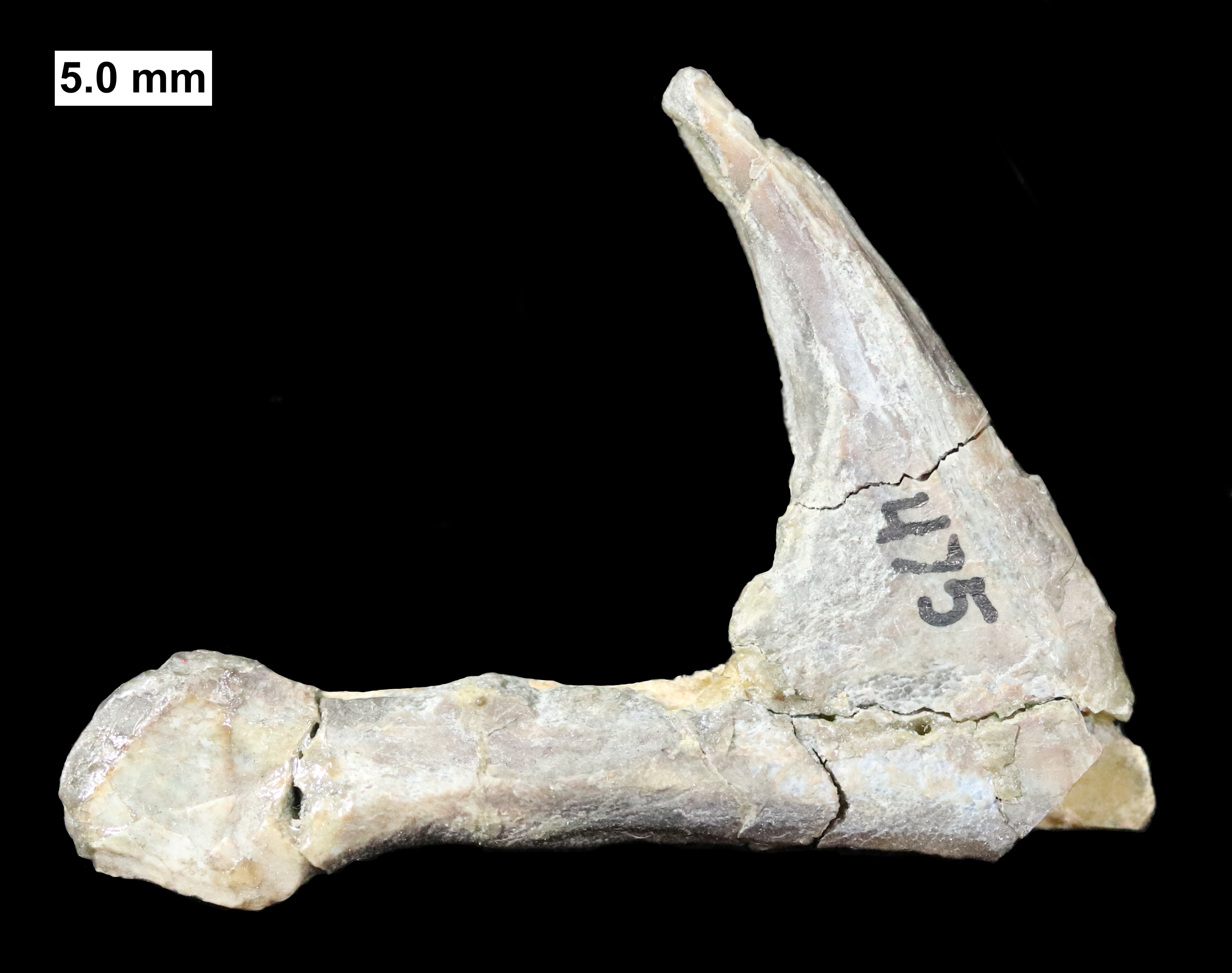
The tooth plate of a ptyctodontid placoderm from the Milwaukee Formation.

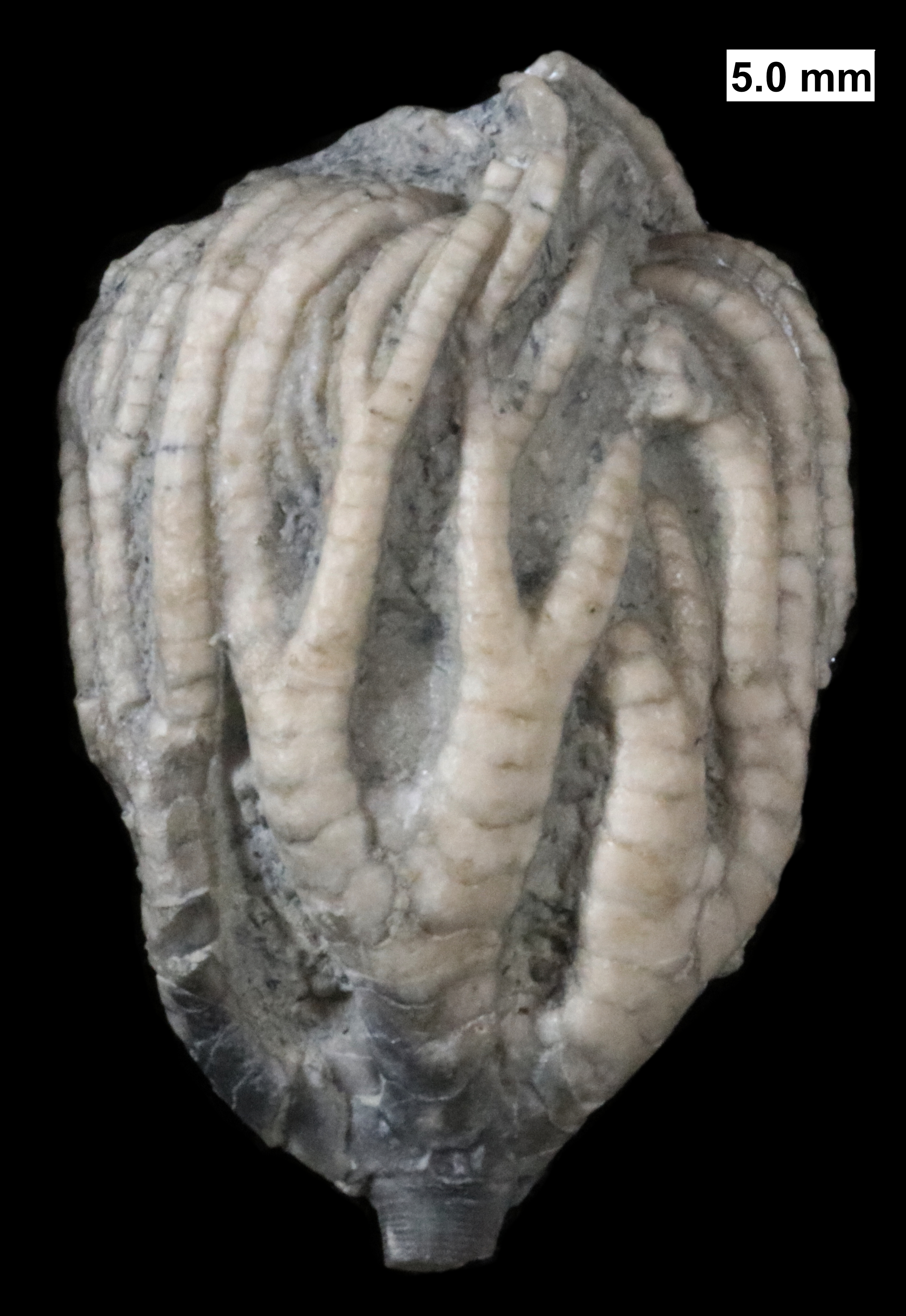
The calyx of the crinoid Taxocrinus from the Milwaukee Formation.

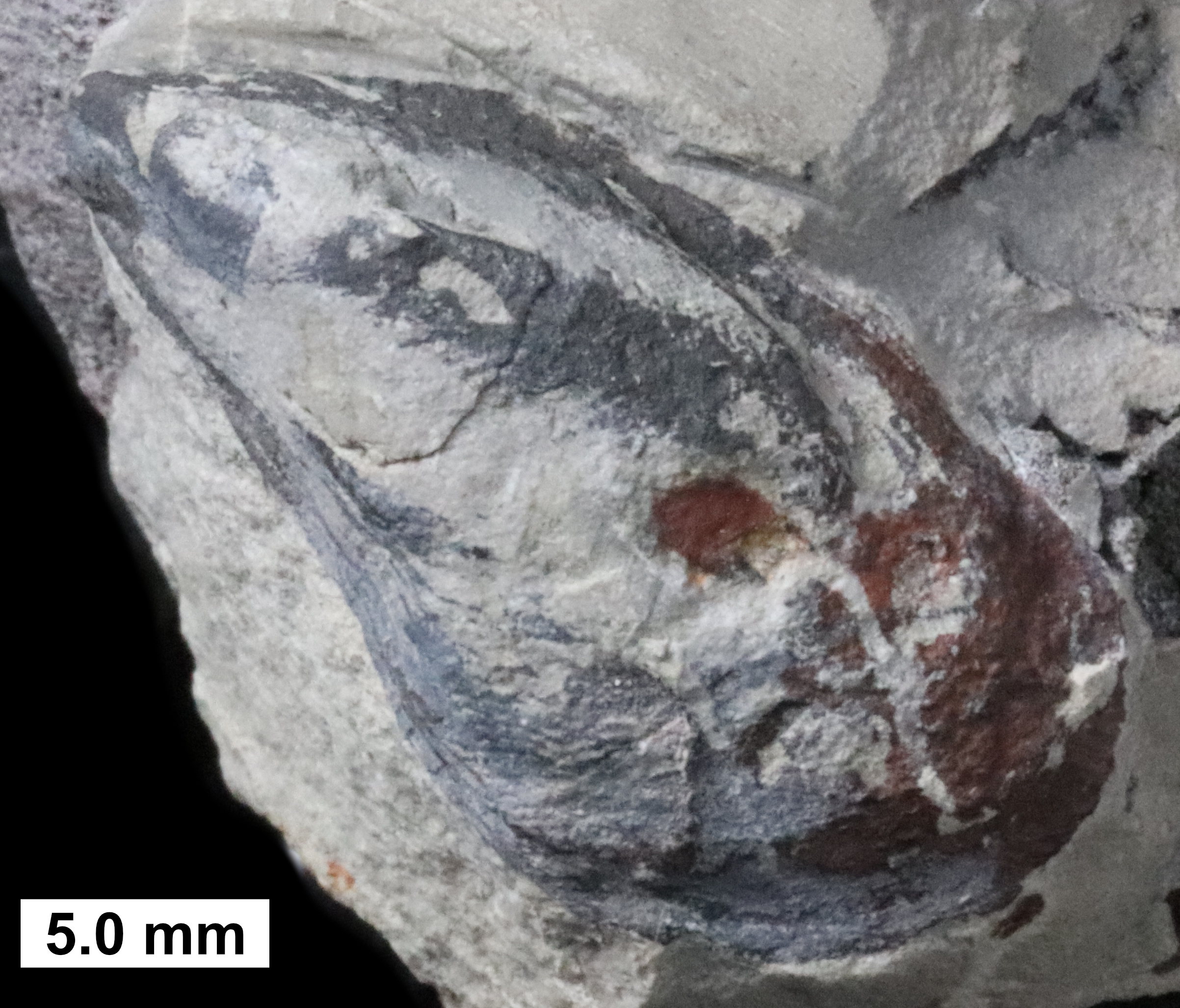
The bivalve mollusk Mytilarca from the Milwaukee Formation.

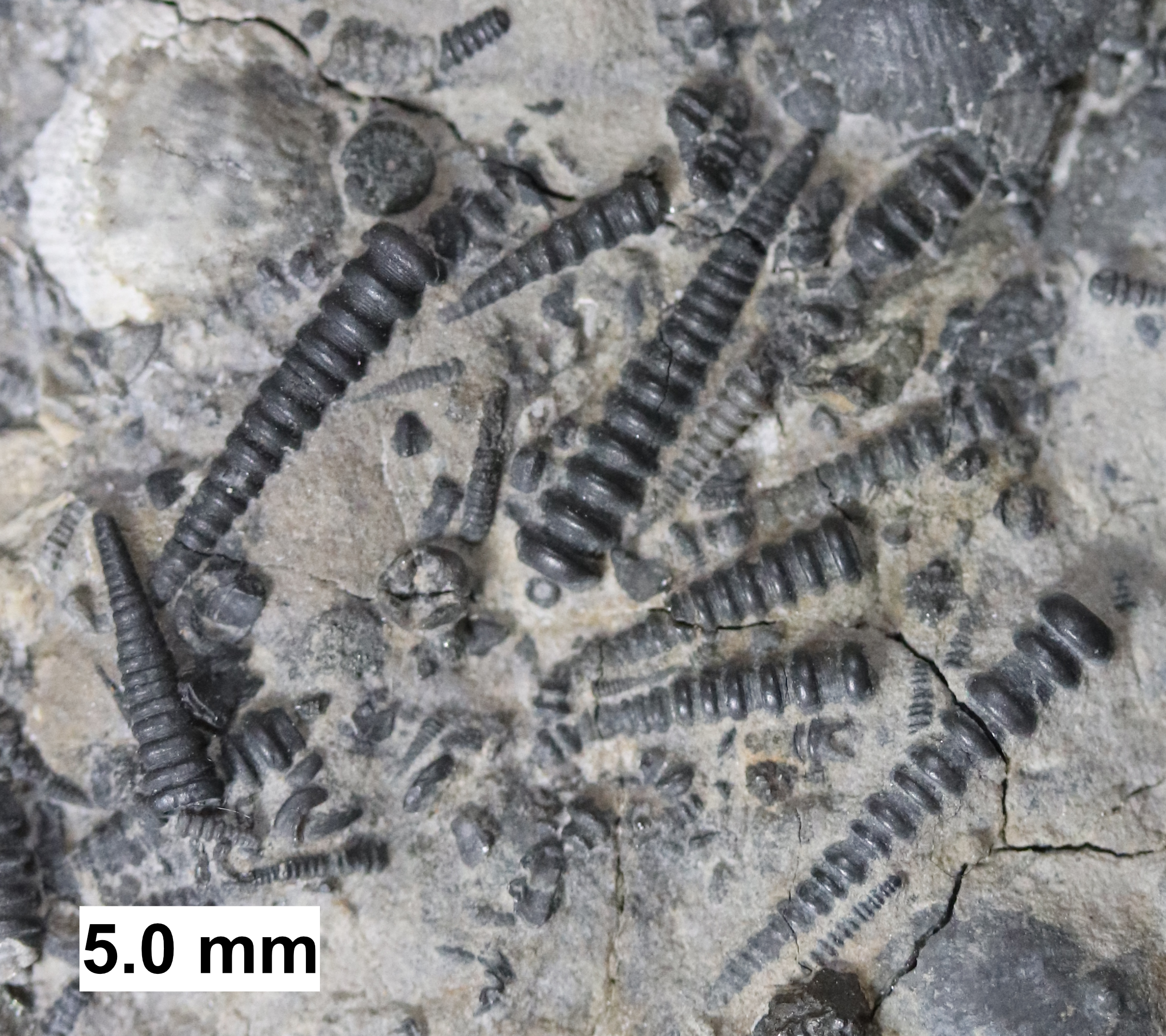
A cluster of Tentaculites from the Milwaukee Formation.

=== Permian-Neogene ===
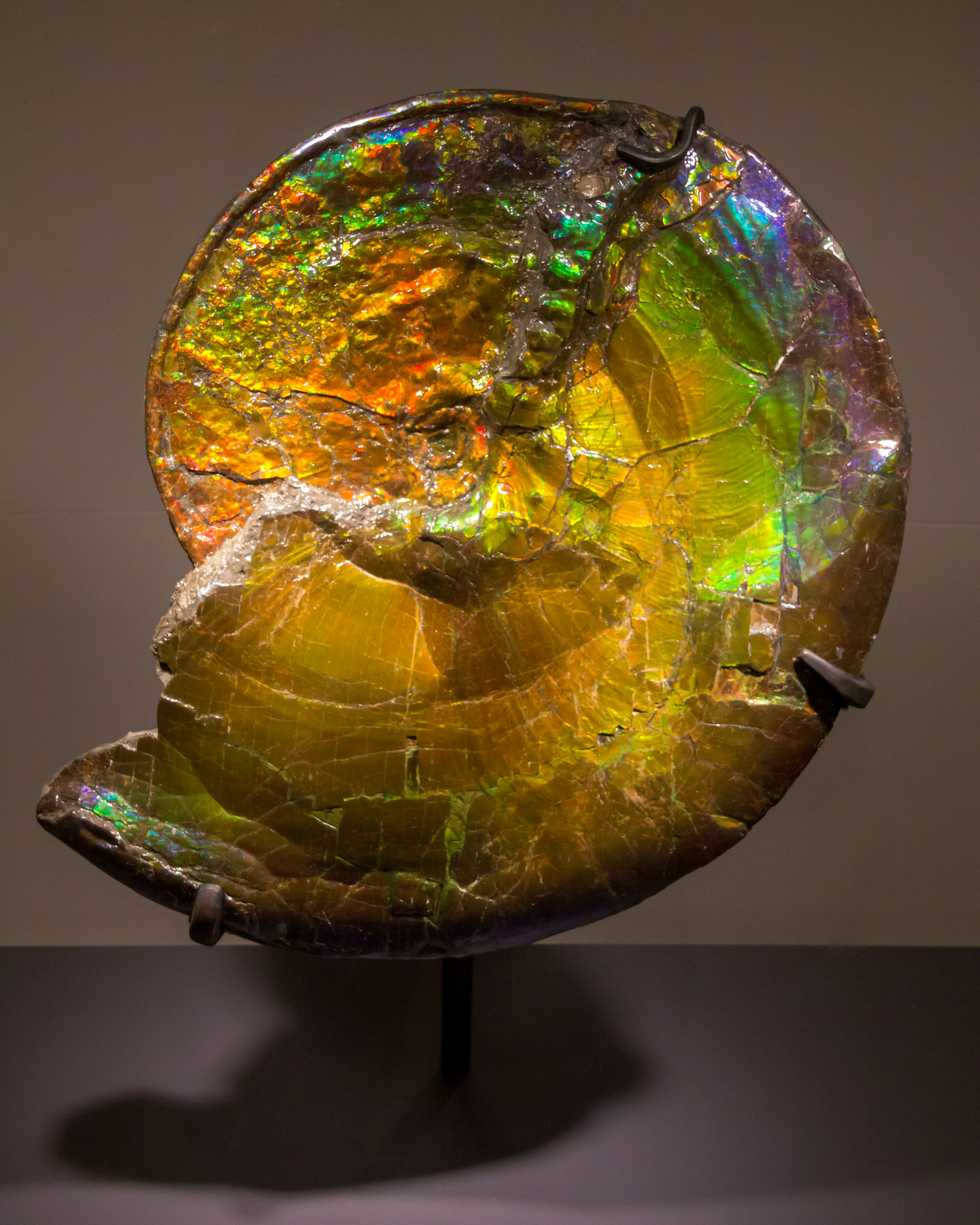
Placenticeras, one of the few Mesozoic animals found in Wisconsin

Rocks of Permian to Neogene age were either rarely deposited in Wisconsin or were eroded away by the Pleistocene glaciers and other erosional agents. As a result, dinosaurs and other organisms of this age did not leave many fossils in Wisconsin. The sole exception are some ammonite fossils originating from the glacial till of the middle Turonian Coleraine Formation and dating to the epoch of the Late Cretaceous, including Placenticeras pseudoplacenta and Scaphites carlilensis.

However, a 2021 study of gastroliths found in the Morrison Formation in Wyoming matched 1.8 billion year rocks to those from Wisconsin, specifically the Baraboo Formation, suggesting sauropod dinosaurs migrated to the state at the time.

=== Quaternary ===
During the Quaternary, deposition resumed; however, the local climate was cold and glaciers would come to cover nearly all of the state's land area. Wisconsin contains sediment from all of the Pleistocene glacial stages, especially the stage that bears the state's name. Hemlock and spruce trees formed forests inhabited by creatures like giant beavers, horses, deer, and woolly mammoths.

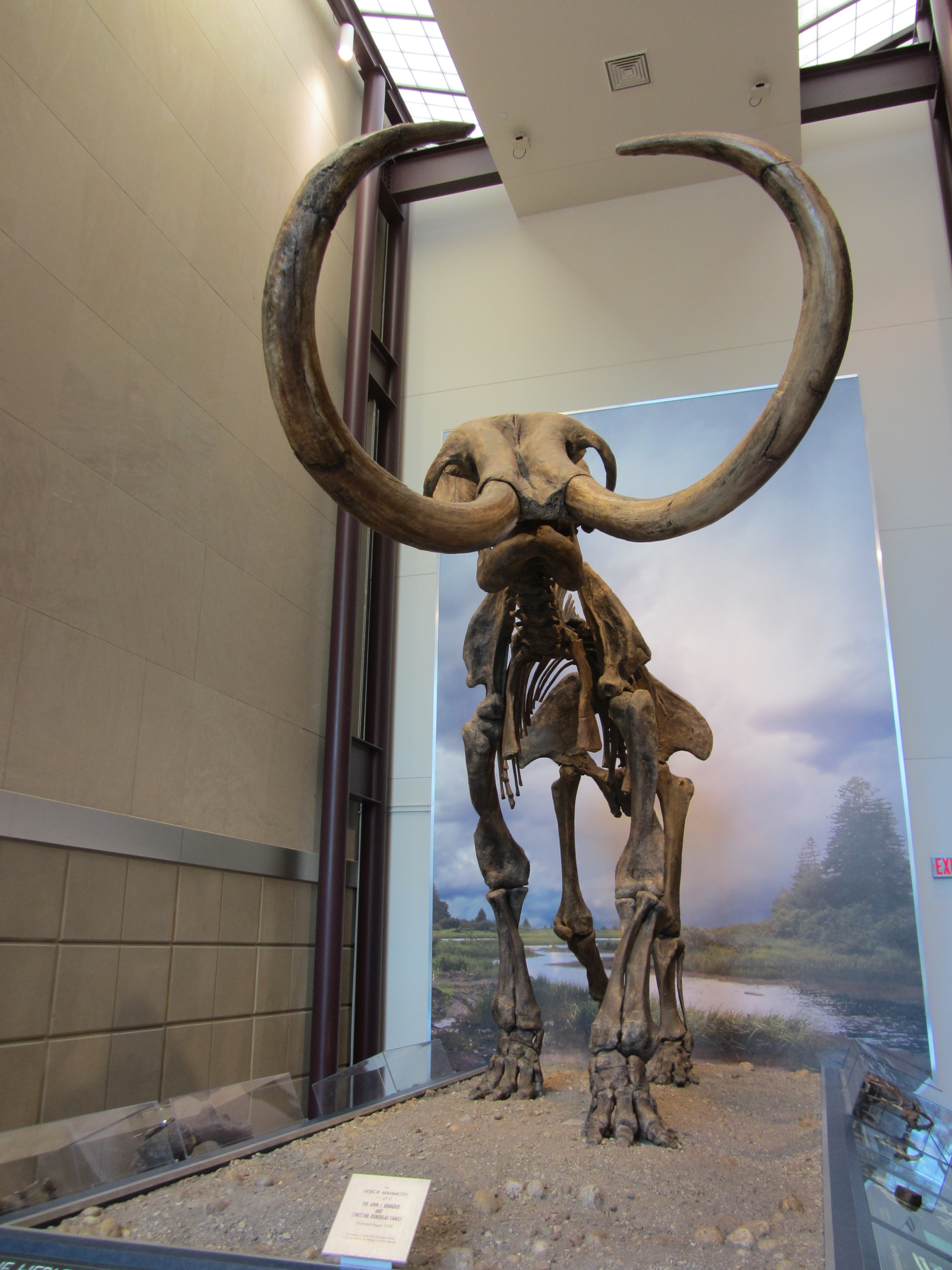
The Hebior Mammoth, found near the small town of Paris, Wisconsin. Currently in the atrium of the Milwaukee Public Museum.

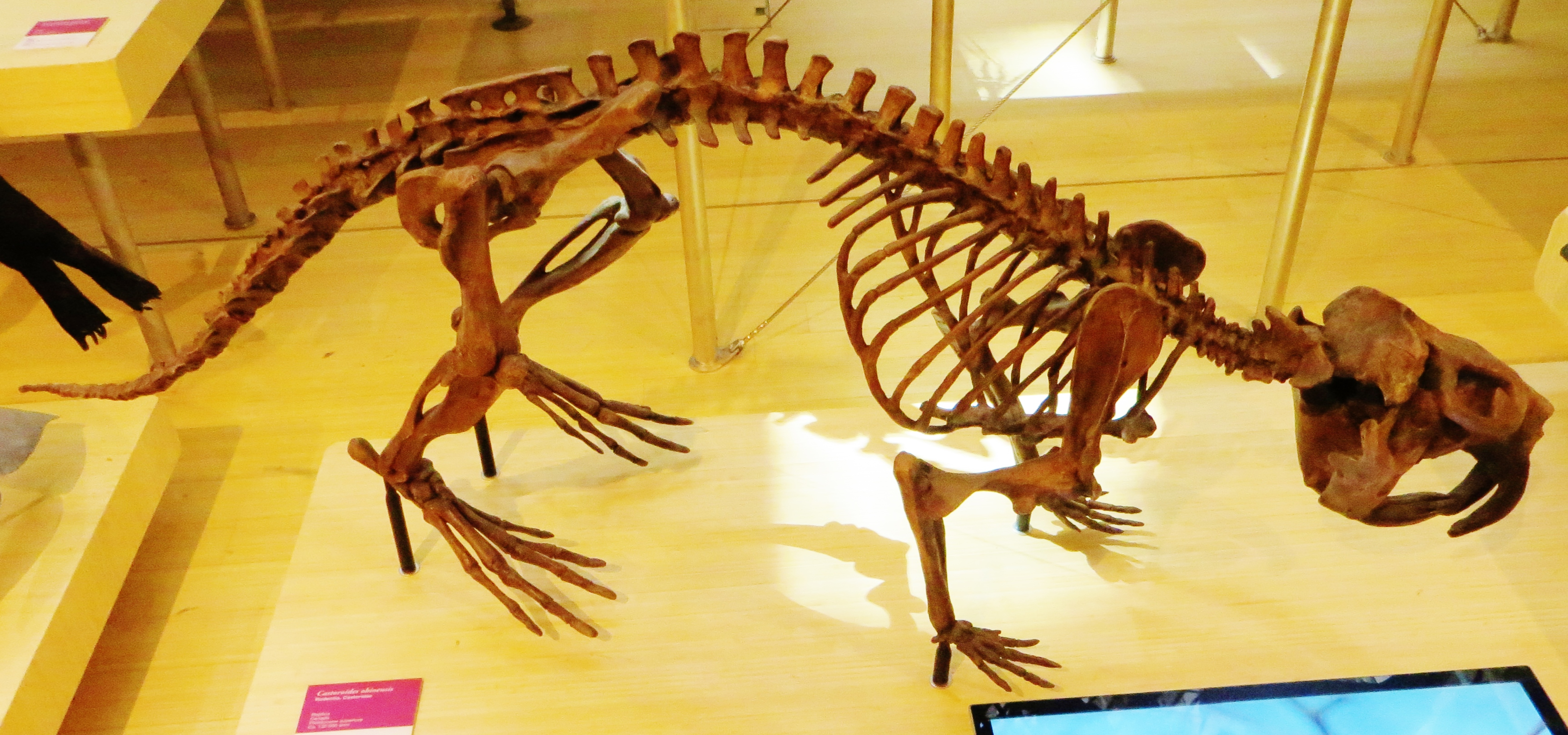
Castoroides lived in many parts of North america, including Wisconsin

== History ==
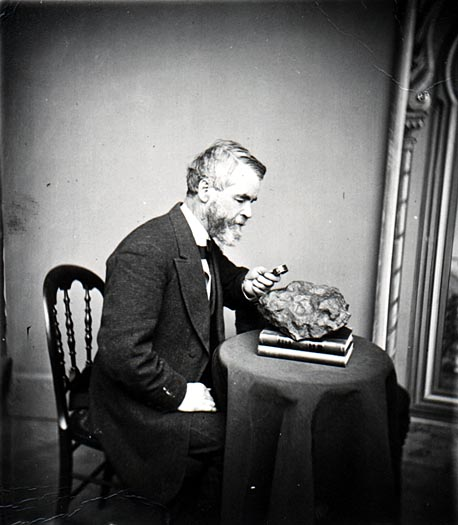
Lapham examining a meteorite which had fallen in Wisconsin in 1868

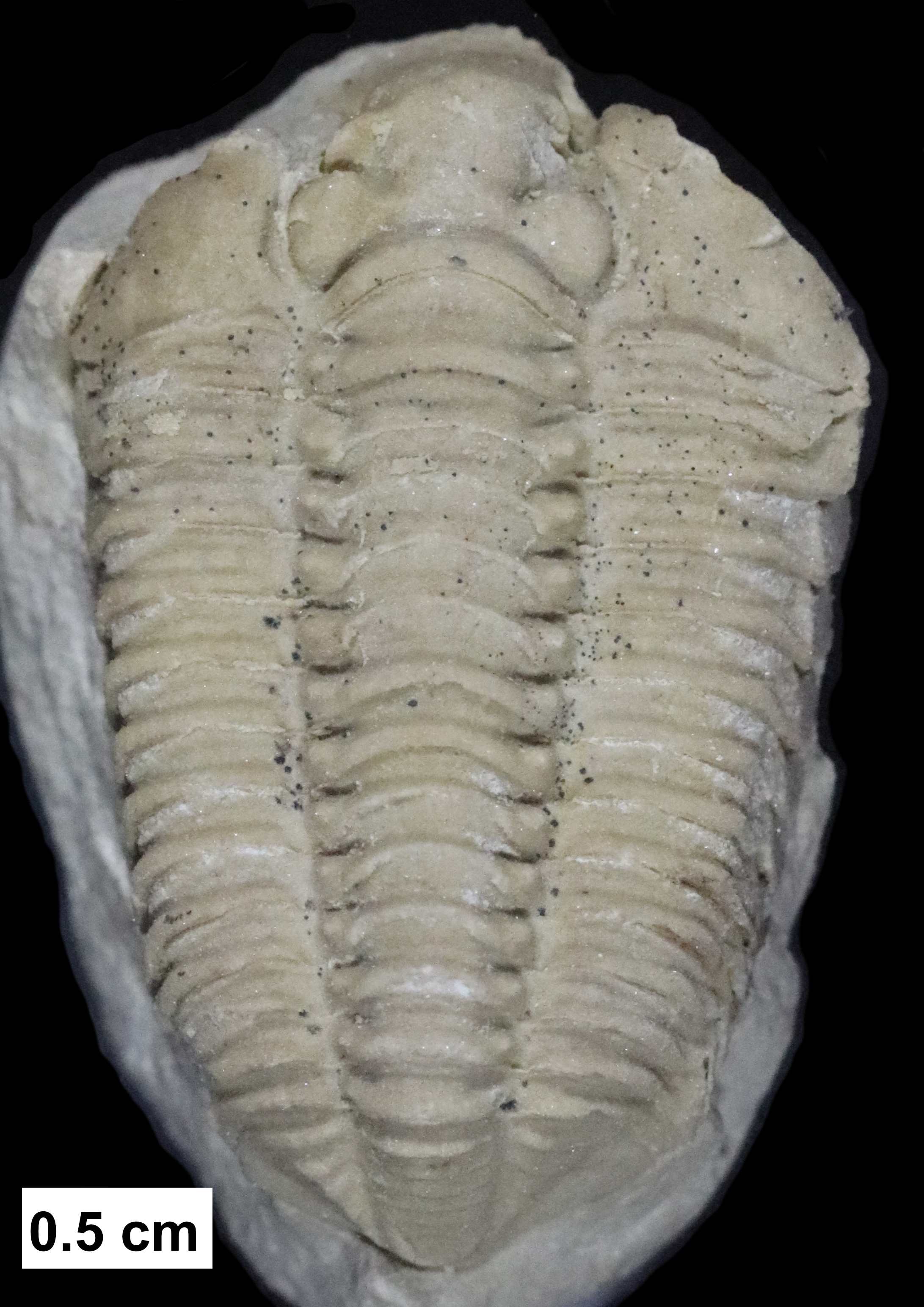
The Silurian trilobite Calymene celebra; Wisconsin's state fossil.

Polymath naturalist Increase Allen Lapham is regarded as Wisconsin's first geologist. During the late 1830s Lapham discovered a wide variety of fossils in great abundance in some rocky hills near Milwaukee. He wondered about the stratigraphic relationship between the rocks preserving his fossils and those from New York described in James Hall's recent research. Lapham sent a sizable sampling of the local fossils to Hall in 1846. Hall began researching the area and in 1862 recognized the local reefs for what they were. The Silurian-aged reefs of the Milwaukee area were the first Paleozoic reefs in the world to be described for the scientific literature. They were also the first fossil reefs in North America to be properly recognized as such. Hall set out to formally describe the fossils of the reef, and found them to be among the most diverse of the period on the entire continent. Lapham died in 1875 and most of his fossils and mineral specimens were sold to the University of Wisconsin. Sadly, most of his specimens were destroyed nine years later during a fire that consumed the university's science building. During the second half of the 19th century the region was prospected by "gentleman naturalists" who collected fossils on behalf of Hall and other well known paleontologists. Examples include T. A. Greene and E. E. Teller who collected near Milwaukee, P. R. Hoy, who collected near Racine, and F. H. Day, who collected in the Wauwatosa area. In 1877 research by T. C. Chamberlin uncovered differences in the composition and fossils of the reef-bearing rocks of the Milwaukee area as compared to those that didn't contain reefs. Donald G. Mikulic praised Chamberlin's research on the Milwaukee reefs as "a classic work of paleoecology and sedimentology". In the early 20th century the reefs commanded the research attention of figures like W. C. Alden, A. W. Grabau, and R. R. Schrock. Gradually scientific interest in the Silurian reefs of Milwaukee waned along with the decline in local quarrying.

Lapham, Greene, Teller, Day, and another gentleman naturalist, C. E. Monroe, also gathered extensive collections from the Devonian Milwaukee Formation. The majority of those fossils came from natural cement quarries that operated between 1876 and 1911 along the Milwaukee River in the area now occupied by Estabrook and Lincoln Parks. Greene and some of the others would pay the quarry workers for their fossil finds, resulting in large numbers of high quality fossils. These beds soon became well known for containing one of the most diverse Devonian fish faunas in the United States. Most of that material as well as that collected after closure of the quarries now resides in museums, such as the Thomas A. Greene Geological Museum, Milwaukee Public Museum, Weis Earth Science Museum, Field Museum of Natural History, National Museum of Natural History (Smithsonian), Museum of Comparative Zoology, and Buffalo Museum of Science. Much of that material has not been studied in depth for over one hundred years, but a preliminary study conducted in 2019 indicates that the Milwaukee Formation contains one of the richest and most diverse biotas in North America coming from a single formation of its age.

Other significant, more recent developments in Wisconsin paleontology include the discovery of the Waukesha Biota and Blackberry Hill, as discussed above.

The Silurian trilobite Calymene celebra was designated as Wisconsin's state fossil in 1985.

== People ==
- Roy Chapman Andrews was born in Beloit on January 26, 1884.
- Amadeus William Grabau was born in Cedarburg on January 9, 1870.
- Everett C. Olson was born in Waupaca on November 6, 1910.

== Natural history museums ==
- Cable Natural History Museum, Cable
- Milwaukee Public Museum, Milwaukee
- Thomas A. Greene Geological Museum, Milwaukee
- University of Wisconsin–Stevens Point Museum of Natural History, Stevens Point
- UW–Madison Geology Museum, Madison
- Weis Earth Science Museum, Menasha
- Dinosaur Discovery Museum, Kenosha

== See also ==
- Paleontology in Illinois
- Paleontology in Iowa
- Paleontology in Michigan
- Paleontology in Minnesota
