= Trace fossil =

Geological record of biological activity

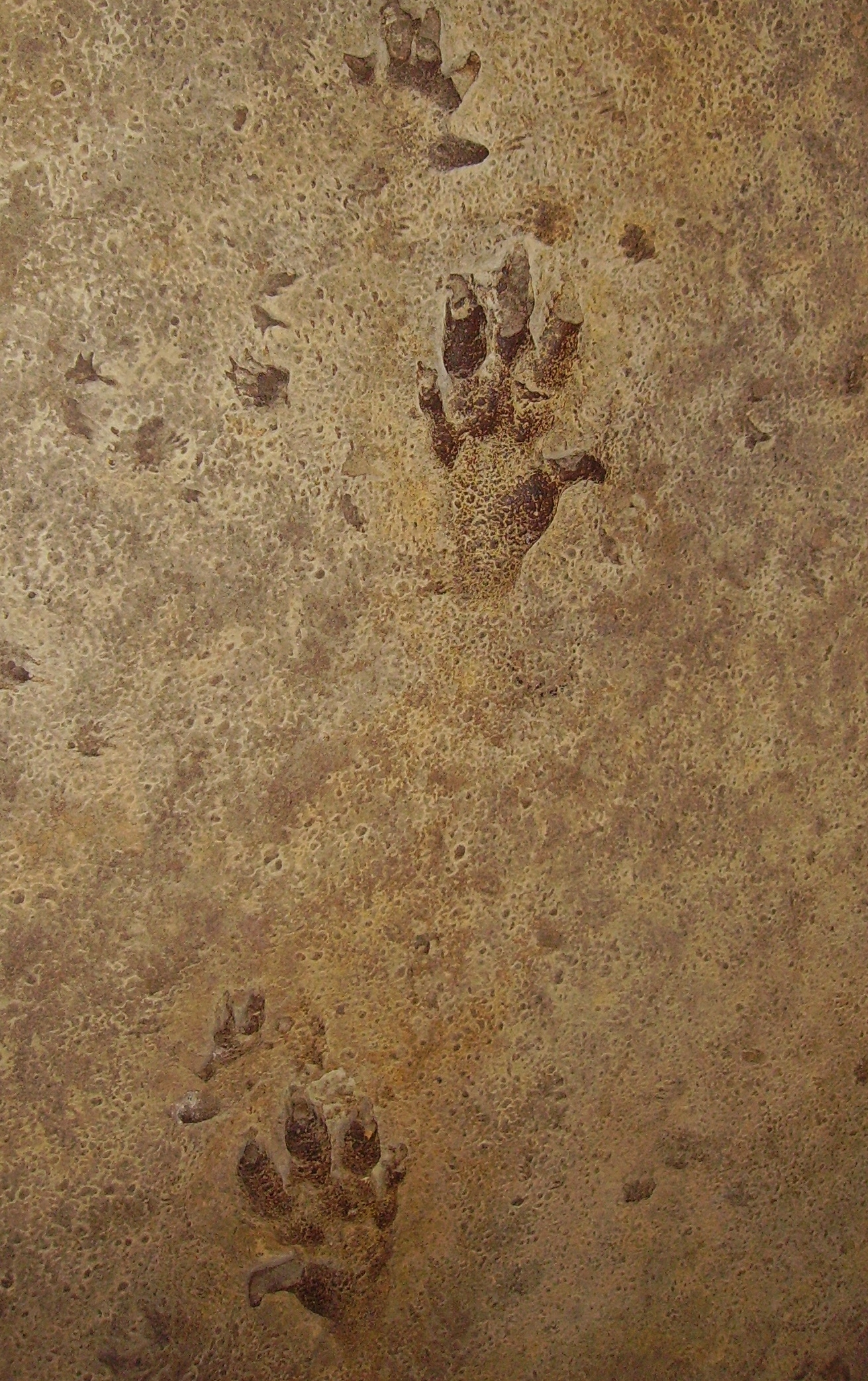
Chirotherium footprints in a Triassic sandstone

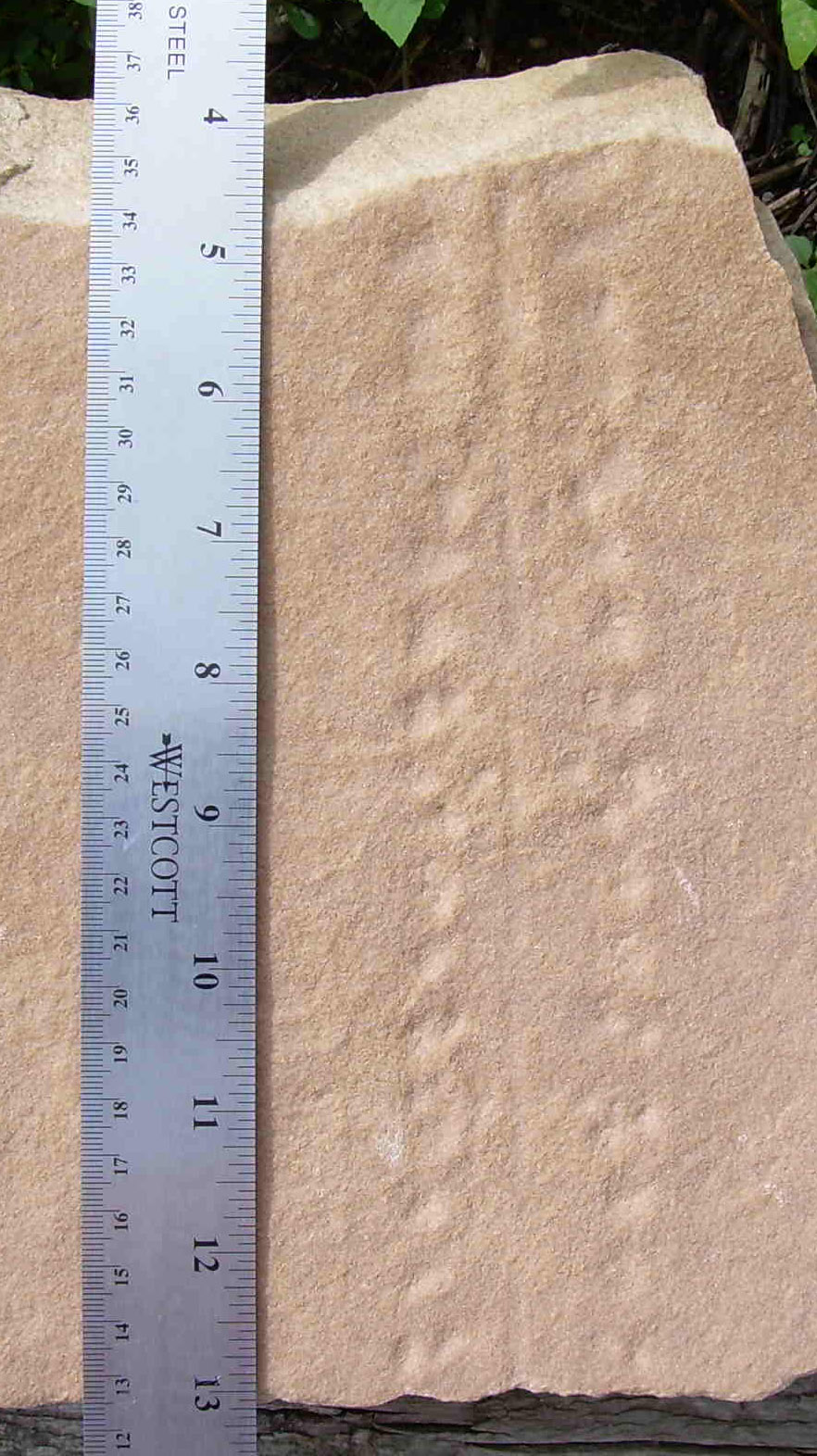
The trackway Protichnites from the Cambrian, Blackberry Hill, central Wisconsin

A trace fossil, also called an ichnofossil (/ˈɪknoʊˌfɒsɪl/; from Ancient Greek ἴχνος (íkhnos) 'trace, track'), is a fossil record of biological activity by lifeforms, but not the preserved remains of the organism itself. Trace fossils contrast with body fossils, which are the fossilized remains of parts of organisms' bodies, usually altered by later chemical activity or by mineralization. The study of such trace fossils is ichnology - the work of ichnologists.

Trace fossils may consist of physical impressions made on or in the substrate by an organism. For example, burrows, borings (bioerosion), urolites (erosion caused by evacuation of liquid wastes), footprints, feeding marks, and root cavities may all be trace fossils.

The term in its broadest sense also includes the remains of other organic material produced by an organism; for example coprolites (fossilized droppings) or chemical markers (sedimentological structures produced by biological means; for example, the formation of stromatolites). However, most sedimentary structures (for example those produced by empty shells rolling along the sea floor) are not produced through the behaviour of an organism and thus are not considered trace fossils.

The study of traces – ichnology – divides into paleoichnology, or the study of trace fossils, and neoichnology, the study of modern traces. Ichnological science offers many challenges, as most traces reflect the behaviour – not the biological affinity – of their makers. Accordingly, researchers classify trace fossils into form genera based on their appearance and on the implied behaviour, or ethology, of their makers.

== Occurrence ==
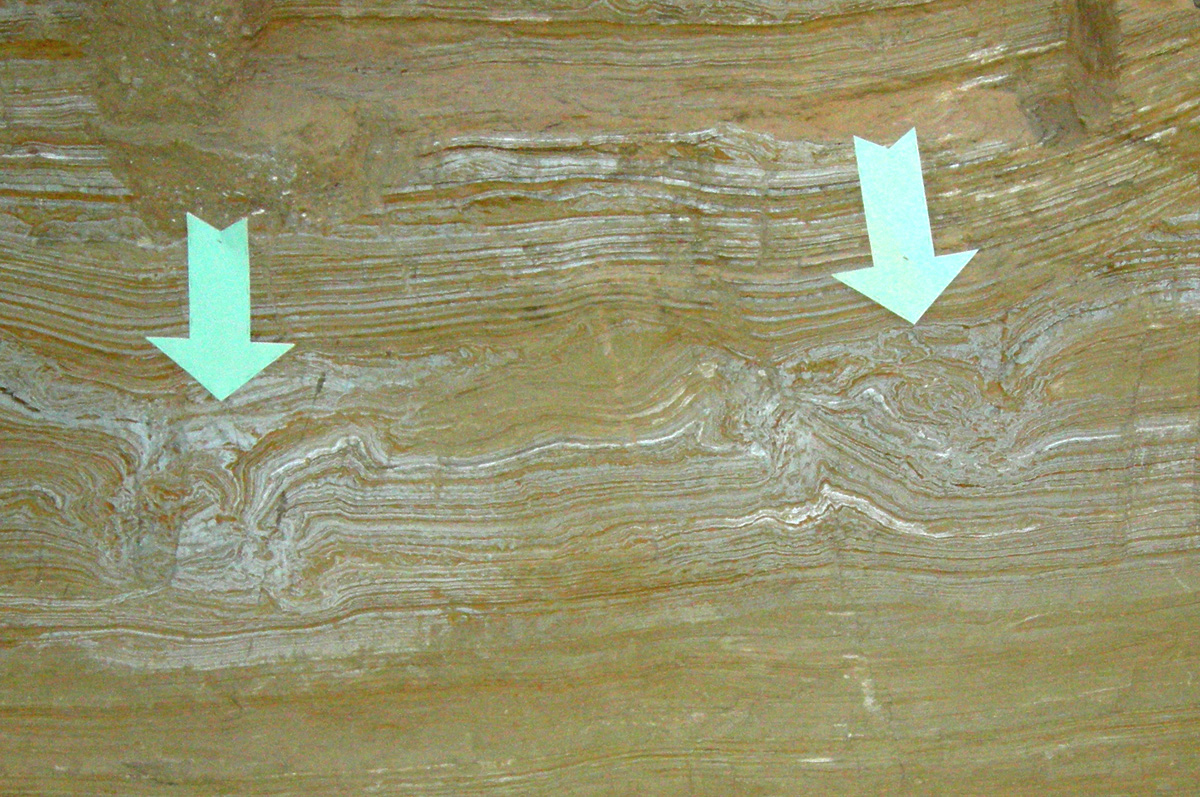
Cross-section of mammoth footprints at The Mammoth Site, Hot Springs, South Dakota

Traces are better known in their fossilized form than in modern sediments. This makes it difficult to interpret some fossils by comparing them with modern traces, even though they may be extant or even common. The main difficulties in accessing extant burrows stem from finding them in consolidated sediment, and being able to access those formed in deeper water.

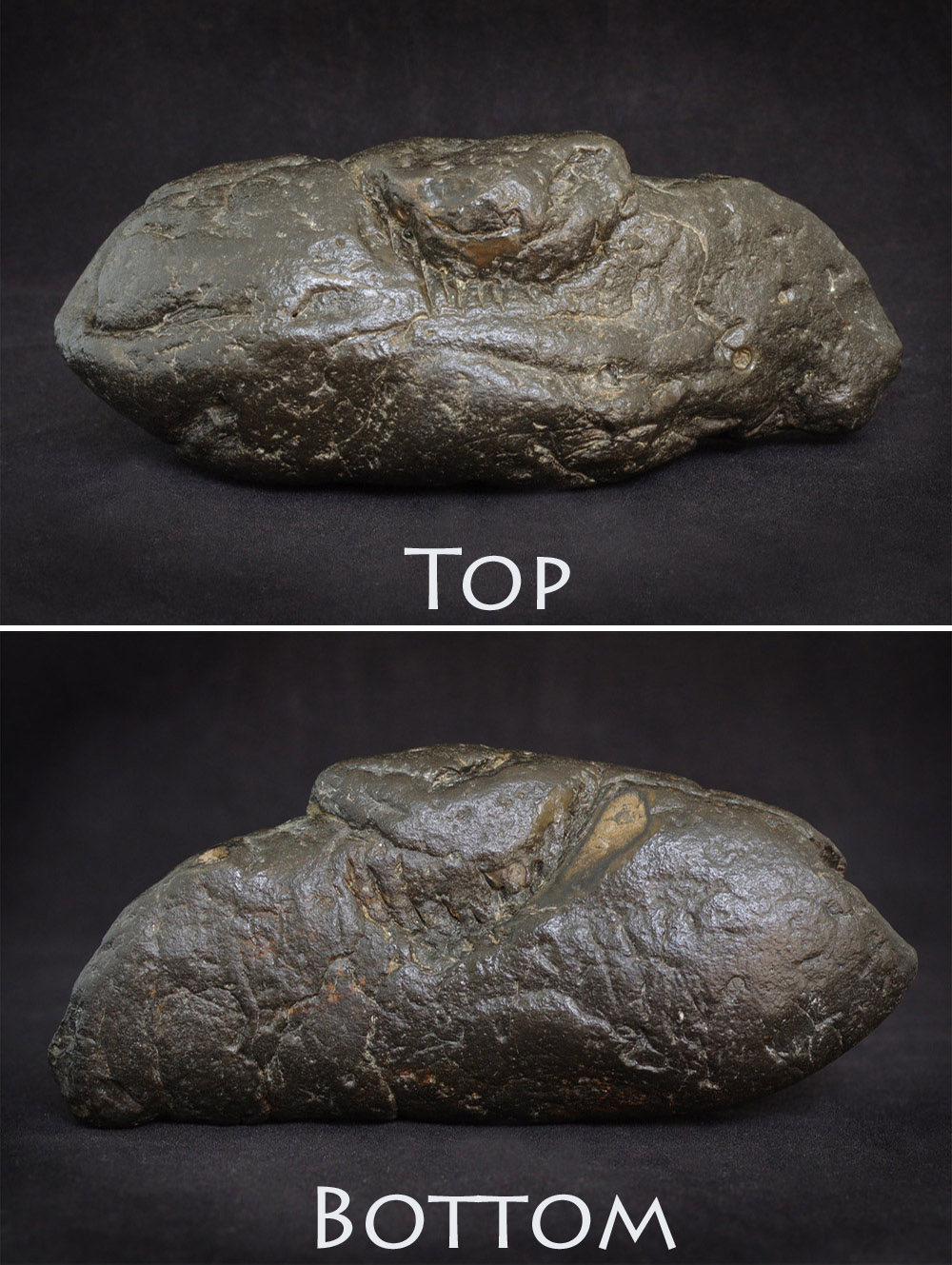
This coprolite shows distinct top and bottom jaw bite marks, possibly from a prehistoric gar fish. Discovery location: South Carolina, US; age: Miocene; dimensions: 144.6 mm × 63.41 mm (5.693 in × 2.496 in); weight: 558 g (1 lb 3.7 oz)

Trace fossils are best preserved in sandstones; the grain size and depositional facies both contributing to the better preservation. They may also be found in shales and limestones.

== Classification ==
Trace fossils are generally difficult or impossible to assign to a specific maker. Only in very rare occasions are the makers found in association with their tracks. Further, entirely different organisms may produce identical tracks. Therefore, conventional taxonomy is not applicable, and a comprehensive form of taxonomy has been erected. At the highest level of the classification, five behavioral modes are recognized:

- Domichnia, dwelling structures reflecting the life position of the organism that created it.
- Fodinichnia, three-dimensional structures left by animals which eat their way through sediment, such as deposit feeders;
- Pascichnia, feeding traces left by grazers on the surface of a soft sediment or a mineral substrate;
- Cubichnia, resting traces, in the form of an impression left by an organism on a soft sediment;
- Repichnia, surface traces of creeping and crawling.

Fossils are further classified into form genera, a few of which are even subdivided to a "species" level. Classification is based on shape, form, and implied behavioural mode.

To keep body and trace fossils nomenclatorially separate, ichnospecies are erected for trace fossils. Ichnotaxa are classified somewhat differently in zoological nomenclature than taxa based on body fossils (see trace fossil classification for more information). Examples include:

- Late Cambrian trace fossils from intertidal settings include Protichnites and Climactichnites, amongst others
- Mesozoic dinosaur footprints including ichnogenera such as Grallator, Atreipus, and Anomoepus
- Triassic to Recent termite mounds, which can encompass several square kilometers of sediment

== Information provided by ichnofossils ==
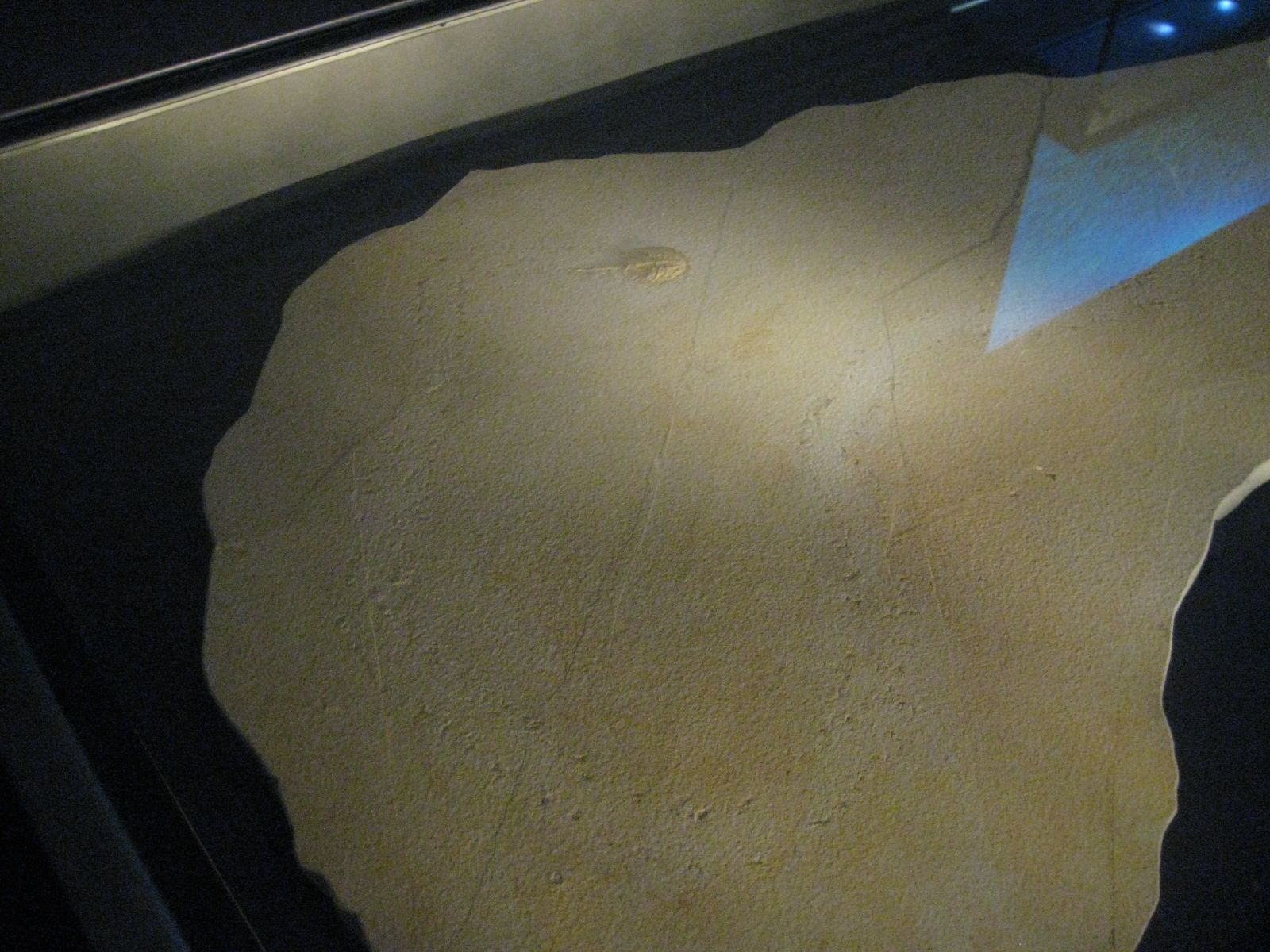
Mesolimulus walchi fossil and track, a rare example of tracks and the creature that made them fossilized together

Trace fossils are important paleoecological and paleoenvironmental indicators, because they are preserved in situ, or in the life position of the organism that made them. Because identical fossils can be created by a range of different organisms, trace fossils can only reliably inform us of two things: the consistency of the sediment at the time of its deposition, and the energy level of the depositional environment. Attempts to deduce such traits as whether a deposit is marine or non-marine have been made, but shown to be unreliable.

=== Paleobiology ===
Although one-to-one correspondence between trace fossils and their tracemakers is rarely preserved, trajectory-type trace fossils provide valuable information about the biology and behaviour of the organisms that produced them. Such information includes inferred behaviours (e.g., grazing, foraging, sediment probing, and escape responses, or stereotyped behaviour such as taxis or kinesis), the feeding habits of tracemakers, and the likely functions of particular burrow systems.

Quantitative analyses have further expanded the interpretive potential of trajectory-type trace fossils. Spectral characteristics derived from turning-angle series, such as dominant frequencies and bandwidths obtained through Fourier transform, as well as autocorrelation, have been shown to reflect organismal locomotory modes and may help constrain the taxonomic affinity of tracemakers to particular animal groups. In addition, trajectory smoothness analyses based on the continuity of trajectory derivatives have been proposed as proxies for body slenderness or aspect ratio, thereby providing insights into the body plan of the tracemaking organism, including the earliest bilaterians.

Additionally, biophysical modelling and dimensional analysis can be used to estimate the locomotory speeds of tracemakers. For example, Froude number scaling has been employed to relate locomotion speed to trackway dimensions and gait. Alexander (1976) demonstrated that the locomotory speeds of dinosaurs and other tetrapods could be estimated from track size through allometry relationships involving hip height.; Similar approaches have subsequently been applied to invertebrate trace fossils. Wang et al. (2024) used Froude number scaling to establish a relationship between the irregularity of furrow levees and locomotory speed, enabling quantitative estimates of the movement dynamics of the invertebrate tracemaking organisms. Such approaches demonstrate that trace fossils can preserve quantitative information on the biomechanics and locomotory performance of organisms through deep time, providing insights into palaeobiological traits that are otherwise difficult to infer from the body-fossil record alone.

=== Paleoecology ===
Trace fossils provide us with indirect evidence of life in the past, such as the footprints, tracks, burrows, borings, and feces left behind by animals, rather than the preserved remains of the body of the actual animal itself. Unlike most other fossils, which are produced only after the death of the organism concerned, trace fossils provide us with a record of the activity of an organism during its lifetime. Unlike body fossils, which can be transported far away from where an individual organism lived, trace fossils record the type of environment an animal actually inhabited and thus can provide a more accurate palaeoecological sample than body fossils.

Trace fossils are formed by organisms performing the functions of their everyday life, such as walking, crawling, burrowing, boring, or feeding. Tetrapod footprints, worm trails and the burrows made by clams and arthropods are all trace fossils.

Perhaps the most spectacular trace fossils are the huge, three-toed footprints produced by dinosaurs and related archosaurs. These imprints give scientists clues as to how these animals lived. Although the skeletons of dinosaurs can be reconstructed, only their fossilized footprints can determine exactly how they stood and walked. Such tracks can tell much about the gait of the animal which made them, what its stride was, and whether the front limbs touched the ground or not.

However, most trace fossils are rather less conspicuous, such as the trails made by segmented worms. Due to a lack of hard parts, body fossils of these soft-bodied animals are rare.

=== Palaeopathology ===
Ichnofossils can preserve evidence of pathologies in extinct organisms, particularly in cases where there is a large sample size of a given track type and abnormalities can easily be diagnosed in individual trackways.

=== Paleoenvironment ===
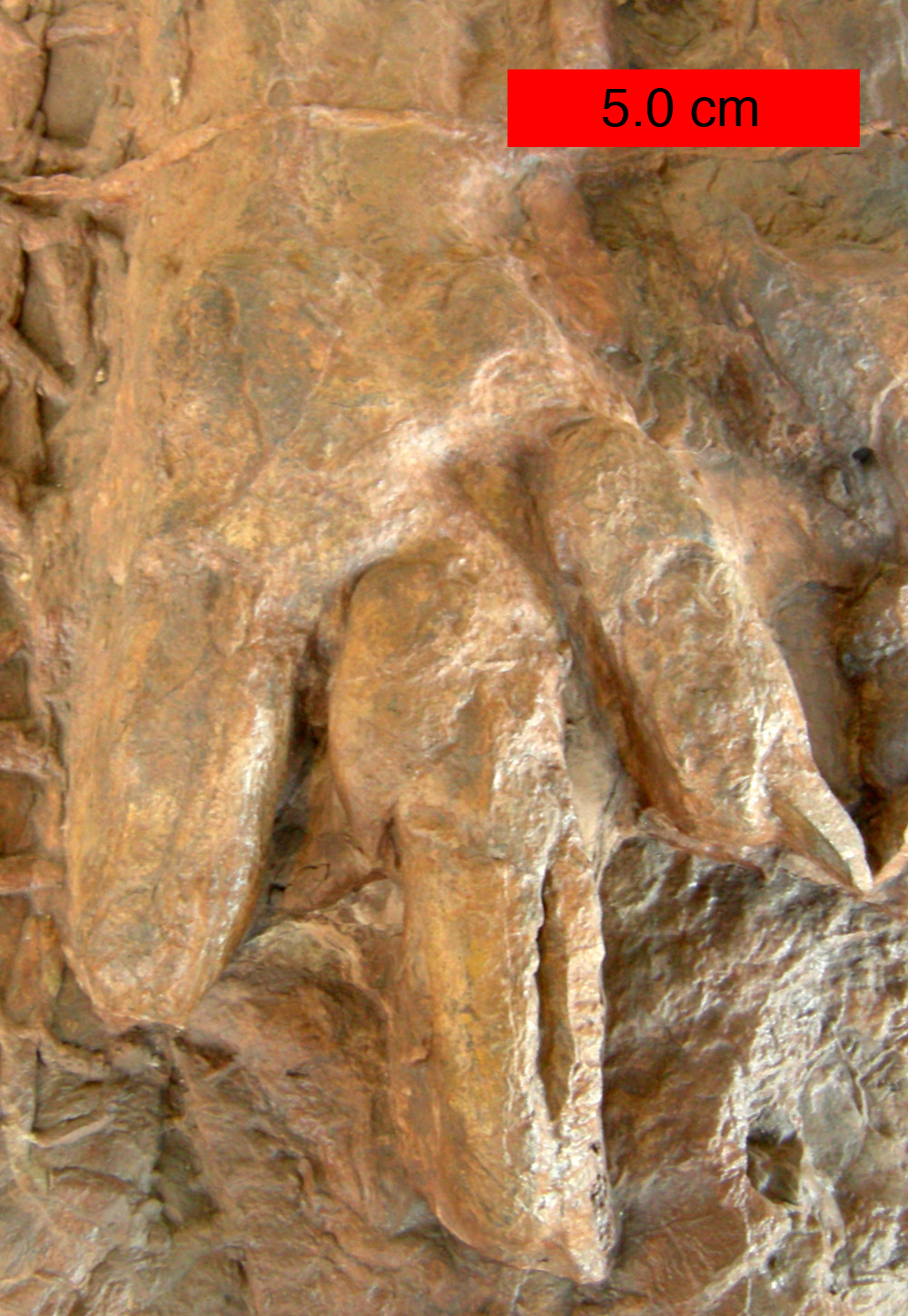
Eubrontes, a dinosaur footprint in the Lower Jurassic Moenave Formation at the St. George Dinosaur Discovery Site at Johnson Farm, southwestern Utah

Fossil footprints made by tetrapod vertebrates are difficult to identify to a particular species of animal, but they can provide valuable information such as the speed, weight, and behavior of the organism that made them. Such trace fossils are formed when amphibians, reptiles, mammals, or birds walked across soft (probably wet) mud or sand which later hardened sufficiently to retain the impressions before the next layer of sediment was deposited. Some fossils can even provide details of how wet the sand was when they were being produced, and hence allow estimation of paleo-wind directions.

Assemblages of trace fossils occur at certain water depths, and can also reflect the salinity and turbidity of the water column.

=== Stratigraphic correlation ===
Some trace fossils can be used as local index fossils, to date the rocks in which they are found, such as the burrow Arenicolites franconicus which occurs only in a 4 cm (1 1/2 in) layer of the Triassic Muschelkalk epoch, throughout wide areas in southern Germany.

The base of the Cambrian period is defined by the first appearance of the trace fossil Treptichnus pedum.

Trace fossils have a further utility, as many appear before the organism thought to create them, extending their stratigraphic range.

== Ichnofacies ==
Ichnofacies are assemblages of individual trace fossils that occur repeatedly in time and space. Palaeontologist Adolf Seilacher pioneered the concept of ichnofacies, whereby geologists infer the state of a sedimentary system at its time of deposition by noting the fossils in association with one another. The principal ichnofacies recognized in the literature are Skolithos, Cruziana, Zoophycos, Nereites, Glossifungites, Scoyenia, Trypanites, Teredolites, and Psilonichus. These assemblages are not random. In fact, the assortment of fossils preserved are primarily constrained by the environmental conditions in which the trace-making organisms dwelt. Water depth, salinity, hardness of the substrate, dissolved oxygen, and many other environmental conditions control which organisms can inhabit particular areas. Therefore, by documenting and researching changes in ichnofacies, scientists can interpret changes in environment. For example, ichnological studies have been utilized across mass extinction boundaries, such as the Cretaceous–Paleogene mass extinction, to aid in understanding environmental factors involved in mass extinction events.

== Inherent bias ==
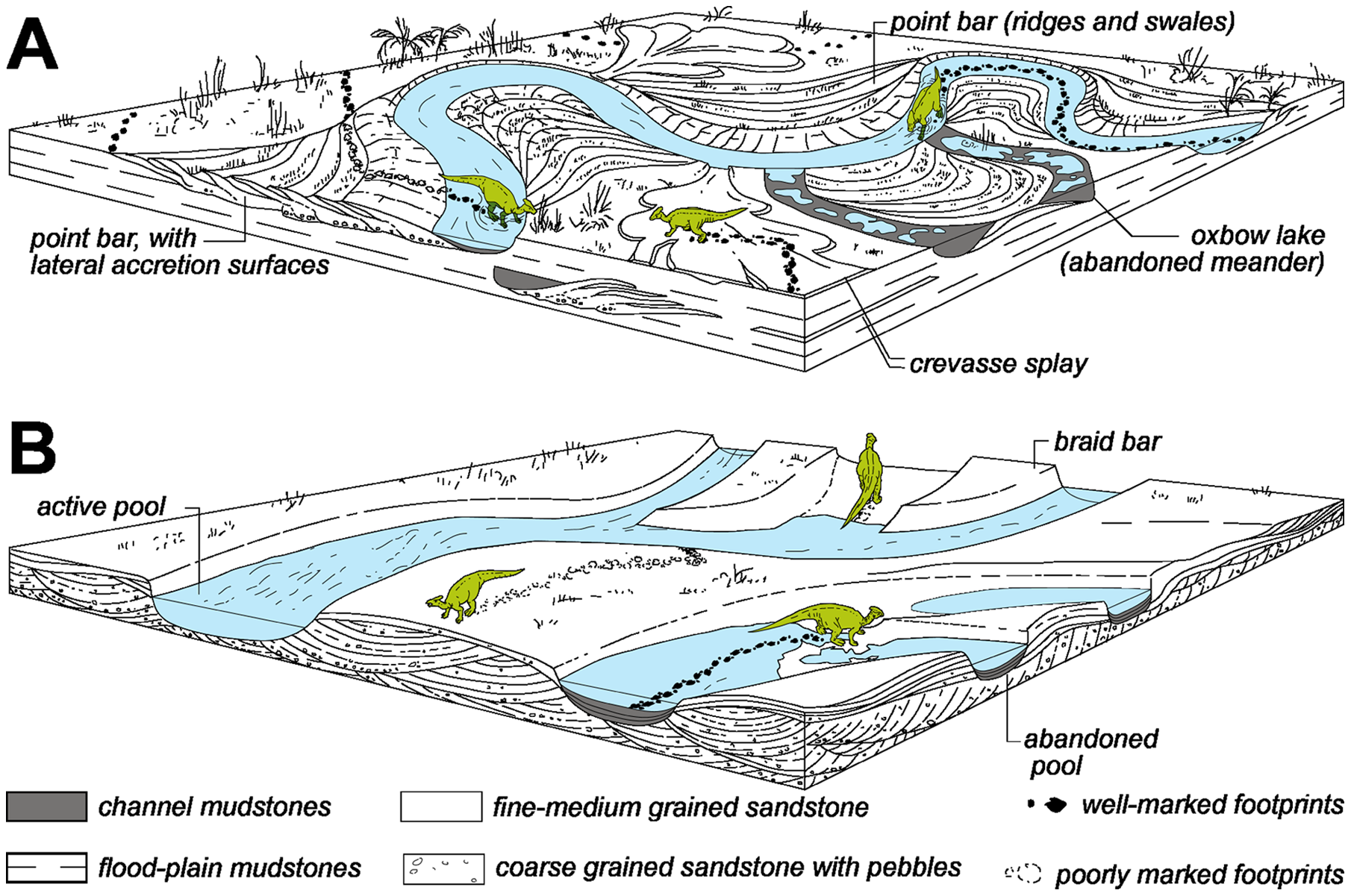
Diagram showing how dinosaur footprints are preserved in different deposits

Most trace fossils are known from marine deposits. Essentially, there are two types of traces, either exogenic ones, which are made on the surface of the sediment (such as tracks) or endogenic ones, which are made within the layers of sediment (such as burrows).

Surface trails on sediment in shallow marine environments stand less chance of fossilization because they are subjected to wave and current action. Conditions in quiet, deep-water environments tend to be more favorable for preserving fine trace structures.

== Evolution ==
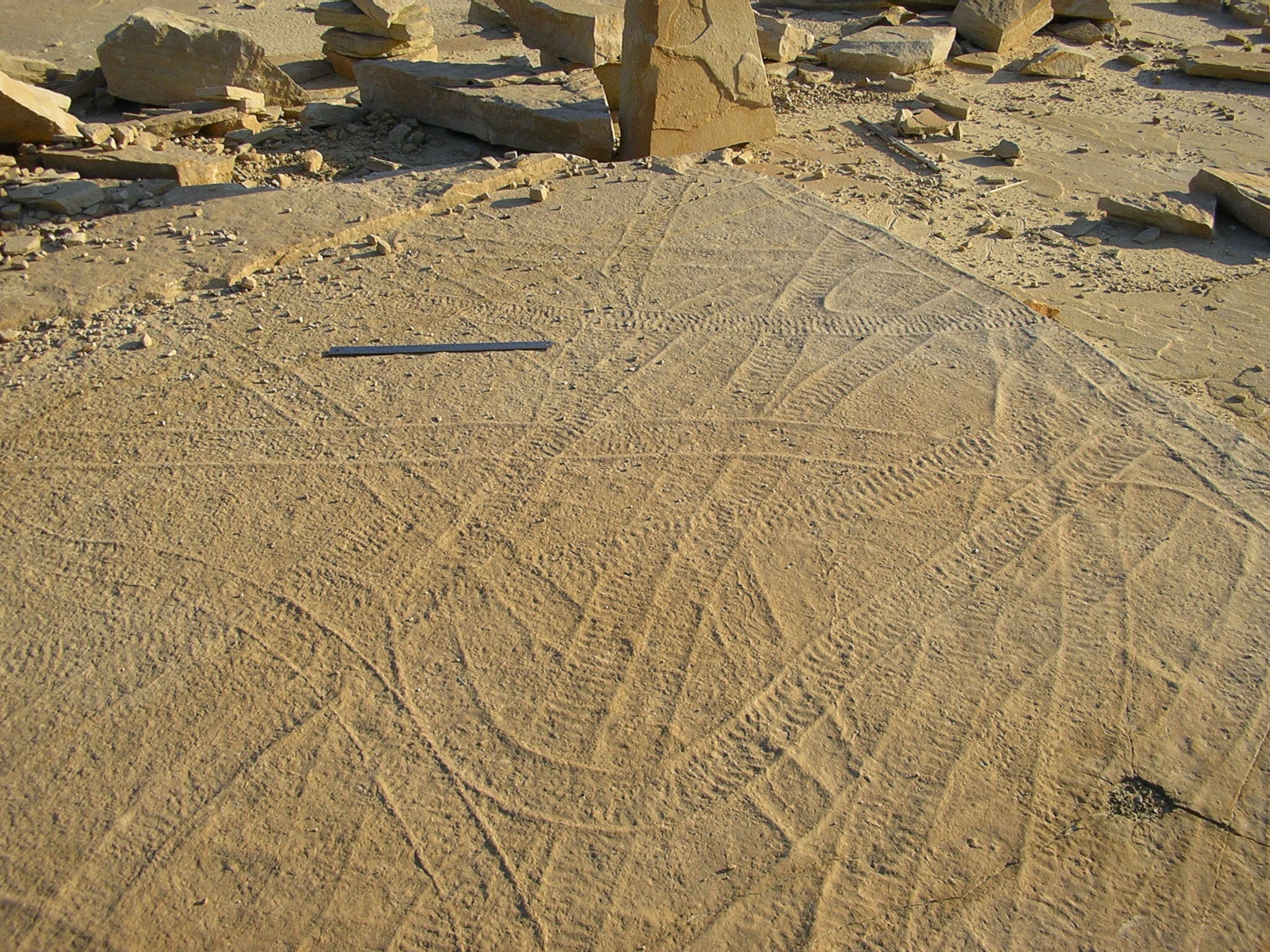
Climactichnites wilsoni, probably trails from a slug-like animal, from the Cambrian, Blackberry Hill, central Wisconsin. The ruler in the background is 45 cm (18 in) long.

The earliest complex trace fossils, not including microbial traces such as stromatolites, date to 2,000 to 1,800 million years ago. This is far too early for them to have an animal origin, and they are thought to have been formed by amoebae. Putative "burrows" dating as far back as 1,100 million years may have been made by animals which fed on the undersides of microbial mats, which would have shielded them from a chemically unpleasant ocean; however their uneven width and tapering ends make a biological origin so difficult to defend that even the original author no longer believes they are authentic.

The first evidence of burrowing which is widely accepted dates to the Ediacaran (Vendian) period, around 567.3 million years ago, from lower Blueflower Formation. During this period the traces and burrows basically are horizontal on or just below the seafloor surface. Such traces must have been made by motile organisms, which would probably have been bilateran animals. The traces observed imply simple behaviour such as random walks, and point to organisms feeding above the surface and burrowing for protection from predators. Contrary to widely circulated opinion that Ediacaran burrows are only horizontal the vertical burrows Skolithos are also known. The producers of burrows Skolithos declinatus from the Vendian (Ediacaran) beds in Russia with date 555.3 million years ago have not been identified; they might have been filter feeders subsisting on the nutrients from the suspension. The density of these burrows is up to 245 burrows/dm^{2}. Some Ediacaran trace fossils have been found directly associated with body fossils. Yorgia and Dickinsonia are often found at the end of long pathways of trace fossils matching their shape. The feeding was performed in a mechanical way, supposedly the ventral side of body these organisms was covered with cilia. The potential mollusc related Kimberella is associated with scratch marks, perhaps formed by a radula, further traces from 555 million years ago appear to imply active crawling or burrowing activity.

Body fossils of motile organisms from the Ediacaran–Cambrian transition are relatively rare, whereas trace fossils provide important evidence for changes in body morphology and behaviour during this interval. Quantitative analyses of trace fossils suggest an increase in body aspect ratio, from ovoid forms to more elongated body plans, with body lengths exceeding eight times body width by the terminal Ediacaran. This trend is accompanied by increased trajectory smoothness in trace fossils. These morphological and behavioural changes have been interpreted as consistent with increasing cephalization, reduced locomotory drag, and enhanced locomotory stability among the trace-making organisms. Terminal Ediacaran tracemakers also exhibited the ability to produce tightly looping and space-filling trajectories, such as those preserved in Parapsammichnites. Persistent homology analyses of these trace-fossil patterns have been interpreted as evidence for expanded sensory capabilities, with inferred perceptual ranges extending to the decimetre scale. Such sensory ranges have been argued to be compatible with light-sensing abilities when compared with sensory scaling relationships in modern marine organisms. These observations have been cited as evidence that some behavioural and sensory innovations commonly associated with the Cambrian Information Revolution may have originated during the terminal Ediacaran.

As the Cambrian got underway, new forms of trace fossil appeared, including vertical burrows (e.g. Diplocraterion) and traces normally attributed to arthropods. These represent a "widening of the behavioural repertoire", both in terms of abundance and complexity.

Trace fossils are a particularly significant source of data from this period because they represent a data source that is not directly connected to the presence of easily fossilized hard parts, which are rare during the Cambrian. Whilst exact assignment of trace fossils to their makers is difficult, the trace fossil record seems to indicate that at the very least, large, bottom-dwelling, bilaterally symmetrical organisms were rapidly diversifying during the early Cambrian.

Further, less rapid diversification occurred since, and many traces have been converged upon independently by unrelated groups of organisms.

Trace fossils also provide our earliest evidence of animal life on land. Evidence of the first animals that appear to have been fully terrestrial dates to the Cambro-Ordovician and is in the form of trackways. Trackways from the Ordovician Tumblagooda sandstone allow the behaviour of other terrestrial organisms to be determined. The trackway Protichnites represents traces from an amphibious or terrestrial arthropod going back to the Cambrian.

== Common ichnogenera ==
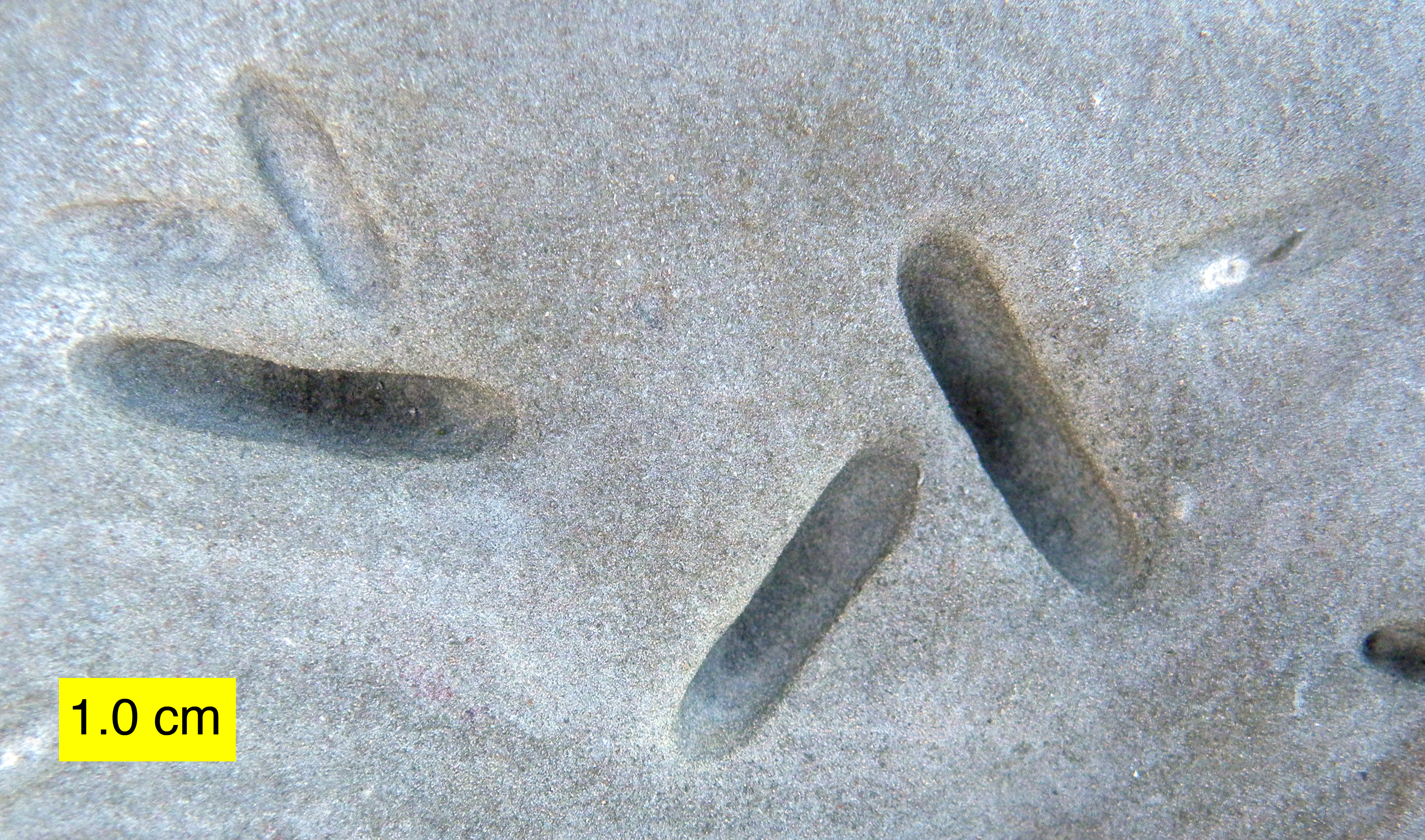
Petroxestes borings in a hardground from the Upper Ordovician of southern Ohio

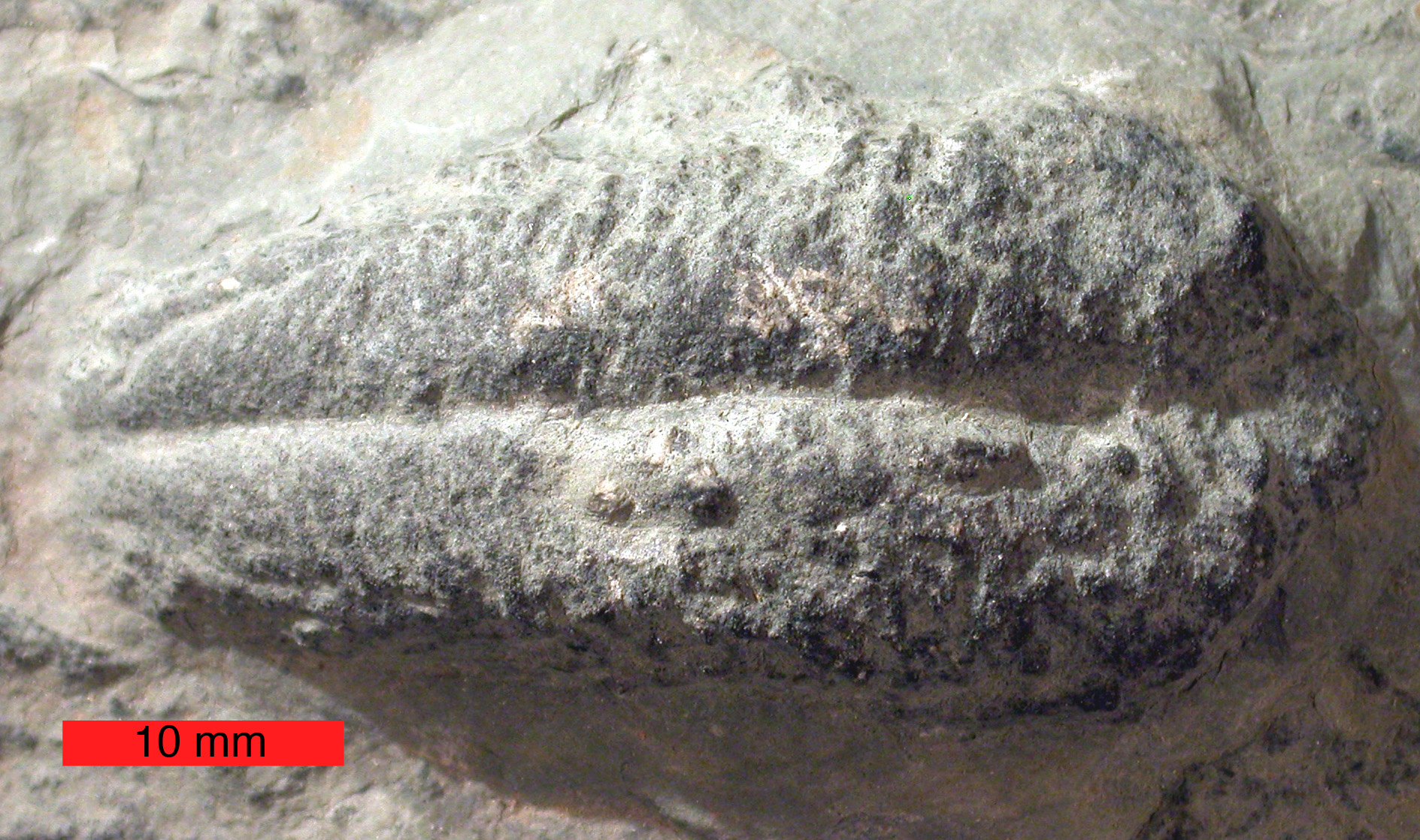
Rusophycus trace fossil from the Ordovician of southern Ohio. Scale bar is 10 mm.

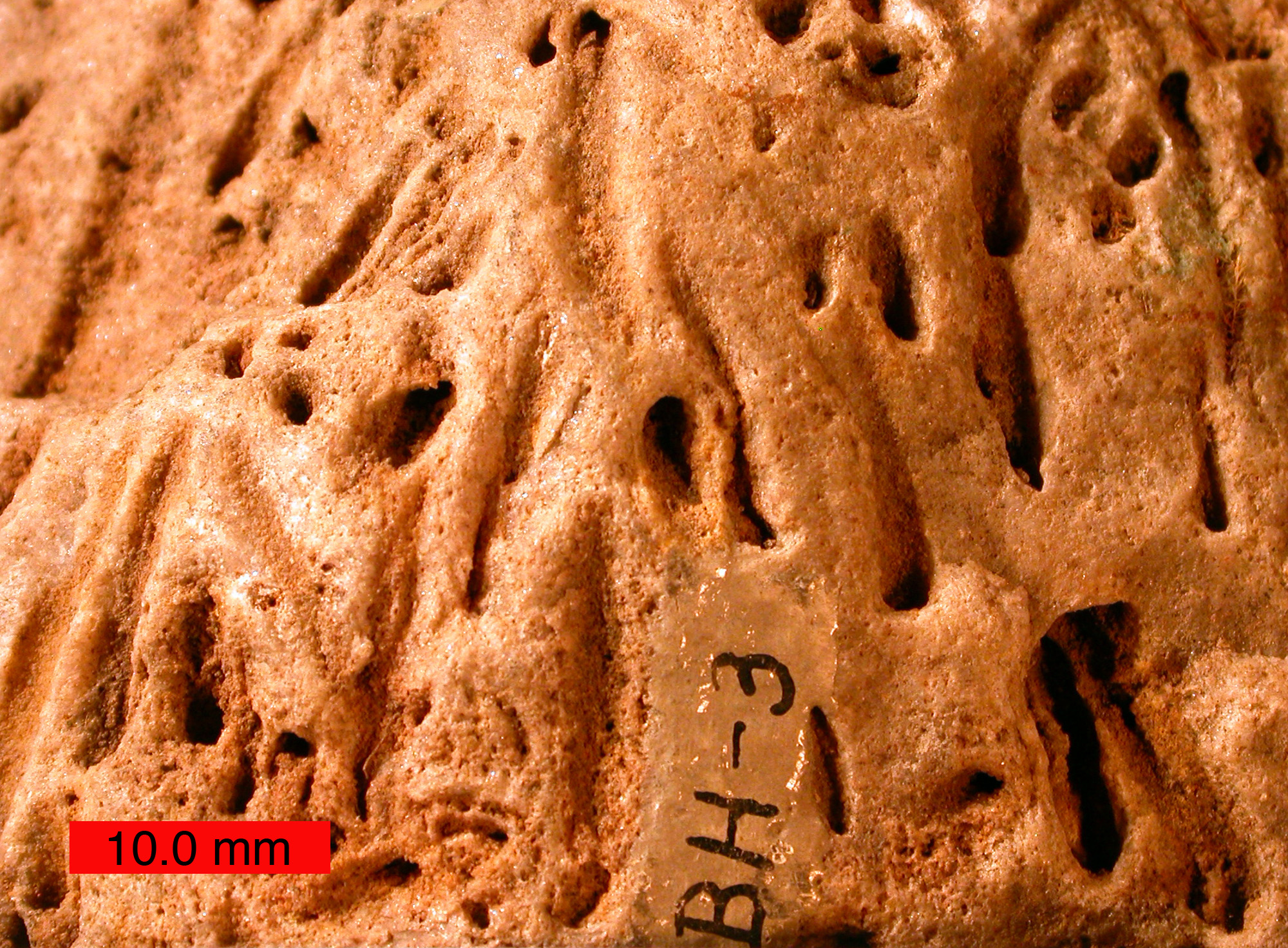
Skolithos trace fossil. Scale bar is 10 mm.

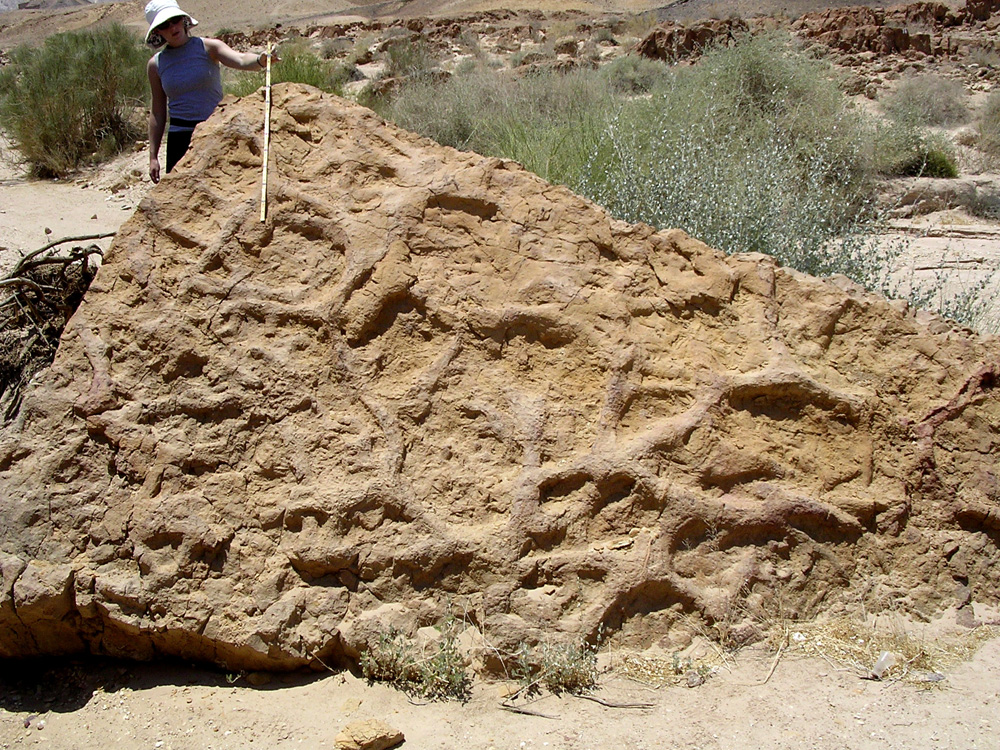
Thalassinoides, burrows produced by crustaceans, from the Middle Jurassic, Makhtesh Qatan, southern Israel

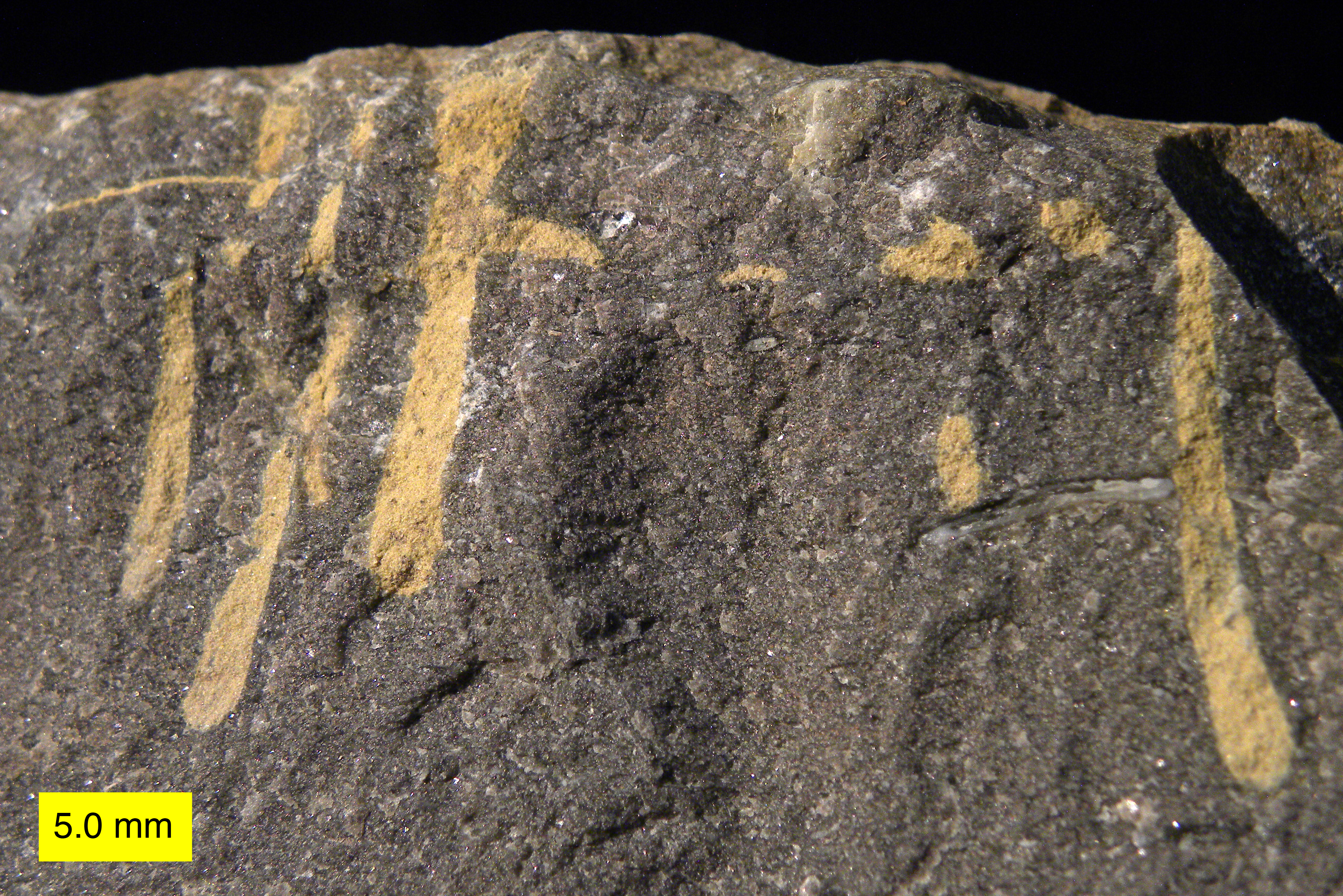
Trypanites borings in an Upper Ordovician hardground from northern Kentucky. The borings are filled with diagenetic dolomite (yellowish). The boring on the far right cuts through a shell in the matrix.

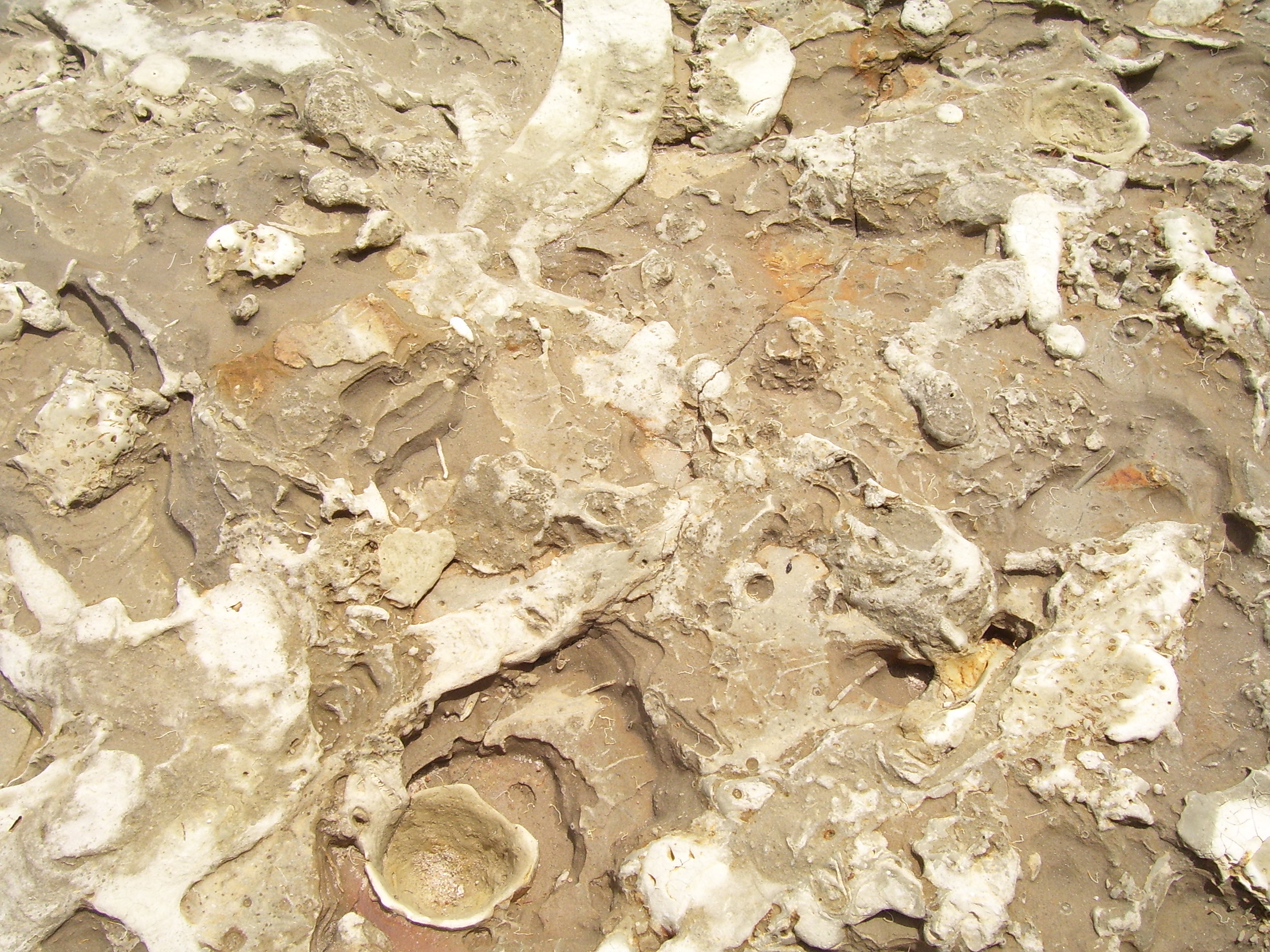
Ophiomorpha and Thalassinoides trace fossils produced by crustaceans found at Camacho formation from the Late Miocene in Colonia Department, Uruguay

- Anoigmaichnus is a bioclaustration. It occurs in the Ordovician bryozoans. Apertures of Anoigmaichnus are elevated above their hosts' growth surfaces, forming short chimney-like structures.
- Arachnostega is the name given to the irregular, branching burrows in the sediment fill of shells. They are visible on the surface of steinkerns. Their traces are known from the Cambrian period onwards.
- Asteriacites is the name given to the five-rayed fossils found in rocks and they record the resting place of starfish on the sea floor. Asteriacites are found in European and American rocks, from the Ordovician period onwards, and are numerous in rocks from the Jurassic period of Germany.
- Burrinjuckia is a bioclaustration. Burrinjuckia includes outgrowths of the brachiopod's secondary shell with a hollow interior in the mantle cavity of a brachiopod.
- Chondrites (not to be confused with stony meteorites of the same name) are small branching burrows of the same diameter, which superficially resemble the roots of a plant. The most likely candidate for having constructed these burrows is a nematode (roundworm). Chondrites are found in marine sediments from the Cambrian period of the Paleozoic onwards. They are especially common in sediments which were deposited in reduced-oxygen environments.
- Climactichnites is the name given to surface trails and burrows that consist of a series of chevron-shaped raised cross bars that are usually flanked on either side by a parallel ridge. They somewhat resemble tire tracks, and are larger (typically about 10 cm or 4 in wide) than most of the other trace fossils made by invertebrates. The trails were produced on sandy tidal flats during Cambrian time. While the identity of the animal is still conjectural, it may have been a large slug-like animal – its trails produced as it crawled over and processed the wet sand to obtain food.
- Cruziana are excavation trace marks made on the sea floor which have a two-lobed structure with a central groove. The lobes are covered with scratch marks made by the legs of the excavating organism, usually a trilobite or allied arthropod. Cruziana are most common in marine sediments formed during the Paleozoic era, particularly in rocks from the Cambrian and Ordovician periods. Over 30 ichnospecies of Cruziana have been identified. See also Isopodichnus.
- Entobia is a boring produced by endolithic clionaid sponges consisting of galleries excavated in a carbonate substrate; often has swollen chambers with connecting canals.
- Gastrochaenolites are clavate (club-shaped) borings also produced in calcareous hard substrates, usually by bivalves.
- Oikobesalon is an unbranched, elongate burrow with single-entrance and circular cross-section produced by terebellid polychaetes. They are covered with thin lining which has a transverse ornamentation in the form of fusiform annulation.
- Petroxestes is a shallow groove boring produced by mytilacean bivalves in carbonate hard substrates.
- Planolites is a small, 1-5mm (0.039–0.197 in), unlined and rarely branched, elongate burrow with fill that differs from the host rock, and is found throughout the Ediacaran and the Phanerozoic.
- Protichnites consists of two rows of tracks and a linear depression between the two rows. The tracks are believed to have been made by the walking appendages of arthropods. The linear depression is thought to be the result of a dragging tail. The structures bearing this name were typically made on the tidal flats of Paleozoic seas, but similar ones extend into the Cenozoic.
- Rhizocorallium is a type of burrow, the inclination of which is typically within 10° of the bedding planes of the sediment. These burrows can be very large, over a meter long in sediments that show good preservation, e.g. Jurassic rocks of the Yorkshire Coast (eastern United Kingdom), but the width is usually only up to 2 centimetres (3/4 in), restricted by the size of the organisms producing it. It is thought that they represent fodinichnia as the animal (probably a nematode) scoured the sediment for food.
- Rogerella is a small pouch-shaped boring with a slit-like aperture currently produced by acrothoracican barnacles.
- Rusophycus are bilobed "resting traces" associated with trilobites and other arthropods such as horseshoe crabs.
- Skolithos: One well-known occurrence of Cambrian trace fossils from this period is the famous 'Pipe Rock' of northwest Scotland. The 'pipes' that give the rock its name are closely packed straight tubes- which were presumably made by some kind of worm-like organism. The name given to this type of tube or burrow is Skolithos, which may be 30 cm (12 in) in length and between 2 and 4 cm (3/4 and 1 1/2 in) in diameter. Such traces are known worldwide from sands and sandstones deposited in shallow water environments, from the Cambrian period (542–488 Ma) onwards.
- Thalassinoides are burrows which occur parallel to the bedding plane of the rock and are extremely abundant in rocks, worldwide, from the Jurassic period onwards. They are repeatedly branched, with a slight swelling present at the junctions of the tubes. The burrows are cylindrical and vary from 2 to 5 cm (3/4 to 2 in) in diameter. Thalassinoides sometimes contain scratch marks, droppings or the bodily remains of the crustaceans which made them.
- Teichichnus has a distinctive form produced by the stacking of thin 'tongues' of sediment, atop one another. They are again believed to be fodinichnia, with the organism adopting the habit of retracing the same route through varying heights of the sediment, which would allow it to avoid going over the same area. These 'tongues' are often quite sinuous, reflecting perhaps a more nutrient-poor environment in which the feeding animals had to cover a greater area of sediment, in order to acquire sufficient nourishment.
- Tremichnus is an embedment structure (i.e. bioclaustration) formed by an organism that inhibited growth of the crinoid host stereom.
- Trypanites are elongated cylindrical borings in calcareous substrates such as shells, carbonate hardgrounds, and limestones. Usually produced by worms of various types and sipunculids.

== Other notable trace fossils ==
Less ambiguous than the above ichnogenera, are the traces left behind by invertebrates such as Hibbertopterus, a giant "sea scorpion" or eurypterid of the early Paleozoic era. This marine arthropod produced a spectacular track preserved in Scotland.

Bioerosion through time has produced a magnificent record of borings, gnawings, scratchings and scrapings on hard substrates. These trace fossils are usually divided into macroborings and microborings. Bioerosion intensity and diversity is punctuated by two events. One is called the Ordovician Bioerosion Revolution (see Wilson & Palmer, 2006) and the other was in the Jurassic. For a comprehensive bibliography of the bioerosion literature, please see the External links below.

The oldest types of tetrapod tail-and-footprints date back to the latter Devonian period. These vertebrate impressions have been found in Ireland, Scotland, Pennsylvania, and Australia. A sandstone slab containing the track of tetrapod, dated to 400 million years, is amongst the oldest evidence of a vertebrate walking on land.

Important human trace fossils are the Laetoli (Tanzania) footprints, imprinted in volcanic ash 3.7 Ma (million years ago) – probably by an early Australopithecus.

== Confusion with other types of fossils ==
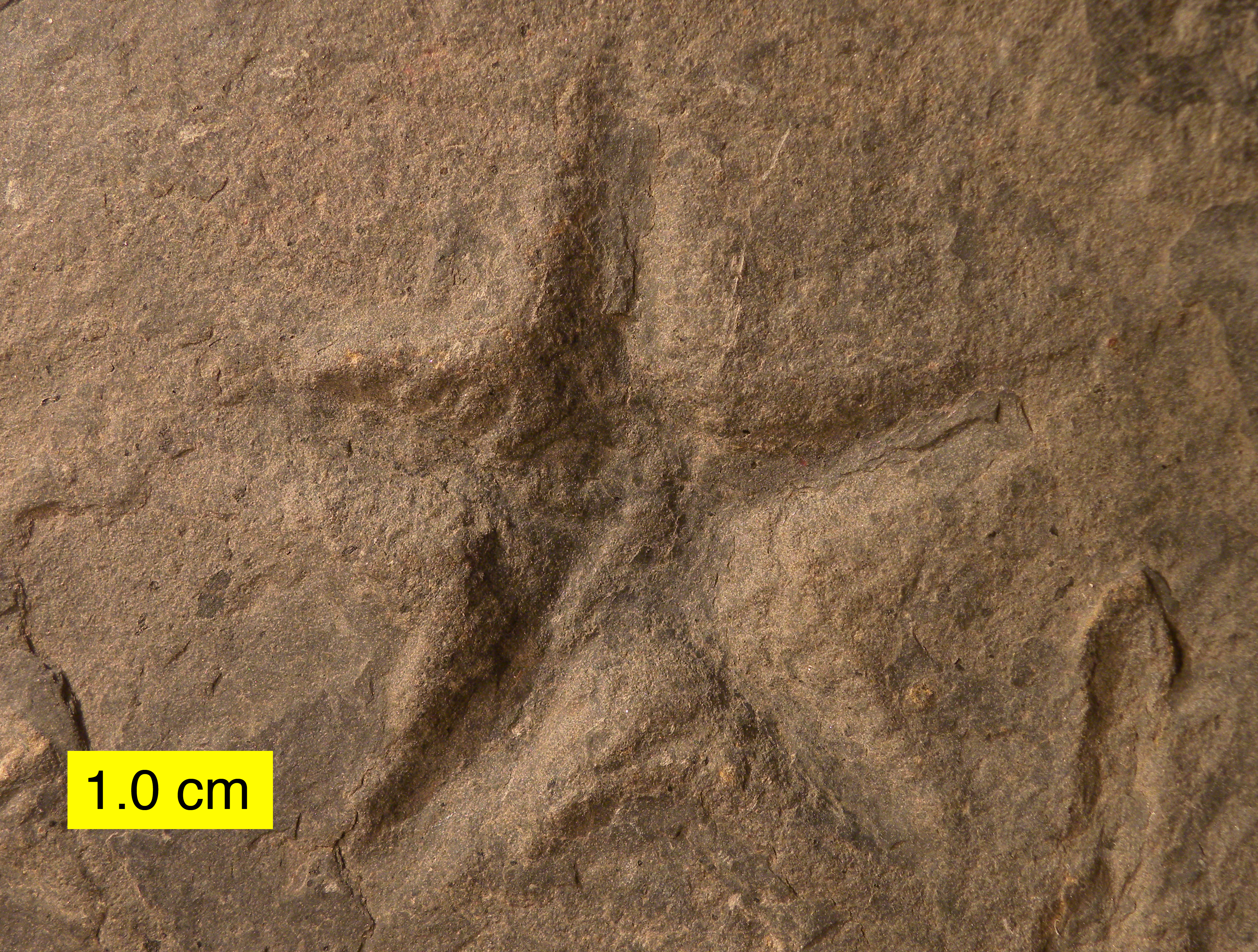
Asteriacites (sea star trace fossil) from the Devonian of northeastern Ohio. It appears at first to be an external mold of the body, but the sediment piled between the rays shows that it is a burrow.

Trace fossils are not body casts. The Ediacara biota, for instance, primarily comprises the casts of organisms in sediment. Similarly, a footprint is not a simple replica of the sole of the foot, and the resting trace of a seastar has different details than an impression of a seastar.

Early paleobotanists misidentified a wide variety of structures they found on the bedding planes of sedimentary rocks as fucoids (Fucales, a kind of brown algae or seaweed). However, even during the earliest decades of the study of ichnology, some fossils were recognized as animal footprints and burrows. Studies in the 1880s by A. G. Nathorst and Joseph F. James comparing 'fucoids' to modern traces made it increasingly clear that most of the specimens identified as fossil fucoids were animal trails and burrows. True fossil fucoids are quite rare.

Pseudofossils, which are not true fossils, should also not be confused with ichnofossils, which are true indications of prehistoric life.

== Gallery of trace fossils ==
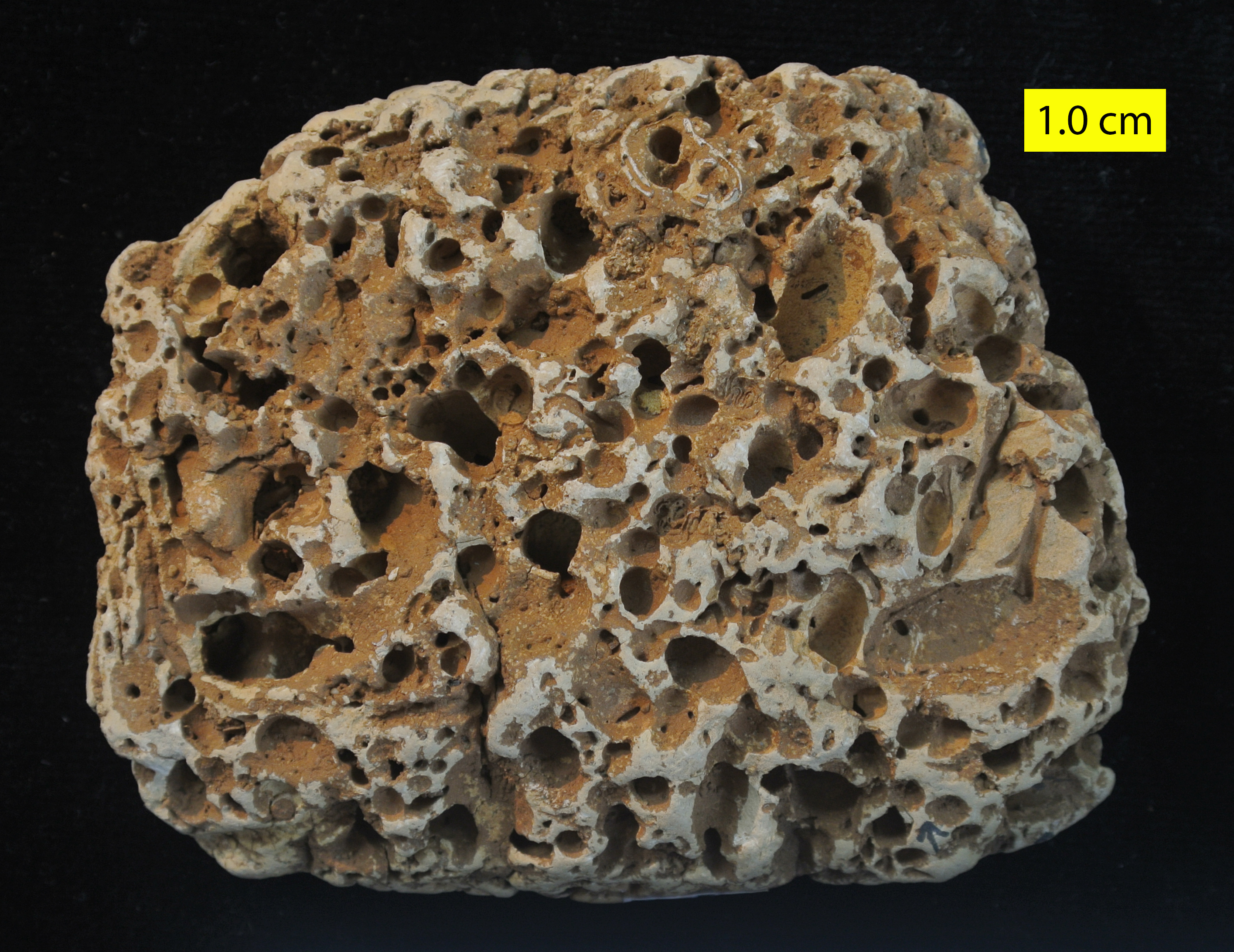
Numerous borings in a Cretaceous cobble, Faringdon, England; see Wilson (1986)

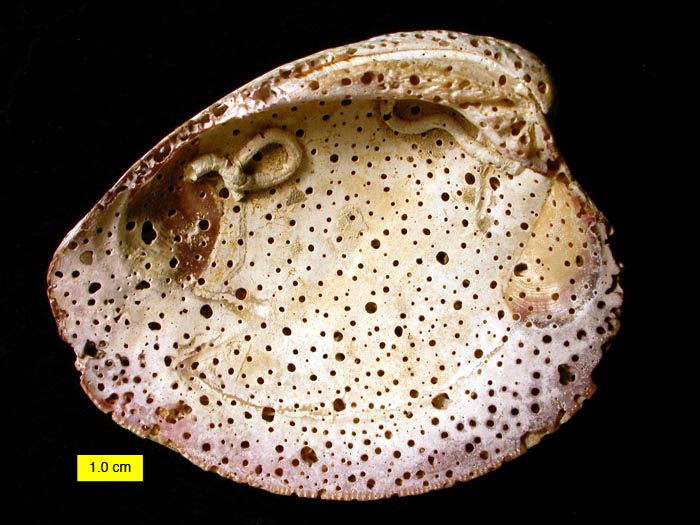
Sponge borings (Entobia) and encrusters on a modern bivalve shell, North Carolina

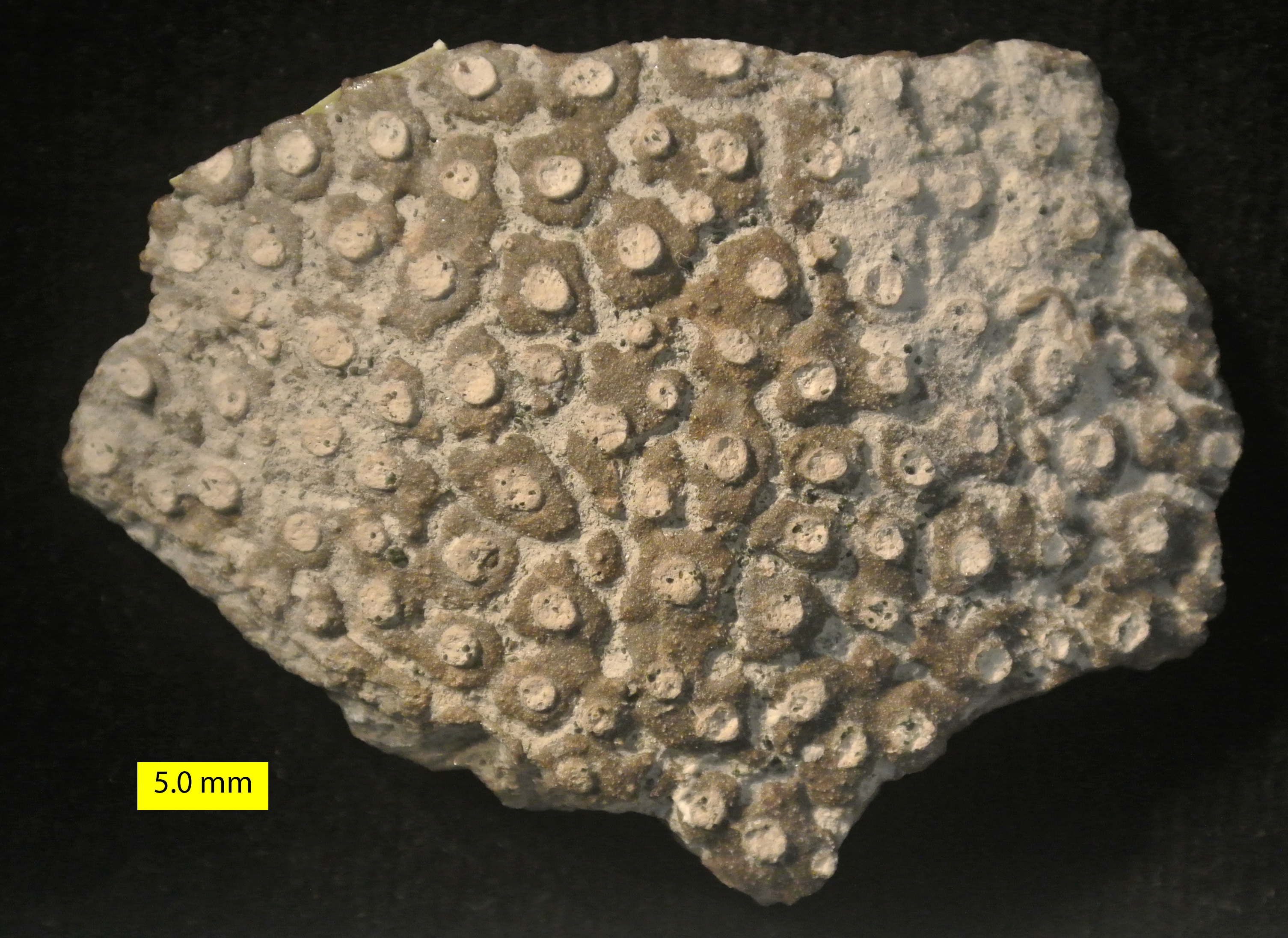
Entobia from the Prairie Bluff Chalk Formation (Upper Cretaceous). Preserved as a cast of the excavations.

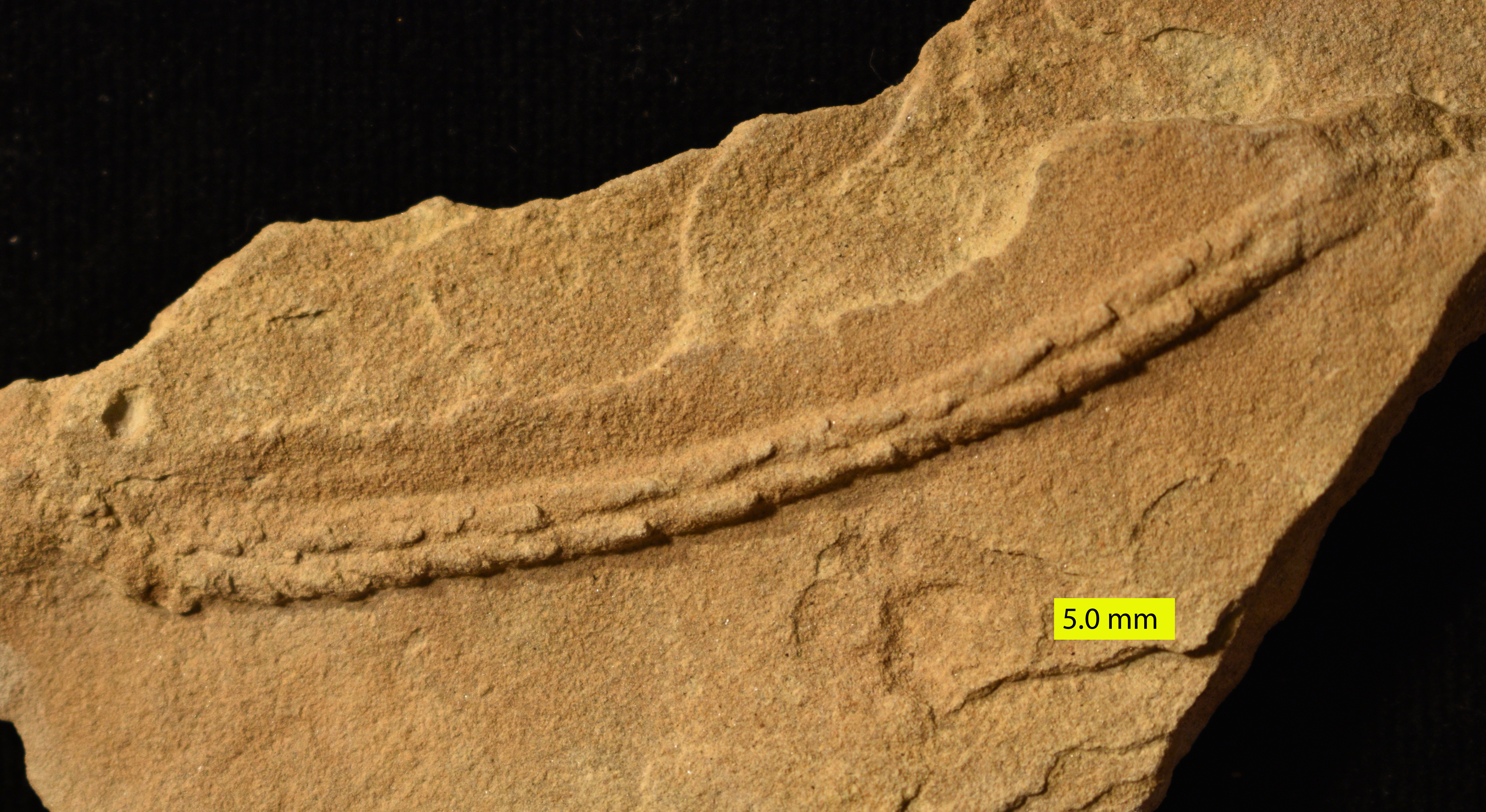
Trace fossil Gyrochorte from the Carmel Formation (Middle Jurassic) of SW Utah

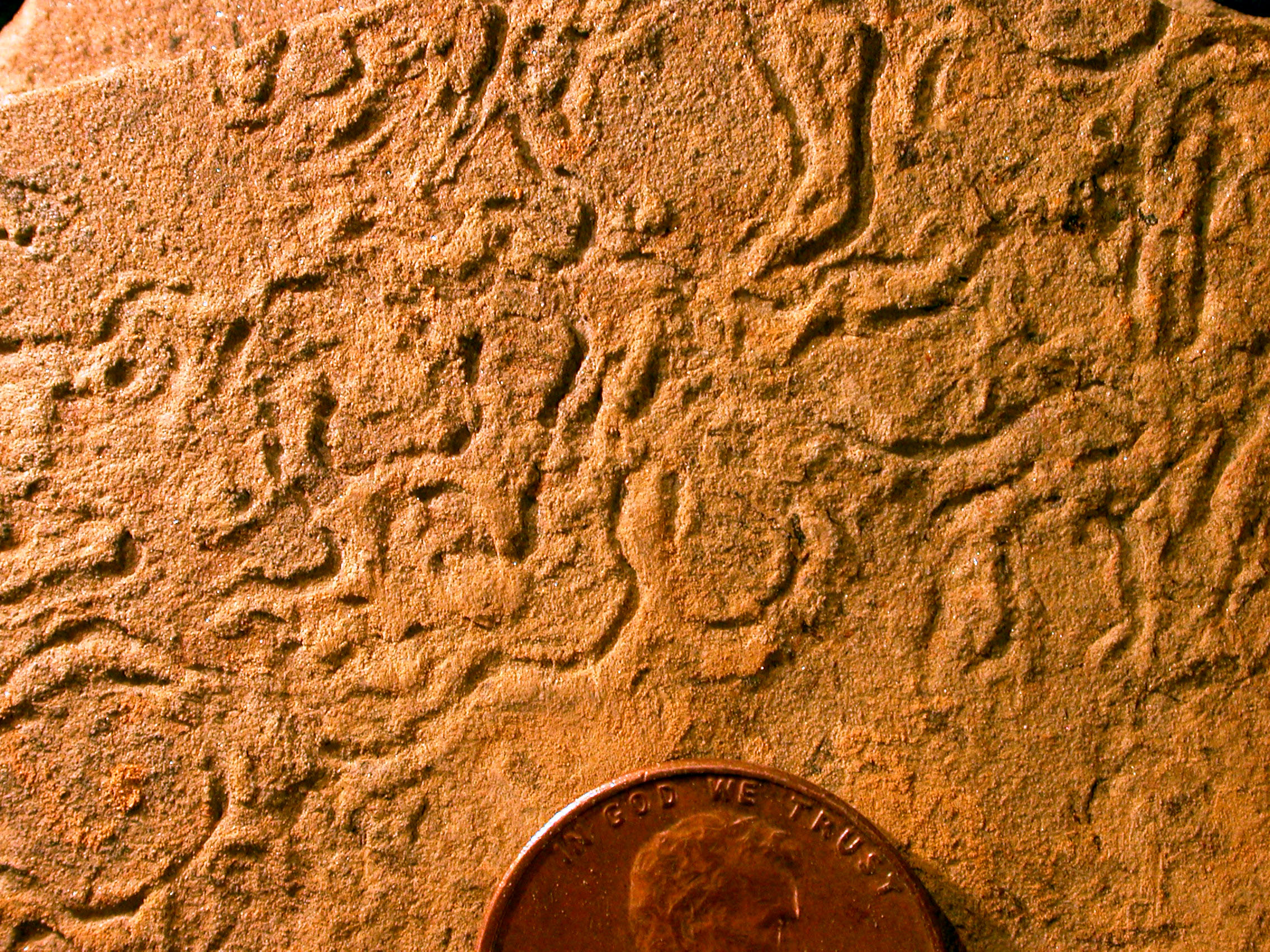
Helminthopsis ichnosp., a trace fossil from the Logan Formation (Lower Carboniferous) of Wooster, Ohio

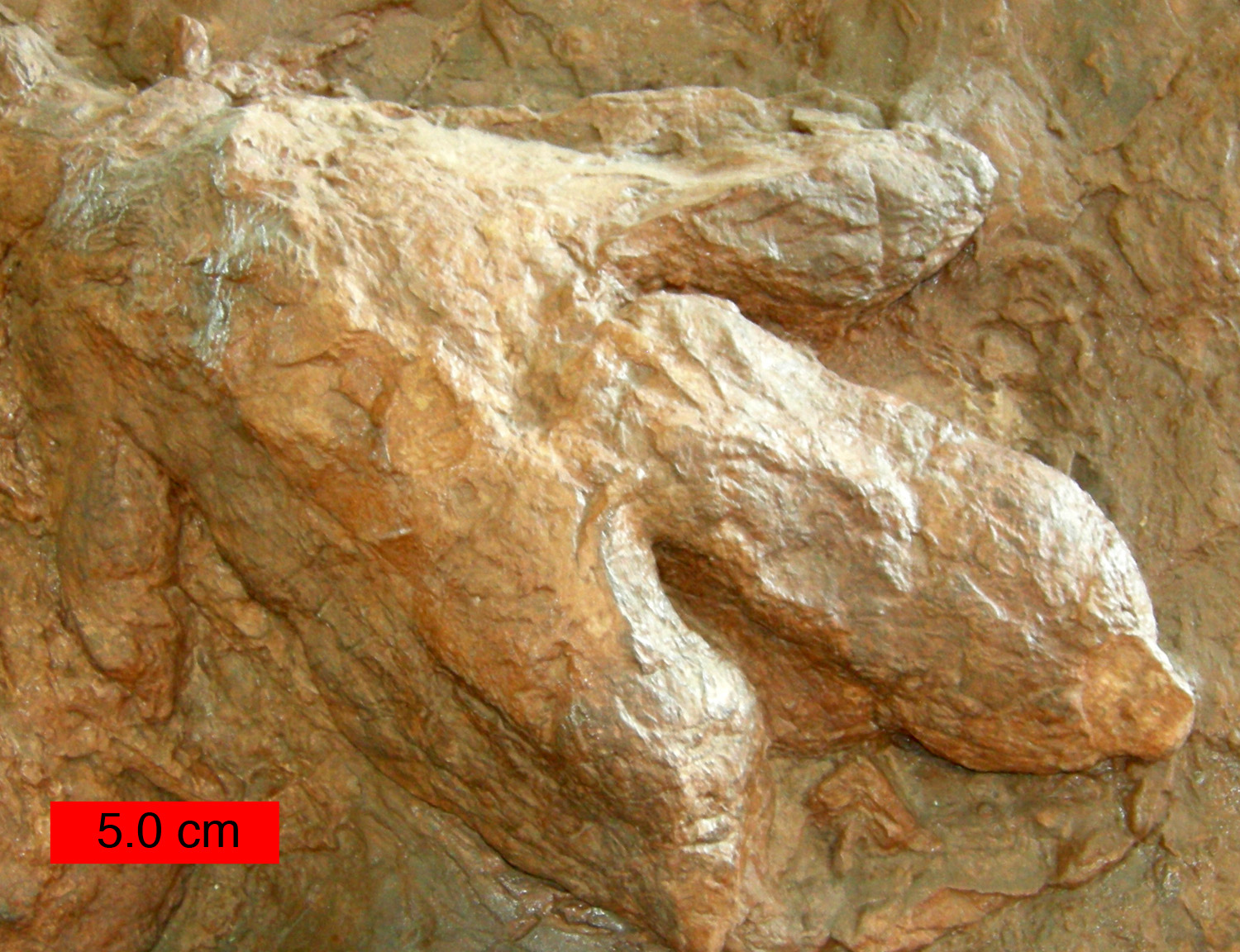
Gigandipus, a dinosaur footprint in the Lower Jurassic Moenave Formation at the St. George Dinosaur Discovery Site at Johnson Farm, southwestern Utah

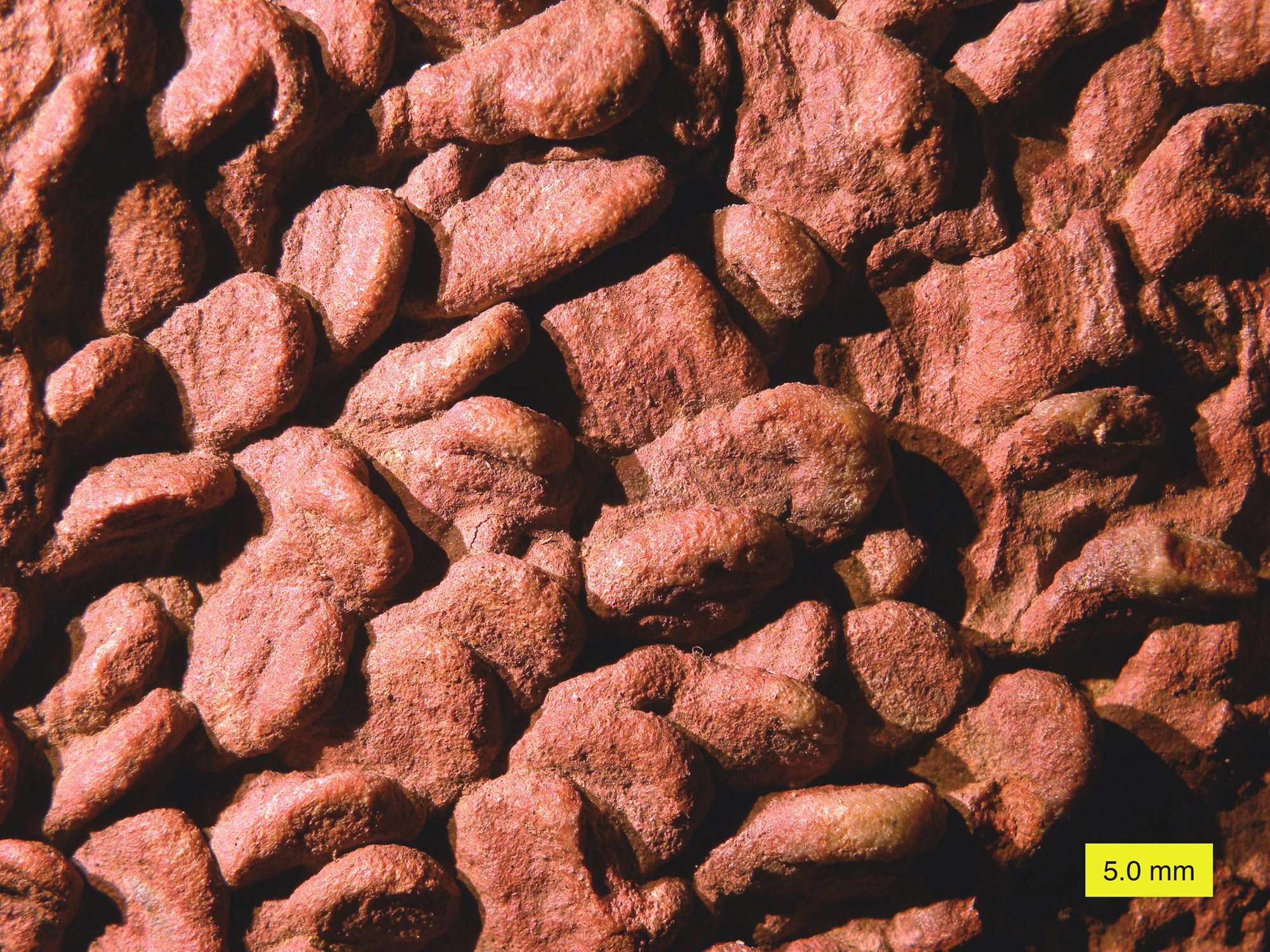
Lockeia from the Dakota Formation (Upper Cretaceous)

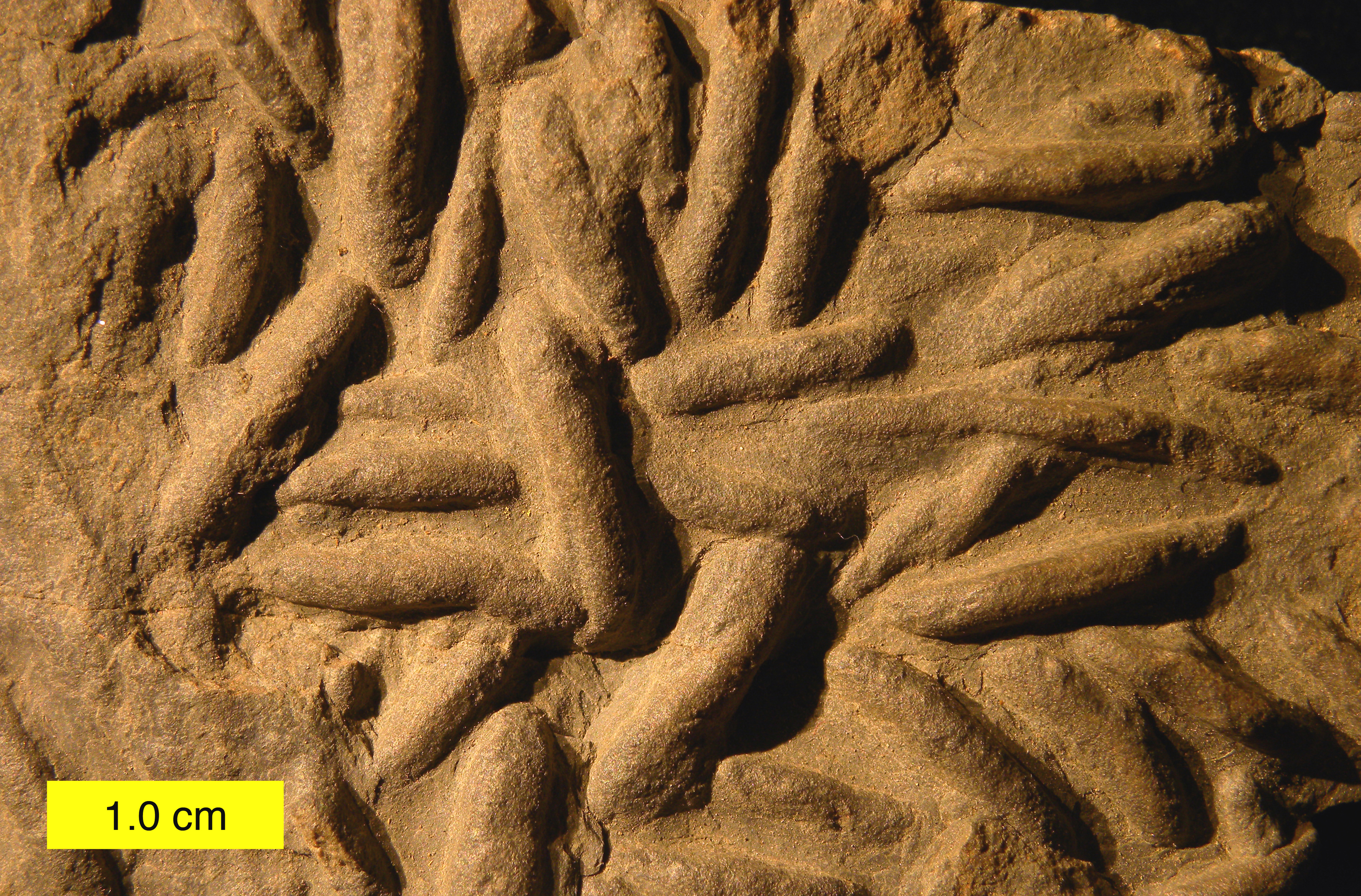
Lockeia from the Chagrin Shale (Upper Devonian) of northeastern Ohio. This is an example of the trace fossil ethological group Fugichnia.

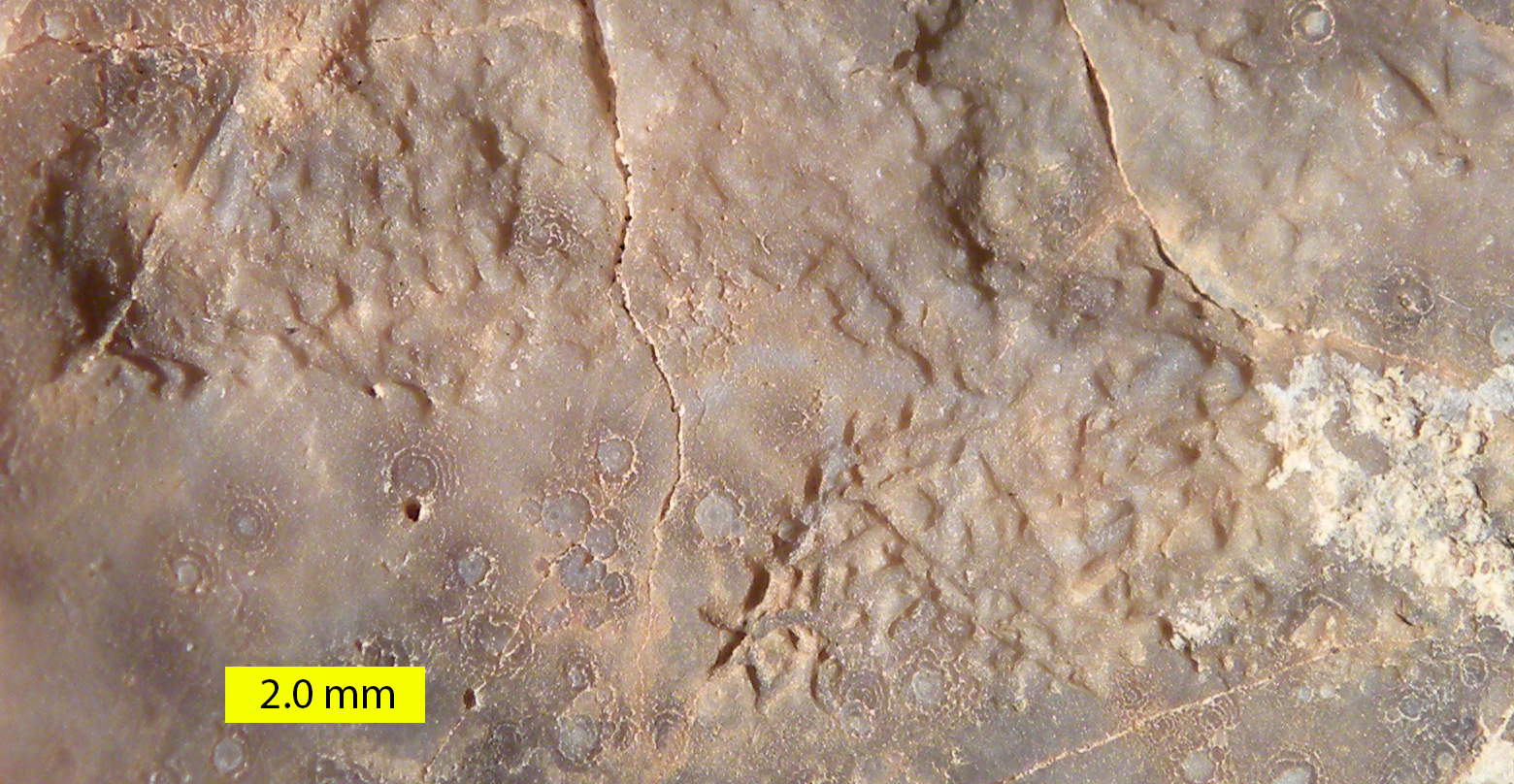
Gnathichnus pentax echinoid trace fossil on an oyster from the Cenomanian of Hamakhtesh Hagadol, southern Israel

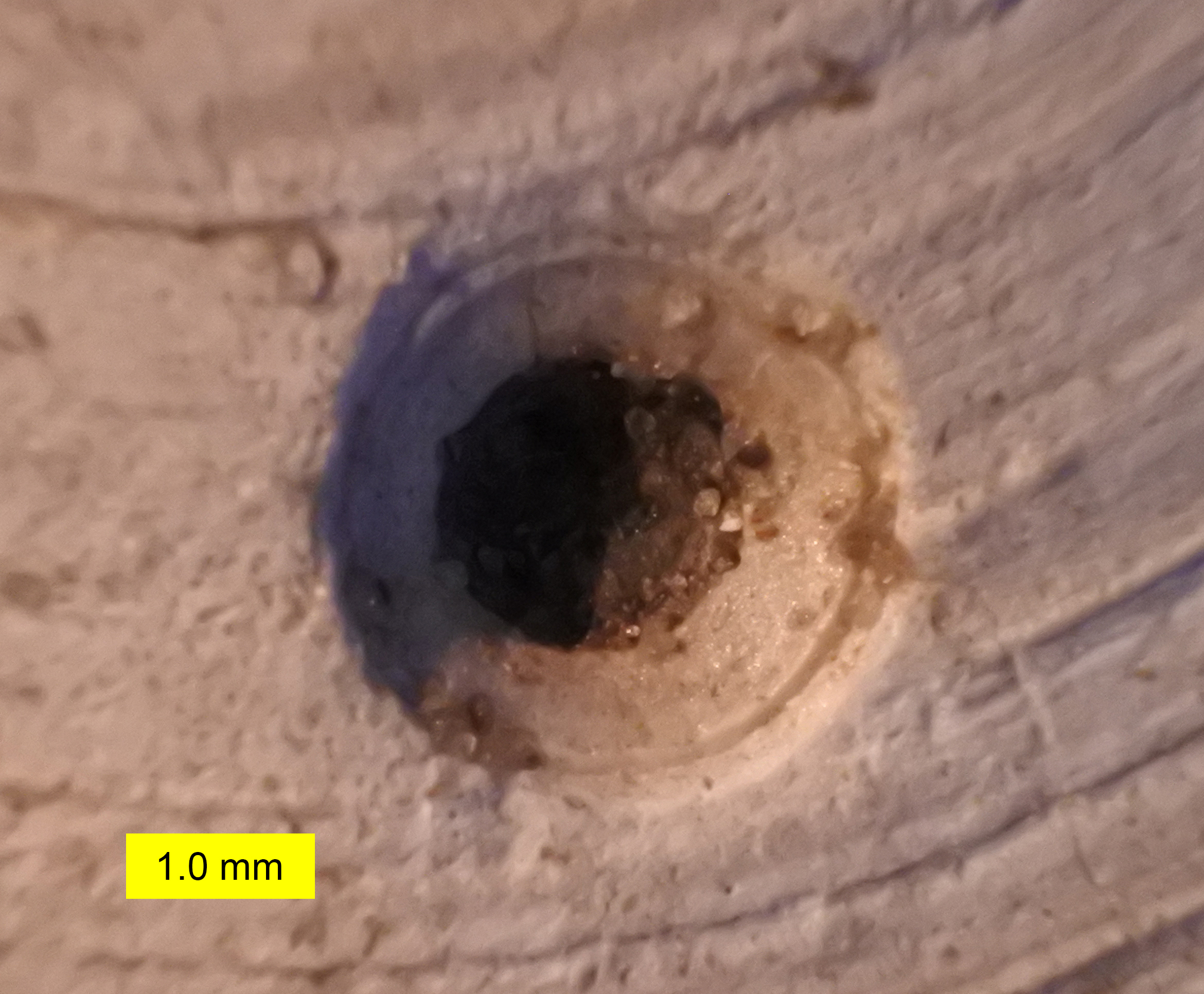
Naticid boring in Stewartia from the Calvert Formation, Zone 10, Calvert County, Maryland (Miocene)

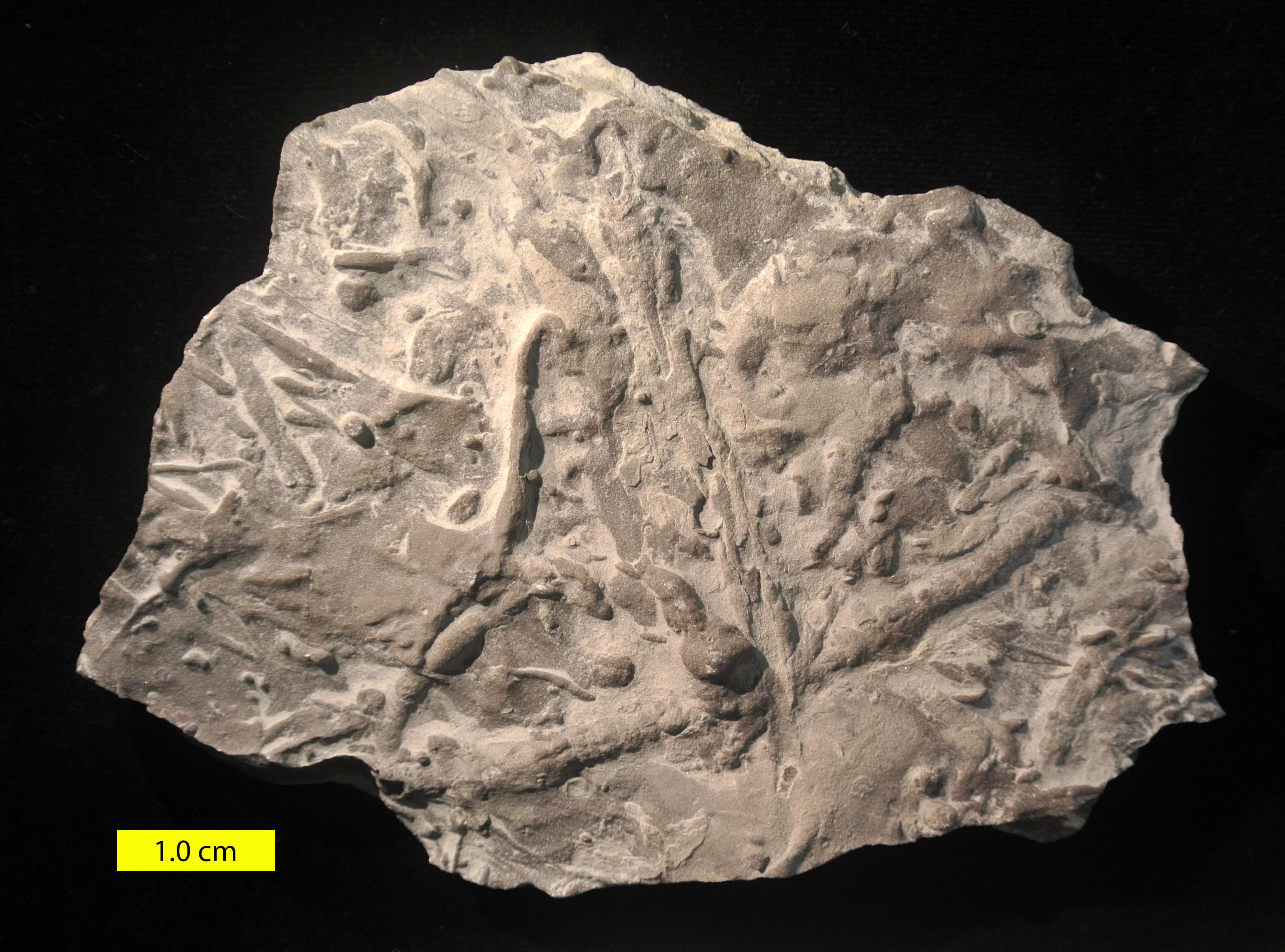
Trace fossils as convex hyporeliefs on bottom of bed; Bull Fork Formation (Upper Ordovician); Caesar Creek, Ohio

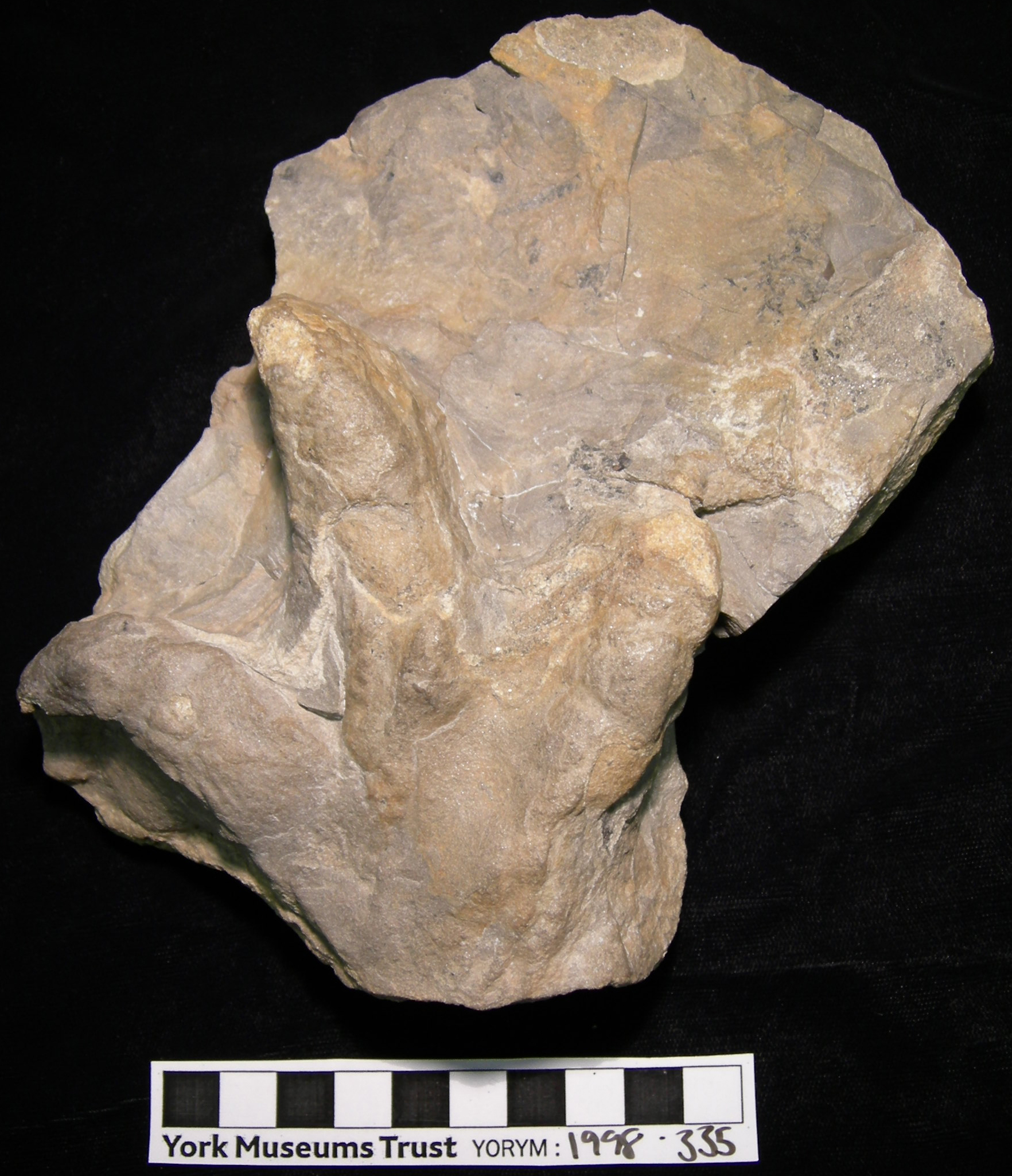
Inverted trace fossil of an unidentified tridactyl ornithopod

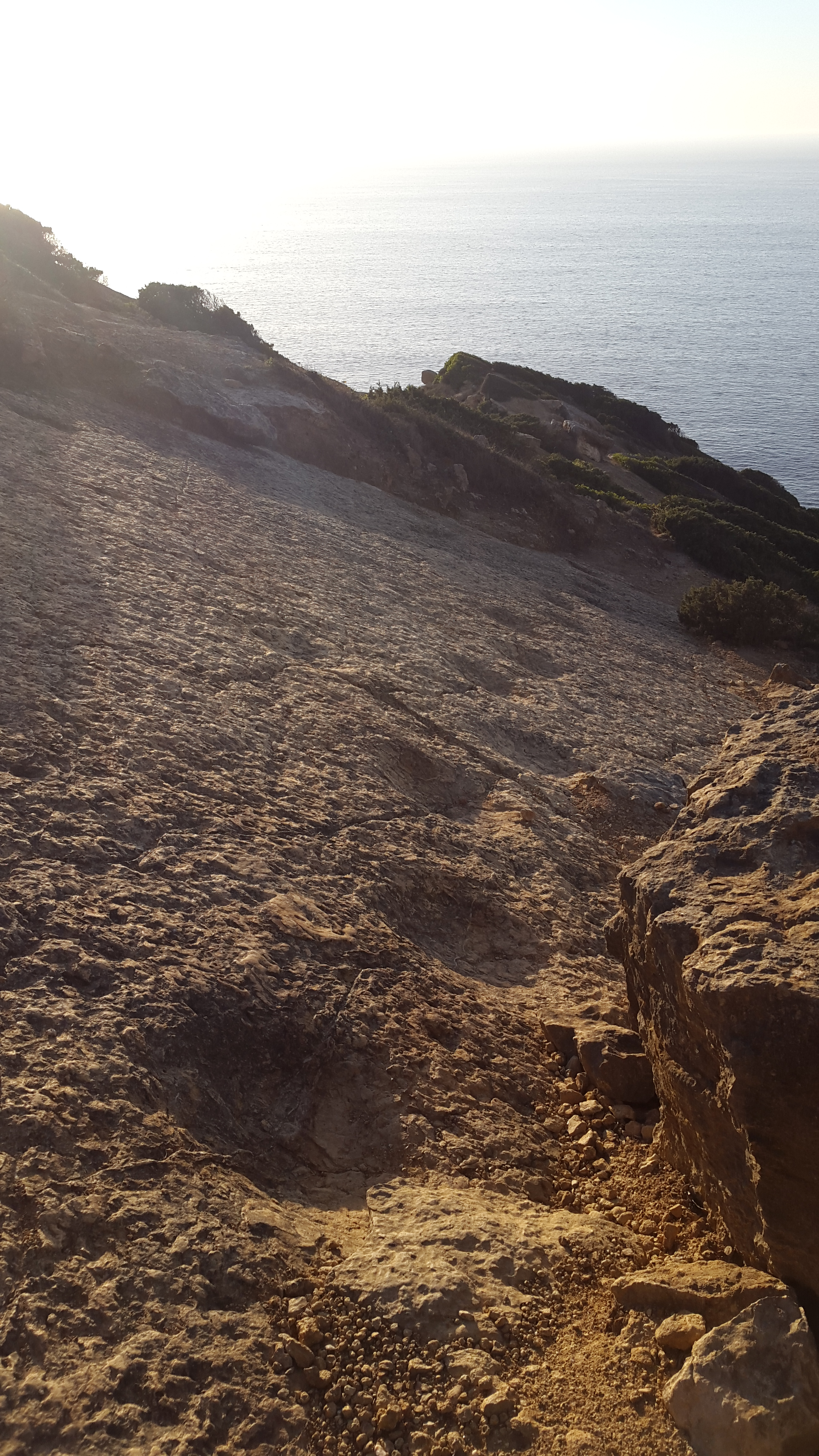
The main dinosaur trackway at the Lagosteiros Natural Monument site

== History ==
Charles Darwin's The Formation of Vegetable Mould through the Action of Worms is an example of a very early work on ichnology, describing bioturbation and, in particular, the burrowing of earthworms.

== See also ==
- 20th century in ichnology – Study of trace fossils
- Bioerosion – Erosion of hard ocean substrates by living organisms
- Brutalichnus
- Bird ichnology
- Burrow fossil – Trace fossil
- Egg fossil – Fossilized remains of eggs laid by ancient animals
- Ichnite – Fossilized footprint (ichnite) - fossilized footprints
- Index fossil
- List of non-Dinosauria fossil trackway articles
- Neoichnology
- Spoor (animal) – Traces left by an animal's passage
- Trace fossil classification – Systems for grouping fossilised evidence of biological activity
- Underprint (ichnology) – Type of fossil footprints
- Way up structure
