= List of non-Dinosauria fossil trackway articles =

This is a list of articles relating to fossil trackways that are outside the category of the numerous fossil dinosaur articles – that refer to tracks or trackways.

== List of non-Dinosauria fossil trackway articles ==
- Archaeotherium
- Arthropleura
- Chirotherium; (only a related species known)
- Climactichnites
- Cruziana
- Dromornithidae
- Eurypterid
- Hibbertopterus
- Laetoli
- Laetoli footprints
- Pterosaur
- Tetrapod
- Trace fossil
- Trilobite

=== Location, site articles ===
- Chuckanut Formation
- Coconino Sandstone
- Ipolytarnóc
- Minas Basin; "fish-fin" trackway
- Valentia Island

== See also ==
- Protichnites
- Trace fossil
