= Anoigmaichnus =

Trace fossil classification
- Ichnogenus: Anoigmaichnus; Vinn, Wilson, Mõtus and Toom, 2014

Type ichnospecies
- †Anoigmaichnus odinsholmensis Vinn, Wilson, Mõtus and Toom, 2014

Trace fossil

Anoigmaichnus is an ichnogenus of bioclaustrations (a type of trace fossil). Anoigmaichnus includes shafts perpendicular to their hosts' growth surfaces or tilted (up to 45°); conical to cylindrical; circular to oval cross-sections; lacking separate wall. Their apertures are elevated above their hosts' growth surfaces, forming short chimney-like structures. Anoigmaichnus is the world's earliest known macroscopic endobiotic symbiont and it may have been a parasite. It occurs in the Middle Ordovician bryozoans of Osmussaar Island, Estonia.

Wisshak, Knaust and Bertling (2019) state that Anoigmaichnus odinsholmensis resembles Trypanites weisei, which occasionally shows elevated apertures in its type material, and therefore they regard Anoigmaichnus as a junior synonym of Trypanites.
