= Tremichnus =

Trace fossil classification
- Ichnofamily: †Centrichnidae
- Ichnogenus: †Tremichnus; Brett, 1985

Type ichnospecies
- Tremichnus paraboloides Brett, 1985

Ichnospecies
- T. paraboloides Brett, 1985; T. puteolus Brett, 1985; T. excavatus (Donovan & Jagt, 2002)

Synonyms
- Balticapunctum Rozhnov, 1989

Trace fossil

Tremichnus is an ichnogenus or trace fossil. It is an embedment structure (i.e. bioclaustration) formed by an organism that inhibited growth of the crinoid host stereom. The most common endobiotic symbiont in Paleozoic crinoids is Tremichnus.
