= Burrinjuckia =

Trace fossil classification
- Ichnogenus: †Burrinjuckia; Chatterton, 1975

Trace fossil

Burrinjuckia is an ichnogenus of bioclaustrations (a type of trace fossil). Burrinjuckia includes outgrowths of the brachiopod's secondary shell with a hollow interior in the mantle cavity of a brachiopod. Burrinjuckia was probably a parasite. They have a stratigraphic range from the Late Ordovician to the Devonian. The earliest Burrinjuckia species B. clitambonitofilia Vinn, Wilson and Toom, 2014 occurs in brachiopod Clitambonites squamatus from the Late Ordovician oilshale of Estonia.
