= Urolite =

Trace fossil

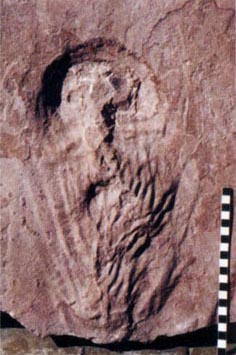
Urolite found in the Botucatu Formation in Araraquara, São Paulo - Brazil.

Urolite is a term composed of two Greek words, uro- meaning "urine" and lithos meaning "stone" and was first used to describe the fossil of a nonliquid urinary secretions produced by some groups of reptiles, in relation to coprolites. The first evidence of recorded liquid waste elimination attributed to a dinosaur was presented to the public in 2002, but no scientific paper had reported fossil evidence of liquid waste of tetrapods elimination to assume that dinosaurs urinated.

In 2004, a paper by paleontologist Marcelo Adorna Fernandes brought a study of trace fossils that had been preserved in three aeolian flagstones. These trace fossils show a pattern that could be formed by an abundant falling stream of fluid and that is different from the structures described before in other occurrences in the paleontological record. The aspect of these urolites is very similar to soil deformation caused by modern ostrich urination, and certain groups of dinosaurs could have a similar urinary physiology. These urolites are the first evidence of liquid waste attributed to dinosaurs.
