= Underprint (ichnology) =

Type of fossil footprints

In ichnology, underprints (also known as transmitted prints or ghost prints) are fossil footprints that are preserved in a sedimentary level beneath that which was directly imprinted upon by the foot of the trackmaker. The concept goes all the way back to the 1858 ichnological research of the Reverend Edward Hitchcock performed on the Newark Basin dinosaur tracks. Because underprints are produced indirectly they can only preserve the basic anatomy of the trackmaker's foot, whereas true tracks can preserve fine details skin impressions in favorable circumstances.

== Other usage of the term ==
Richard Thulborn has used the term "underprint" to refer to a different phenomenon. Thulborn applied the term to track fossils created by the erosion of track casts where the removal of the cast from the track leaves only the impressions of pads in the underlying rock.
