= Kinesis =

Kinesis may refer to:

- Kinesis (biology), a movement or activity of a cell or an organism in response to a stimulus
- Kinesis (band), an alternative rock band from Bolton, England
- Kinesis (genus), a genus of earwigs
- Kinesis (keyboard), a line of ergonomic computer keyboards
- Kinesis (magazine), a magazine published by Vancouver Status of Women
- Motion, change or activity in Aristotelian philosophical concepts of potentiality and actuality
- Kinesis Industry, a manufacturer of bicycle frames and components
- Kinesis Industry, a holdings company for Kinesis Recruitment and Kinesis Property
- Amazon Kinesis, a real-time data processing platform provided by Amazon Web Services

== See also ==
- Kinetic (disambiguation)
- Kinetics (disambiguation)
