= Oikobesalon =

Oikobesalon Temporal range: Cambrian–Silurian

Trace fossil classification
- Ichnogenus: †Oikobesalon; Thomas and Smith, 1998

Trace fossil

Oikobesalon is an ichnogenus of unbranched, elongate burrows (a type of trace fossil) in originally soft substrate. The burrows are unbranched and straight, single-entrance with circular to elliptical cross-section. They are covered with thin mineralized lining. The burrow lining has a transverse ornamentation in the form of fusiform annulation. The earliest Oikobesalon traces are known from the Cambrian.
