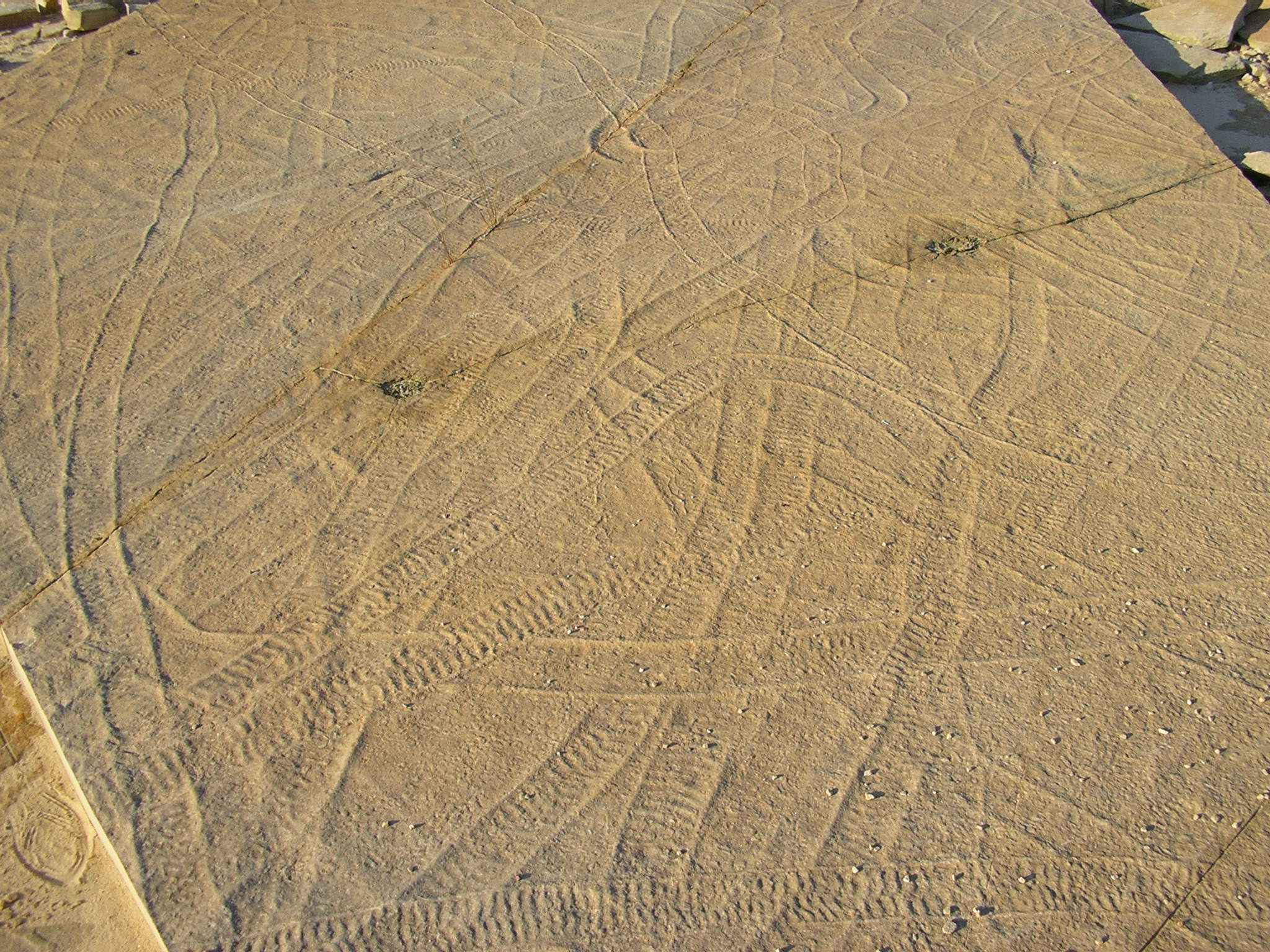
- The trails Climactichnites wilsoni were produced across the surface of the sediment, Cambrian, Blackberry Hill, Wisconsin.
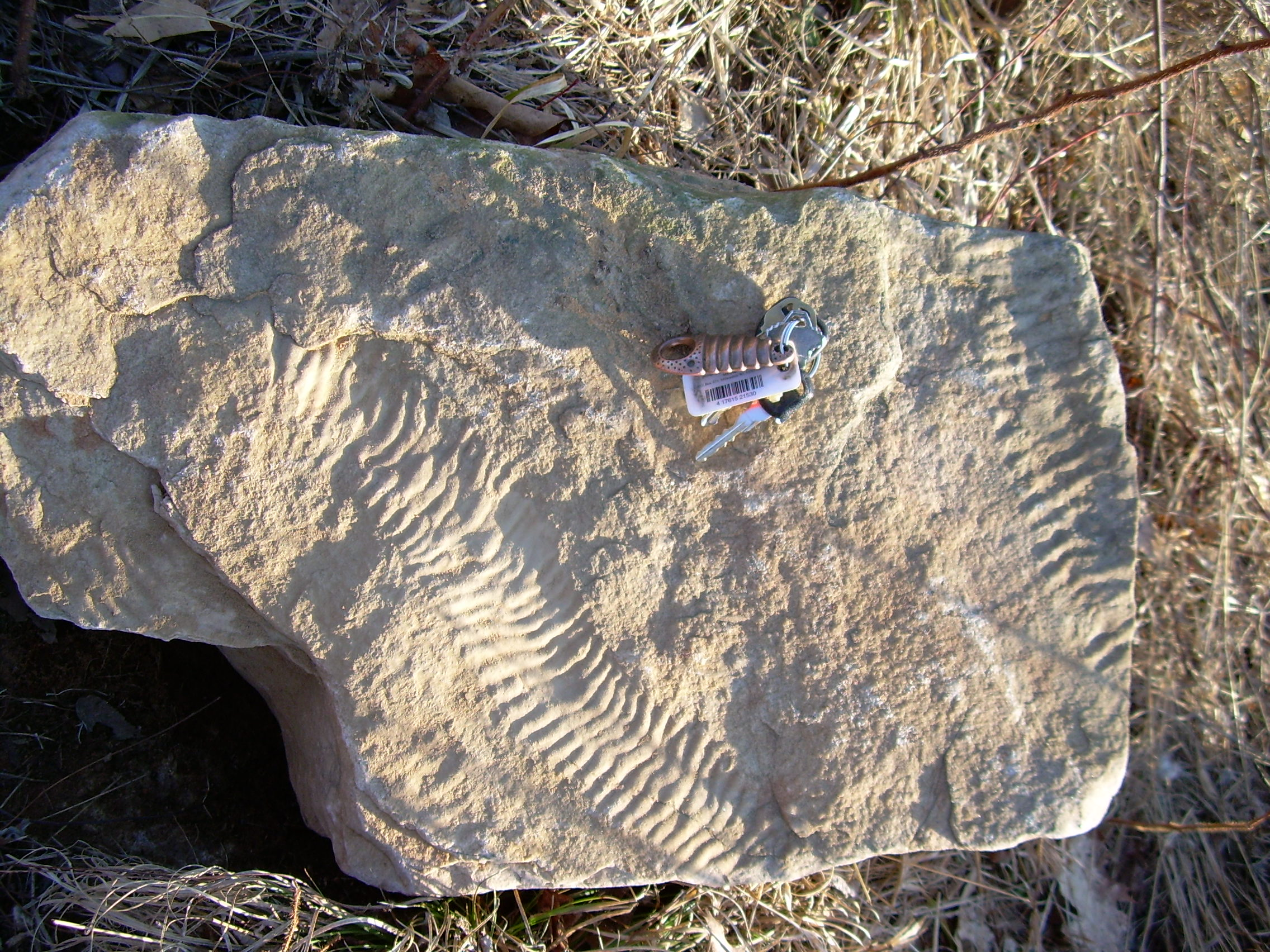
- The burrows Climactichnites youngi were produced within the sediment, Cambrian, Blackberry Hill, Wisconsin.

Trace fossil classification
- Ichnogenus: Climactichnites; Logan, 1860

= Climactichnites =

Climactichnites Temporal range: Middle Cambrian–Late Cambrian

Enigmatic Cambrian fossil

The trail Climactichnites blackberriensis, from the Cambrian of central Wisconsin. Image credit: K.C. Gass, 2025.

Climactichnites is an enigmatic Cambrian fossil formed subaqueously or subaerially on or within sandy tidal flats around 500 million years ago. It is a trail or burrow consisting of undulating bars and furrows oriented at an angle to the direction of travel. It has been interpreted in many different ways in the past, but it is now thought to be a trace fossil of a slug-like organism.

== Morphology ==
There are three ichnospecies within Climactichnites. C. wilsoni is a trail that includes lateral ridges; C. youngi is a burrow that lacks lateral ridges; and C. blackberriensis is a trail that lacks lateral ridges and whose transverse bars are interrupted along the midline by low ridges or a flattened area of inconsistent width. An additional trace fossil, called Musculopodus, is sometimes found at one end of Climactichnites trails and represents the body imprint of the animal while it was stationary. Climactichnites range from 0.8 to 30 cm wide and may exceed ten feet long, making Climactichnites by far the largest Cambrian trace fossil. Based on measured ratios of Musculopodus imprints, the animal itself is estimated to have reached 69 cm long.

== Occurrence ==
Currently, Climactichnites is known only from North America (Missouri, New York, Wisconsin, and Texas in the United States, and Quebec and Ontario in Canada), portions of which were submerged under a shallow equatorial sea during the Cambrian Period. The fossil is found in fine- to coarse-grained sandstones and orthoquartzites which represent sandy, intertidal beach deposits. Microbial mats probably enabled the trace to be preserved.

== Interpretation ==
Early attempts to interpret the fossil as the body of an alga or siphonophore are easily falsified. Climactichnites is now thought to represent the trail or burrow of an organism moving, respectively, on top of or through the sediment. The animal apparently had a muscular foot and moved by extending either side of its body alternately (sometimes both sides may have been extended in unison) to produce the v-shaped transverse bars. Certainly the animal lacked any appendages, as is evidenced by cross-cutting relationships of the trail with sedimentary structures such as ripple marks. While the identity of the trace-maker remains conjectural, Climactichnites was most likely produced by a large slug-like mollusc; modern gastropods have been observed to produce similar traces. Since it is often associated with surface-produced sedimentary structures, it may have been produced by one of the earliest animals to move about on land. The binding effect of microbial mats on the sediment surface is believed to have contributed to the exceptional preservation of Climactichnites trails.
