= Kinesis (magazine) =

Canadian magazine

- Categories: Feminist magazine
- Publisher: Vancouver Status of Women
- Founded: 1974
- Final issue: 2001
- Country: Canada
- Language: English

Kinesis was a magazine published from 1974 to 2001, by Vancouver Status of Women, in Vancouver, British Columbia, Canada. Subtitled "news about women that's not in the dailies", it was published 10 times each year and carried news with a social change and feminist perspective. It acted as a forum for queer, immigrant, anti-classist, and anti-ablecentrist voices.

It was edited by Emma Kivisild from 1984 to 1986, Esther Shannon from 1986 to 1988, Nancy Pollak from 1988 to 1992, and Fatima Jaffer from 1992 to 1994.

Vancouver Status of Women was funded in part by government grants. Funding issues and changes in editorial direction led to the shuttering of the magazine in 2001.

Many issues of Kinesis are accessible online in the University of British Columbia Library's digital collections.
