= Bioclaustration =

Form of symbiosis

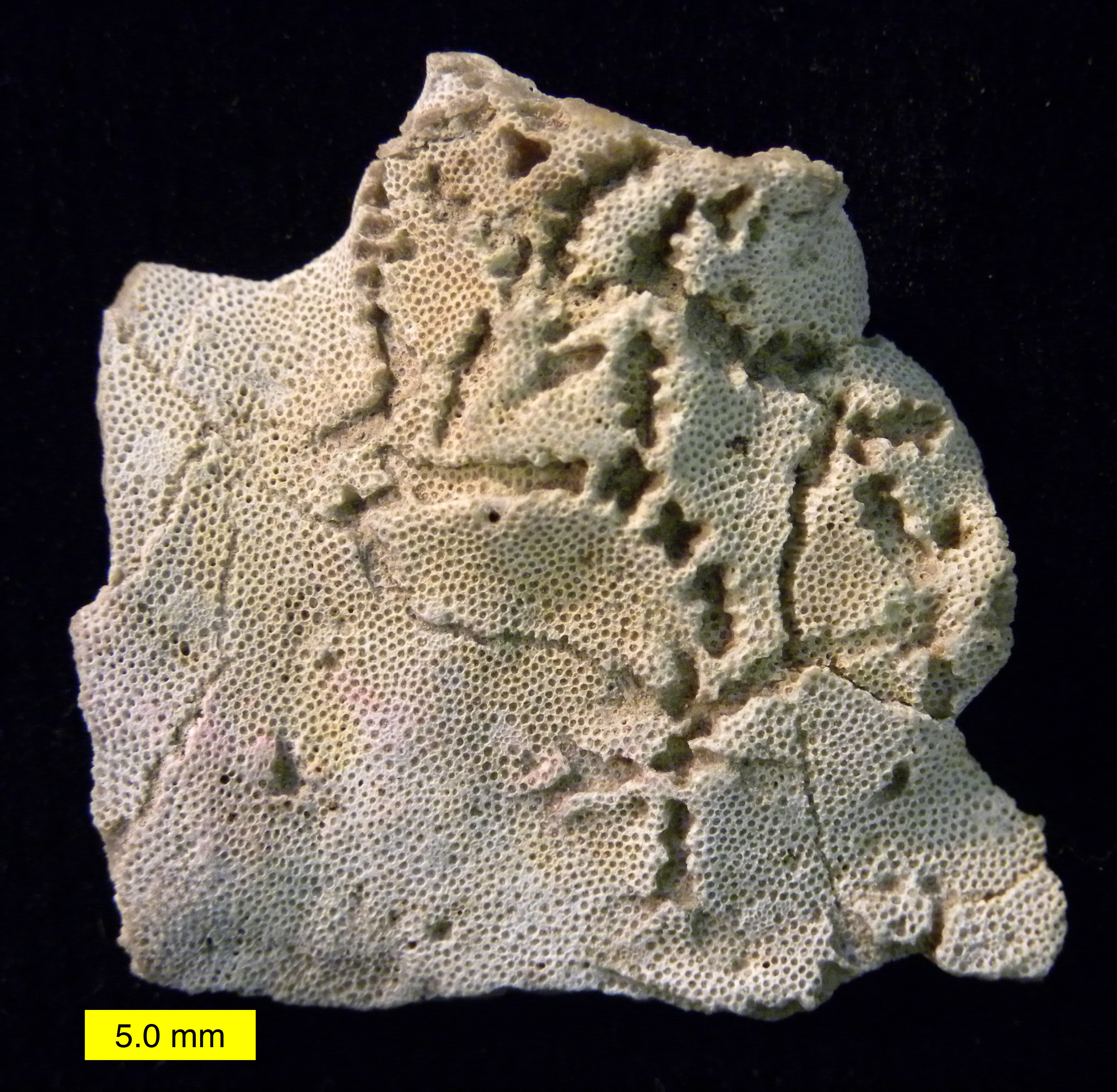
The star-shaped holes (Catellocaula vallata) in this Upper Ordovician bryozoan represent a soft-bodied organism preserved by bioclaustration in the bryozoan skeleton. (See Palmer and Wilson, 1988)

Bioclaustration is kind of interaction when one organism (usually soft bodied) is embedded in a living substrate (i.e. skeleton of another organism); it means "biologically walled-up". In case of symbiosis the walling-up is not complete and both organisms stay alive (Palmer and Wilson, 1988).
