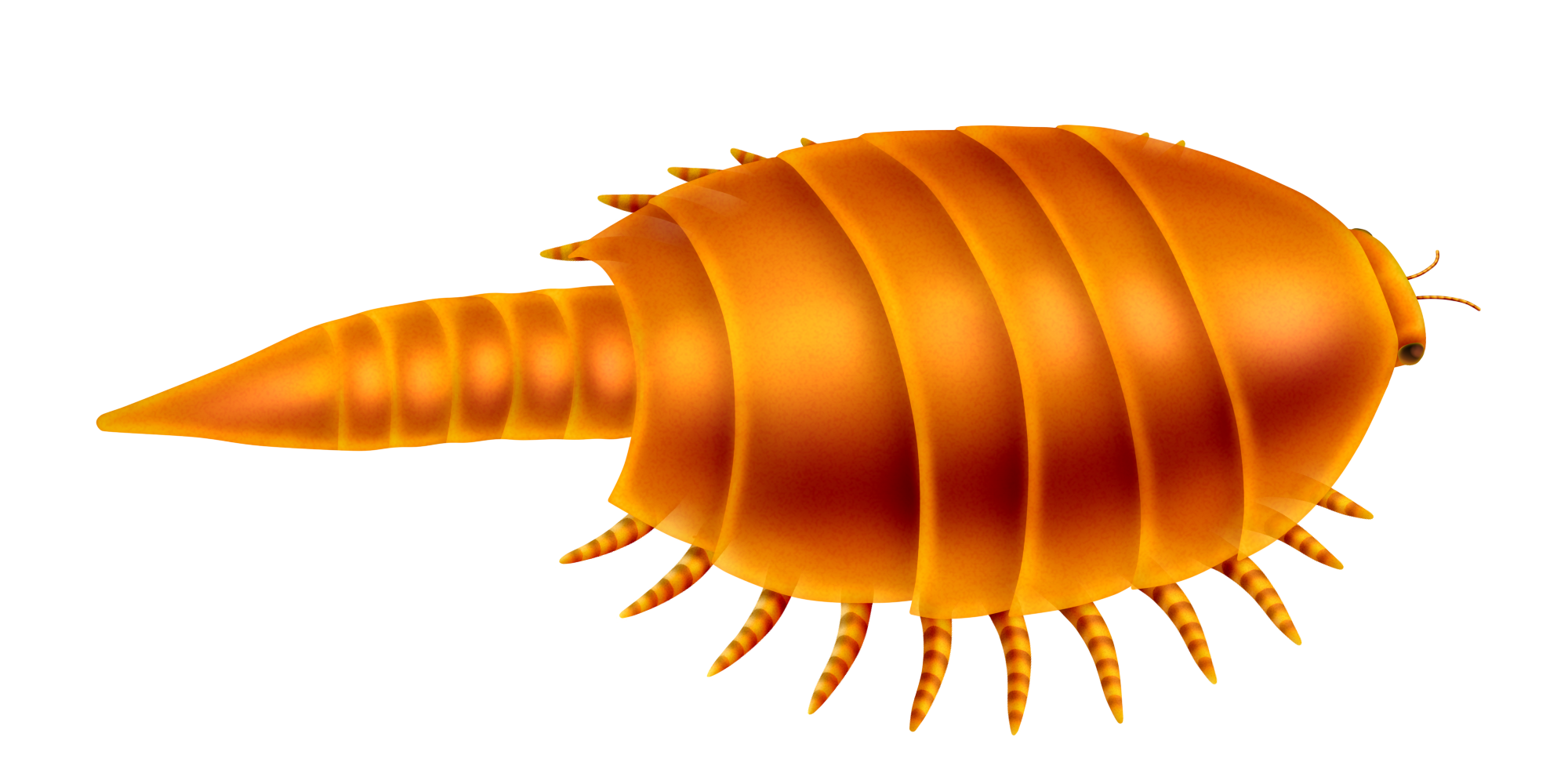
- Reconstruction of A. machu

Scientific classification
- Domain: Eukaryota
- Kingdom: Animalia
- Phylum: Arthropoda
- Subclass: †Euthycarcinoidea
- Genus: †Apankura; Vaccari et al., 2004
- Species: †A. machu

Binomial name
- †Apankura machu Vaccari et al., 2004

= Apankura =

Apankura Temporal range: Furongian

Extinct genus of euthycarcinoid

Apankura is an extinct genus of Cambrian euthycarcinoids from the Santa Rosita Formation of Argentina. The genus contains a single species, Apankura machu. It was at one point the only Cambrian euthycarcinoid. However, Mosineia and Mictomerus are likely older.

== Description ==
Apankura is roughly 4 centimetres (1.6 in) long, and has large mandibles, a trait previously unknown from euthycarcinoids. The antennae are uniramous like other euthycarcinoids, with a possible buccal complex present behind the mandibles. No post-mandibular oral appendages are present. The pre-abdomen is composed of five tergites, with 11 uniramous limb pairs, with the tergites showing "segment decoupling" where there are more limbs than tergites. The pre-abdomen also has 11 sternites, each roughly 3 times wider than long. The pre-abdominal limbs match other euthycarcinoids, although they taper distally and lack setae. The apodemes are preserved as several dark rods. The post-abdomen is incomplete but composed of at least six segments, all lacking limbs, with the gut preserved as a dark line in the centre. A circular structure on the second post-abdominal segment is of unclear function, although it may be a gonopore. Apankura is unique among euthycarcinoids due to the reduced anterior pre-abdominal limbs, a longer post-abdomen and relatively few limb podomeres.

== Etymology ==
Apankura derives from a Quechua word meaning "crab", whilst machu derives from a word meaning "grandfather" in reference to the age of the fossils.
