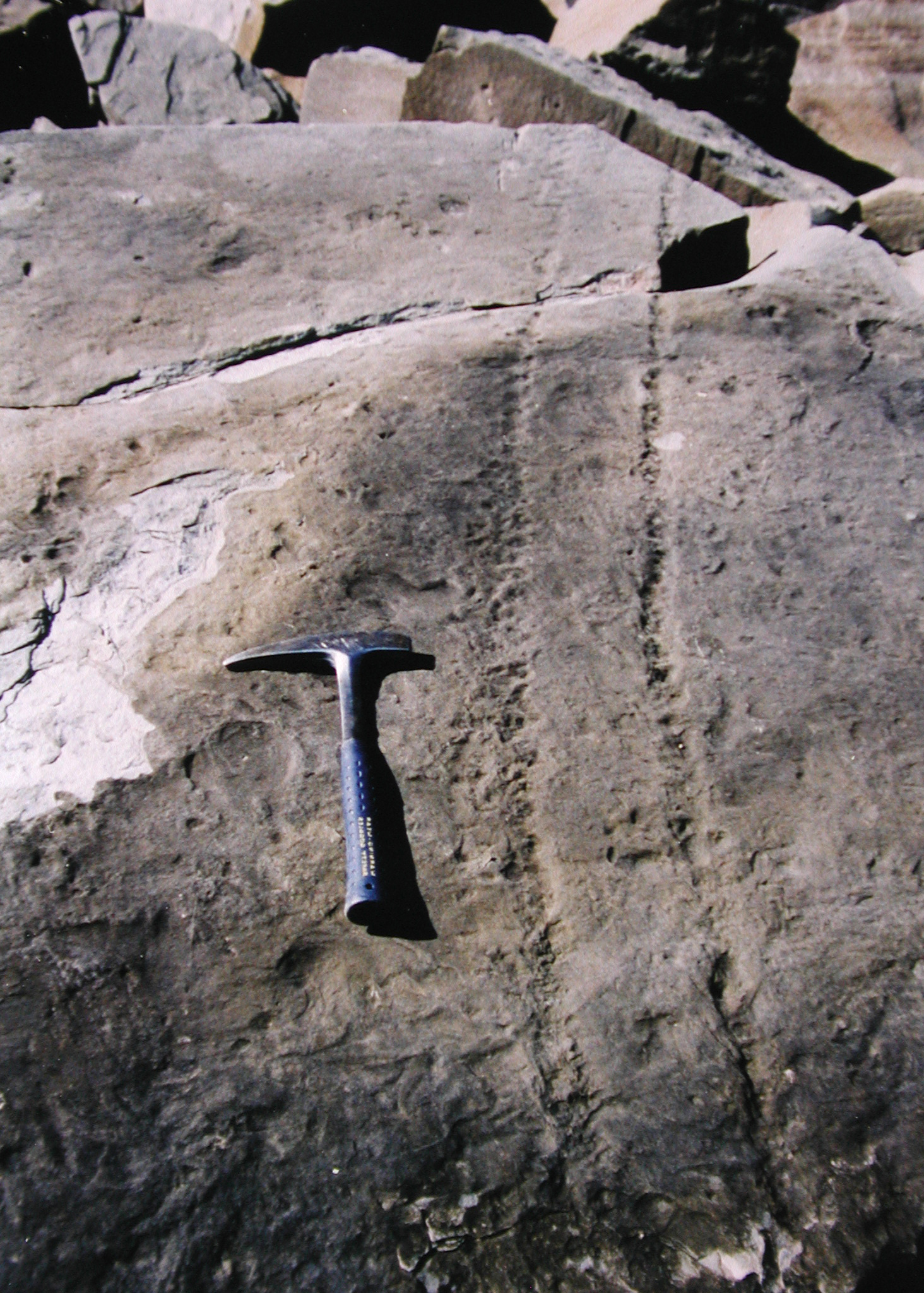
- Oblique bedding plane view of large Diplichnites from the Joggins Formation (Pennsylvanian), Cumberland Basin, Nova Scotia. This trackway was made by the myriapod Arthropleura.

Trace fossil classification
- Domain: Eukaryota
- Kingdom: Animalia
- Phylum: Arthropoda
- Ichnogenus: †Diplichnites d'Orbigny, 1842

= Diplichnites =

Diplichnites Temporal range: Cambrian–Holocene

Ichnogenus of Arthropod trackways

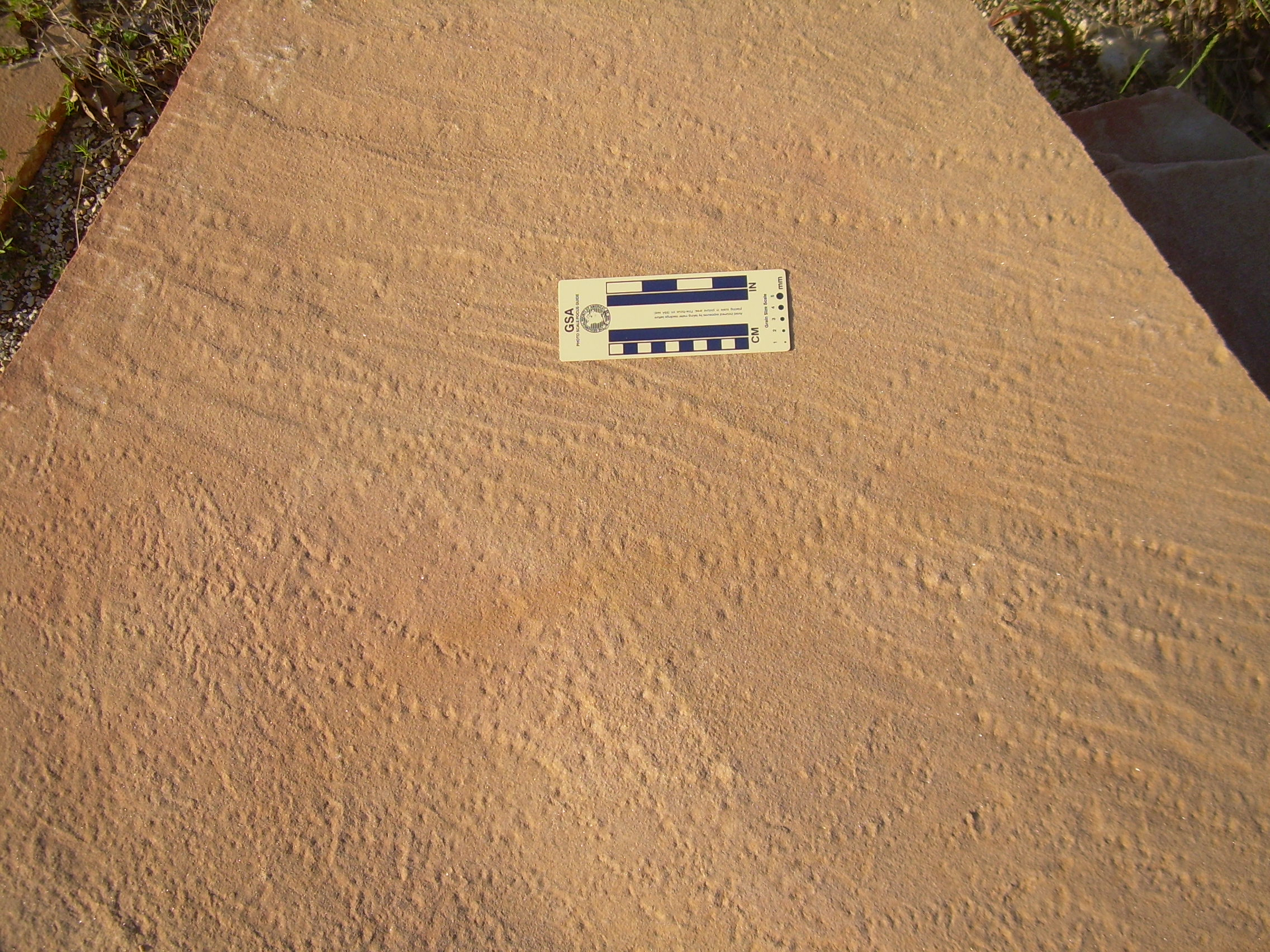
The trackways Diplichnites from the Elk Mound Group (Cambrian), Blackberry Hill, central Wisconsin. These may have been made by the euthycarcinoid, Mosineia macnaughtoni, which is also found at Blackberry Hill.

Diplichnites are arthropod trackways with two parallel rows of blunt to elongate, closely spaced tracks oriented approximately perpendicularly to the mid-line of the trackway. The term is more often used for the ichnofossils of this description; however, similar trackways from recent arthropods are sometimes given this name as well.

== The Diplichnites makers ==
This type of trackway was originally based on large fossils from Pennsylvanian strata of Nova Scotia, when Sir J. W. Dawson named it in 1873. Dawson proposed that Diplichnites were produced by a fish “walking” in shallow water on pectoral or ventral fin spines. Previous to this he had suggested that a large crustacean, annelid worm or myriapod (such as a millipede) could have made them. Subsequent evidence has supported this earlier interpretation. The fossils on which this ichnotaxon was based are now thought to be from giant myriapods, such as Arthropleura. The Scottish Diplichnites cuithensis could have been the result of a 1-meter-long arthropleurid walking.

In the decades following Dawson's work, the trackways of several other arthropods were also included within Diplichnites – particularly, trilobites, which are known from marine Paleozoic deposits around the world. In addition, recent evidence indicates that some Diplichnites trackways from certain Cambrian intertidal and subaerial deposits of North America, especially the Potsdam and Elk Mound Groups, were produced by euthycarcinoids. In that scenario, the Diplichnites may have been undertracks that penetrated to the underlying layer of sediment, and the fossil trackways thus produced on the top surface (preserving the impression of the dragging tail) were Protichnites.
