= Blackberry Hill =

Lagerstätte in Wisconsin, USA

- Stratigraphic range: Mid Cambrian–Late Cambrian
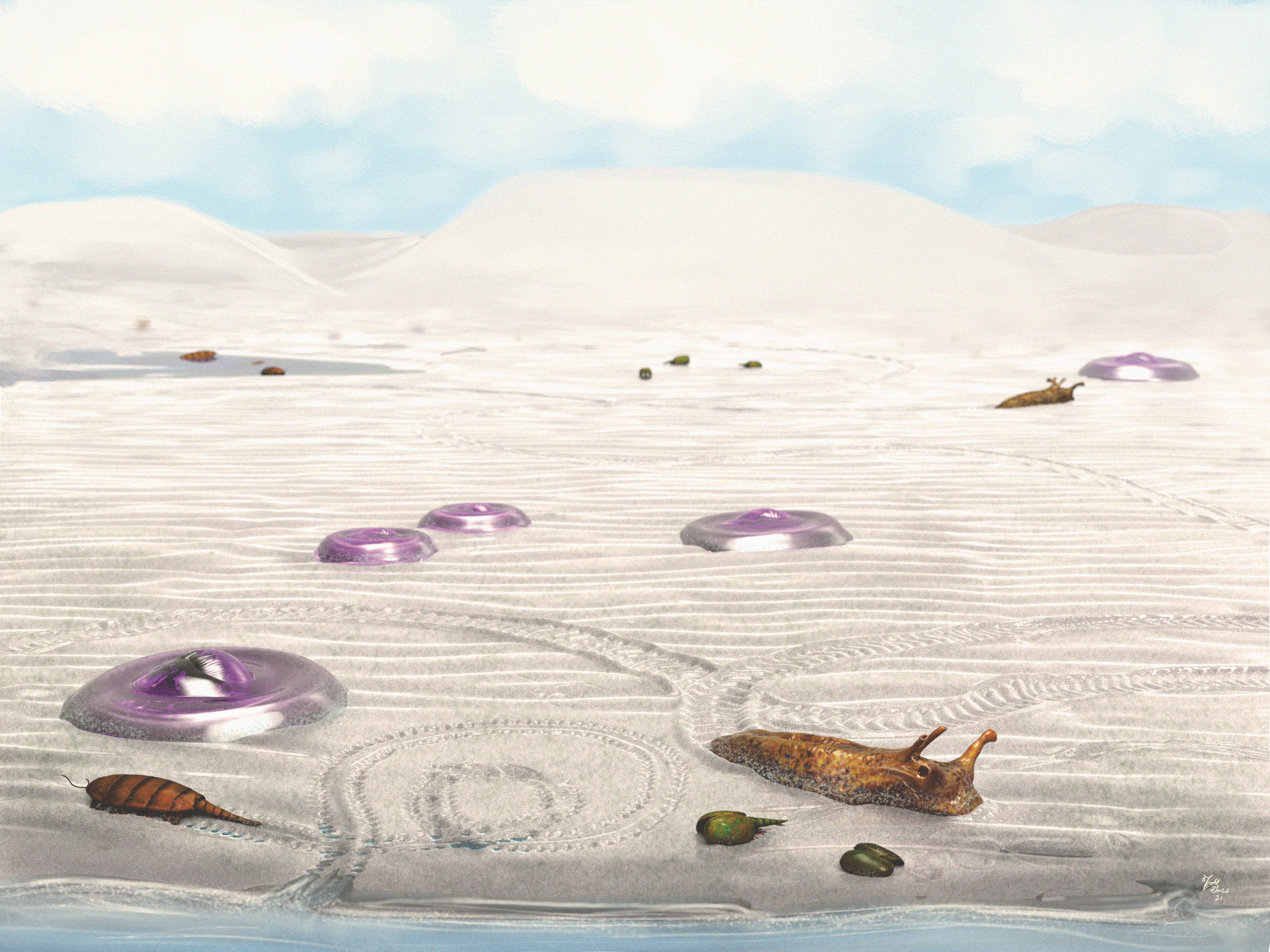
- Tidal flat at Blackberry Hill, showing its animals and their traces.
- Type: Konservat-Lagerstätte
- Unit of: Elk Mound Group
- Sub-units: Mount Simon Formation; Wonewoc Formation

Lithology
- Primary: Sandstone and orthoquartzite

Location
- Coordinates: 44°42′39.24″N 89°30′43.40″W
- Region: Wisconsin
- Country: United States

Type section
- Named for: Topographic feature (a summit) in Marathon County

Blackberry Hill is a Konservat-Lagerstätte of Cambrian age located within the Elk Mound Group in Marathon County, Wisconsin.It is found in a series of quarries and outcrops that are notable for their large concentration of exceptionally preserved trace fossils in Cambrian tidal flats. One quarry in particular also has the distinction of preserving some of the first land animals. These are preserved as three-dimensional casts, which is unusual for Cambrian animals that are only lightly biomineralized. Additionally, Blackberry Hill is the first occurrence recognized to include Cambrian mass strandings of scyphozoans (jellyfish).

== Age and stratigraphic placement ==
The strata at Blackberry Hill are known to belong to the Elk Mound Group; however, the lack of good stratigraphic markers (i.e., index fossils) in some Blackberry Hill localities, coupled with uncertainties about the age range of the Elk Mound Group itself, make it difficult to assign a precise age to these strata. Many researchers consider these rocks to be Late Cambrian, which is the age to which the Elk Mound Group was originally assigned; however, some recent authors now believe the Elk Mound Group and the fossils of Blackberry Hill could date back to the Middle Cambrian, based on certain fossils obtained from other areas.

== Geological and environmental setting ==
Most of the strata are composed of well bedded quartz sandstone and orthoquartzite. They were deposited mainly on intertidal and supratidal zones of tidal flats of an inland sea of the supercontinent Laurentia. Ripple marks and numerous other sedimentary structures identical to those found on modern beaches abound on the strata surfaces. One of the most conspicuous features is extensive areas of specific structures not unlike those associated with modern biofilms and microbial mats. There is evidence suggesting that the feeding potential of this presumed microbial material was one of the forces that lured the first animals out of the sea. It is also believed that the same material aided in the exceptional preservation of many of Blackberry Hill's trace fossils.

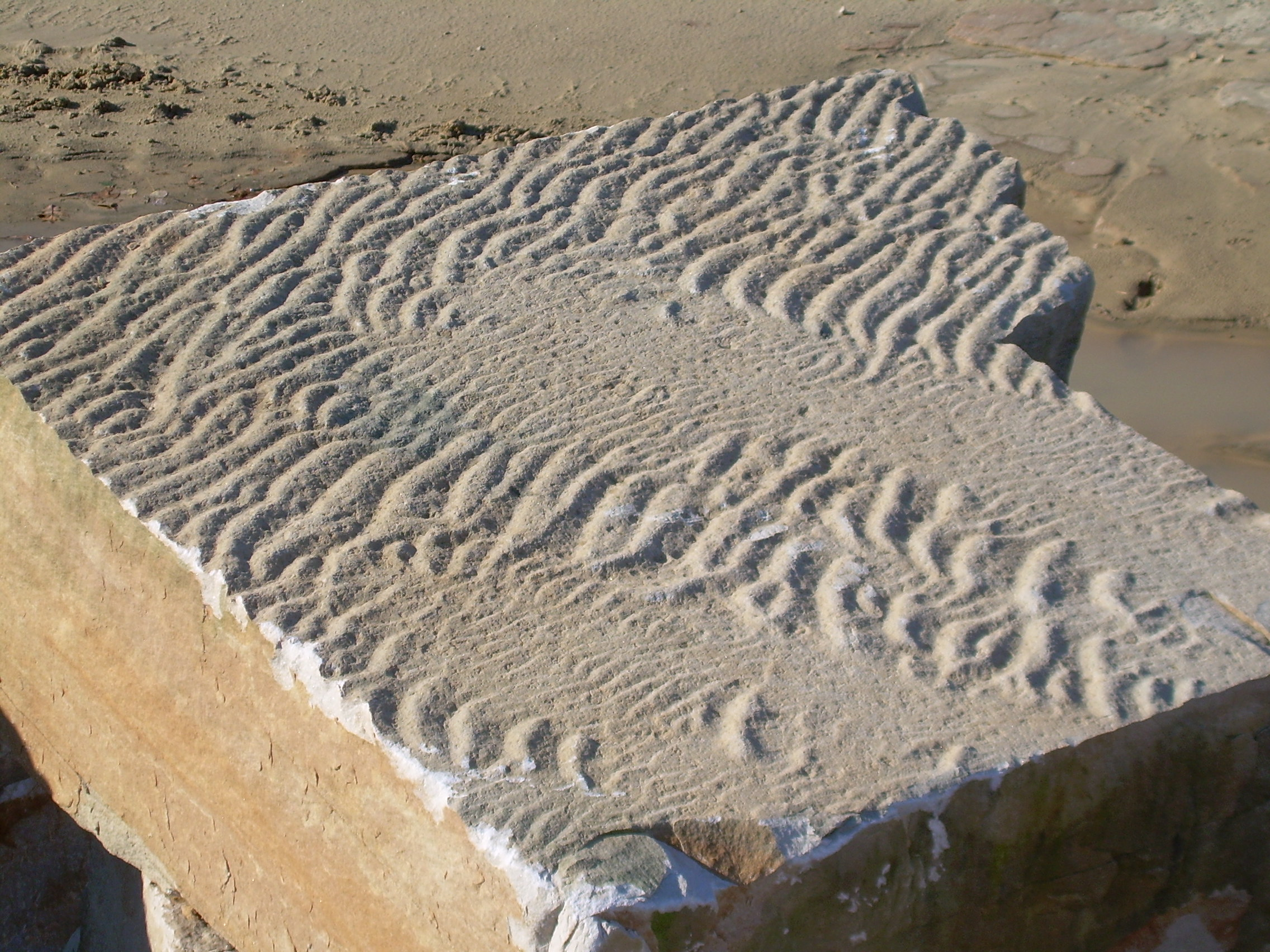
Ripple marks are exceptionally distinct on the surfaces of many layers at Blackberry Hill.

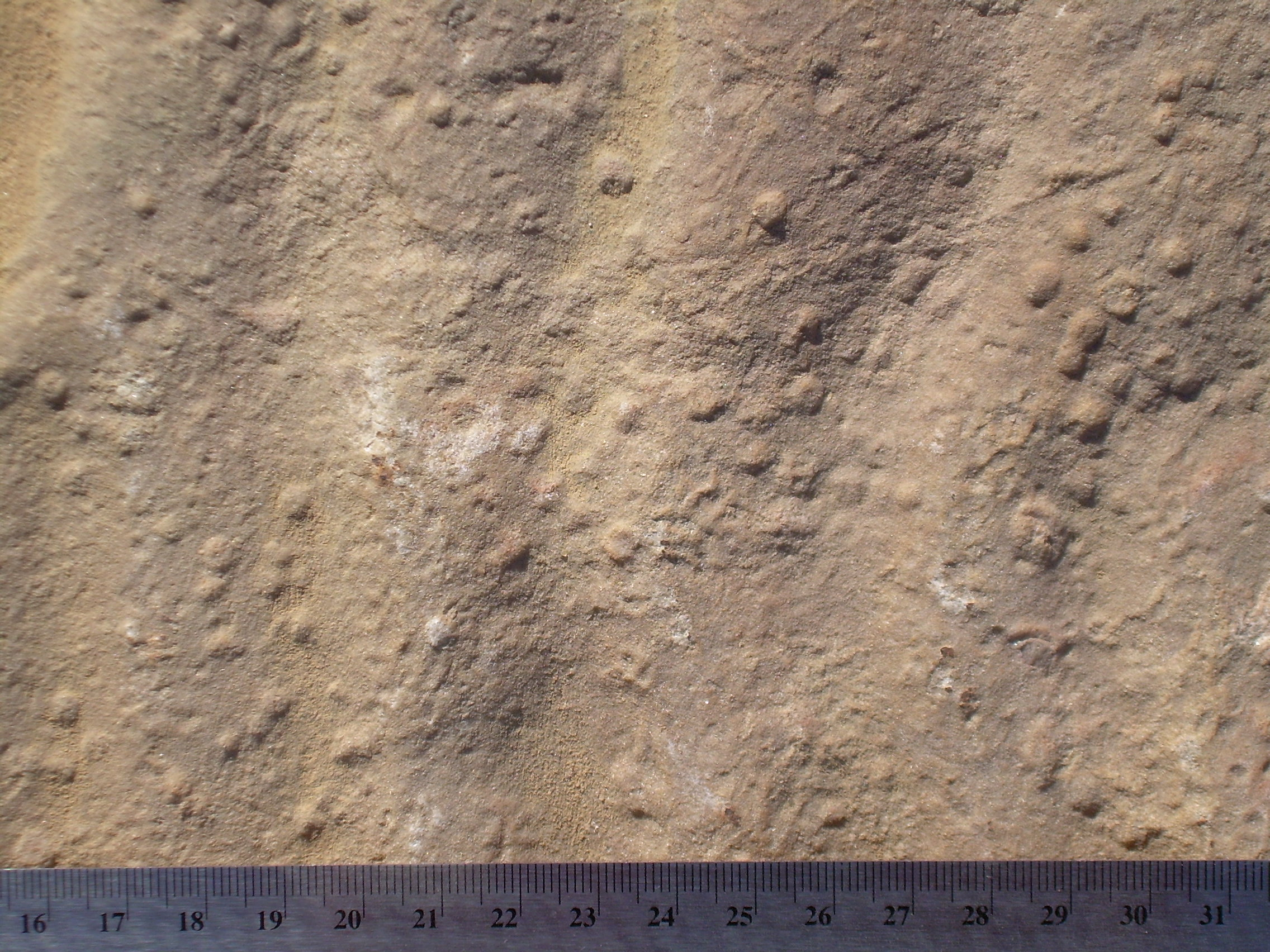
Sand stromatolites, such as these encrusting a ripple marked surface, are common sedimentary structures associated with microbial activity.

== Significance ==
Among the many paleontological discoveries thus far made at Blackberry Hill are the following:

- The first body fossils, and therefore the identity, of one of the first animals to walk on land.
- The only fossils that link those animals with their trackways.
- Body fossils of what may be the first phyllocarid with well preserved legs.
- Identification of the maker of Protichnites trackways after over 150 years of speculation.
- The largest concentrations of fossilized, stranded scyphozoans (i.e., jellyfish).
- What may be the first mating behavior in the fossil record.

The largest, most productive quarry is still in operation, thereby revealing fresh surfaces and the potential for new discoveries on a continuing basis.

== Biota ==
Sedimentary structures associated with biofilms and microbial mats are the only evidence of non-animal life at Blackberry Hill, as is the case elsewhere in this pre-embryophyte period in the history of Earth's life on land. The animal life of Blackberry Hill was, however, represented by several kinds of macrofossils, all preserved as three-dimensional casts or impressions, including:

- Mosineia macnaughtoni– These large (up to 10+ cm in length) arthropods, apparently having paddle or oar-like appendages, along with another genus from similar-aged strata of Quebec, have been identified as the oldest euthycarcinoids in the fossil record and some of the first animals to walk on land. It is thus far known from only three exoskeletons preserved ventral-side-up, all lacking the heads and carapaces. There is fossil evidence for two additional reasons for Mosineia's forays on land: coming ashore to avoid predators while it mated and laid its eggs; traveling back to water to avoid desiccation after being stranded on the beach.
- Arenosicaris inflata– This smaller arthropod (up to approximately 5 cm in length), more common than Mosineia (over 40 specimens to date), is one of the oldest members of the Phyllocarida. Disarticulated or splayed carapaces have been found in addition to essentially complete exoskeletons; however, the head is poorly known. Limbs, which are rarely fossilized in phyllocarids, are typically preserved in the A. inflata specimens.
- Scyphozoan medusae – Most of these are dome-shaped fossils, usually represented as body cavity infillings formed as the stranded animals pumped their bodies in an attempt to escape, and in so doing, ingested sand. Being composed mainly of water, scyphozoans rarely fossilize; however, they are found by the hundreds on some surfaces of one Blackberry Hill quarry. The size of these fossils is also noteworthy; some specimens have achieved a diameter of 95 cm, making them the largest scyphozoan fossils on record.
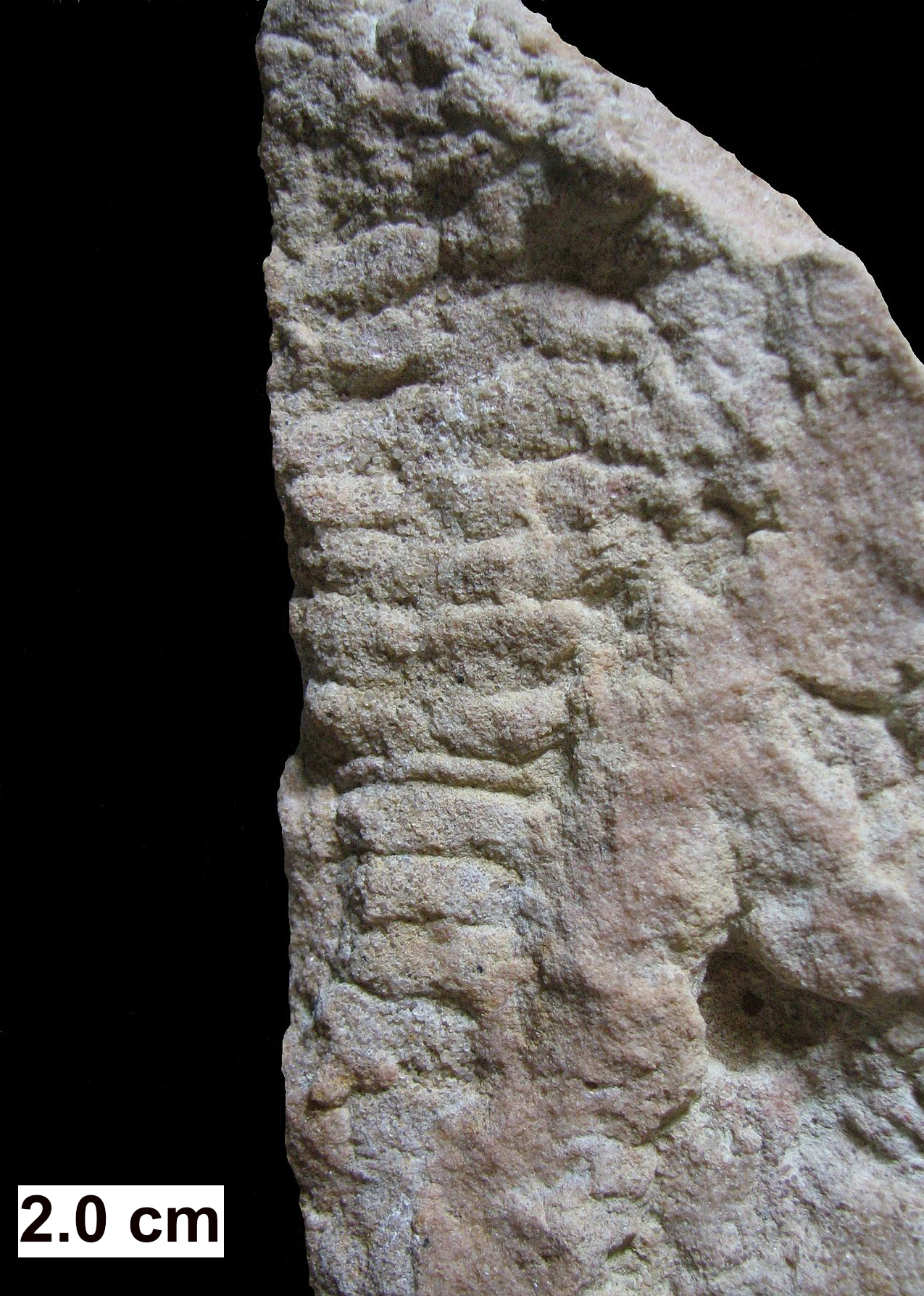
The euthycarcinoid, Mosineia macnaughtoni---the presumed maker of some of the Protichnites at Blackberry Hill.

Carapace of the phyllocarid, Arenosicaris inflata. Splayed carapace is about 3 cm wide across both valves.

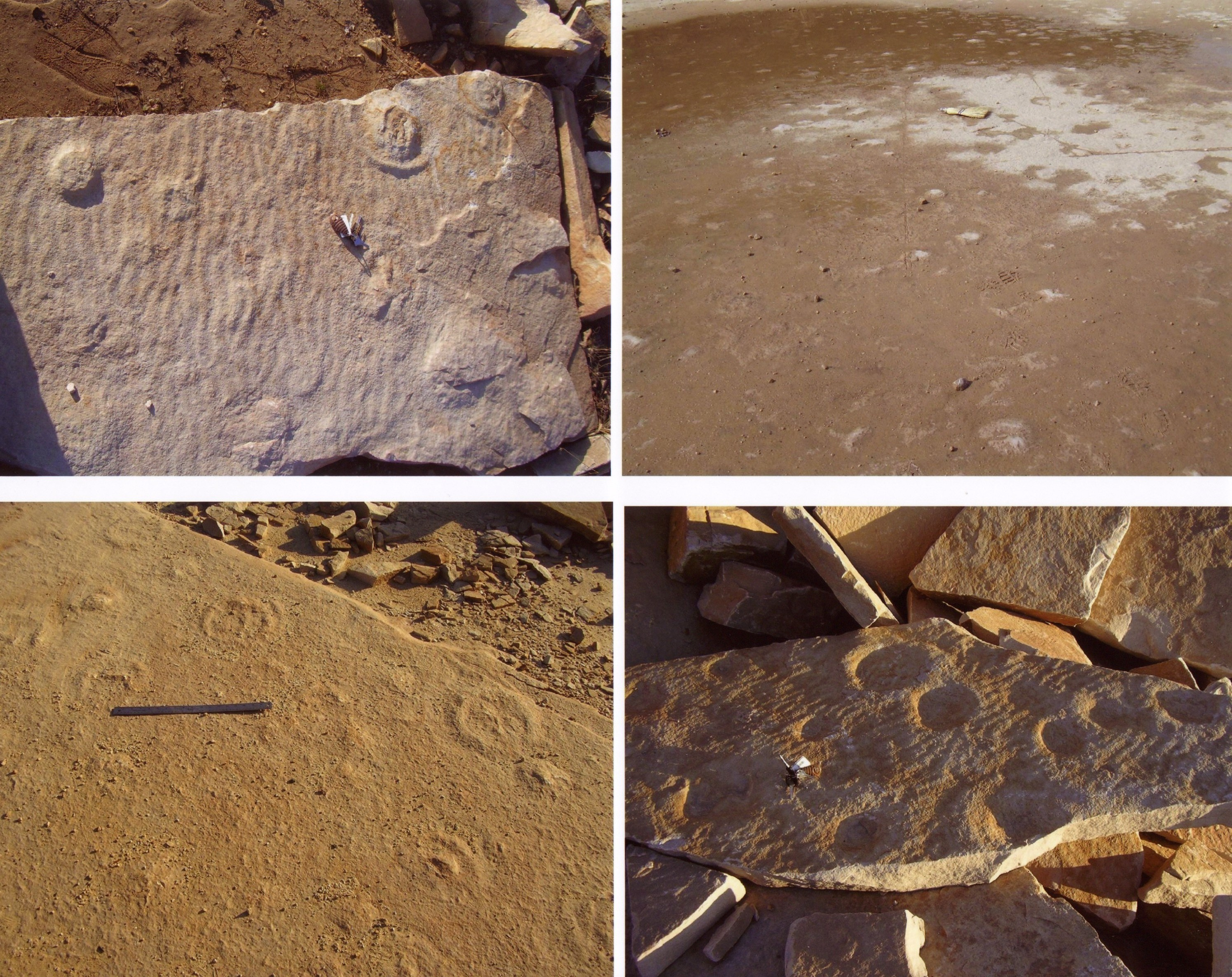
Stranded scyphozoans (jellyfish) in a partially flooded quarry. Due to the flat, horizontal bedding at this quarry, the scyphozoans shown in the background in the top/right photo are seen protruding above the water's surface.

== Trace fossils ==
- Protichnites – These trackways (up to 8 cm wide at Blackberry Hill) are characterized by two parallel rows of paired footprints, often in sets, and a medial furrow or series of medial impressions, presumably from a dragging or touching tail. The maker of Protichnites was conjectural since 1852, when Sir Richard Owen, the pioneering British anatomist and paleontologist who coined the term “dinosauria,” first named and described them based on material from equivalent strata of Quebec. Fossils from Blackberry Hill named P. eremita, found over 150 years later, solved the mystery by eventually revealing that at least some Protichnites were likely produced by the euthycarcinoid Mosineia macnaughtoni. P. eremita was originally interpreted to have been the product of an arthropod with the assistance of a mollusk shell that it used in hermit crab-style behavior.
- Diplichnites – These trackways at Blackberry Hill often resemble Protichnites, except they lack medial markings. They may have been made by the same animal(s) that produced Protichnites, based on individual trackways having medial furrows that appear and disappear as the animal travelled. It has been suggested that some Diplichnites are undertracks, whereby the animal walked on the top layer of sand, but only the tips of its appendages reached the underlying layer. In these cases, the top layer might then exhibit Protichnites due to the tail that dragged on the surface, and the bottom layer would result in the furrow-less Diplichnites. It is possible that some Diplichnites were produced by trilobites or unknown arthropods, but no fossils of trilobites have been found thus far at Blackberry Hill.
- Climactichnites – These distinctive trace fossils, up to 14 cm in width and resembling tire tracks, are the most conspicuous trails at Blackberry Hill, literally covering large surfaces of certain strata. Three ichnospecies are found: C. wilsoni, C. youngi, and C. blackberriensis. Their maker was likely a large, slug-like mollusk. Occasionally the resting trace, Musculopodus, is found at one end of a C. wilsoni. It has been speculated that the animal may have remained burrowed in the sediment in the daytime to avoid desiccation from the sunlight, and emerged at night to feed on the near-shore and on-shore microbial mats; however, there is no direct fossil evidence of grazing at Blackberry Hill, such as fossilized fecal pellets or strands.
- Other trace fossils – A variety of less conspicuous trace fossils is common at Blackberry Hill. The resting trace Rusophycus, bilobate linear traces similar to Cruziana and Aulichnites, and ropelike traces are sometimes found in close association with Arenosicaris inflata and are believed to result mainly from the burrowing activity of that phyllocarid.Additional traces include Siskemia isp., Diplopodichnus isp., Stiallia pilosa, and an impression that resembles those sometimes produced by polychaete worms.
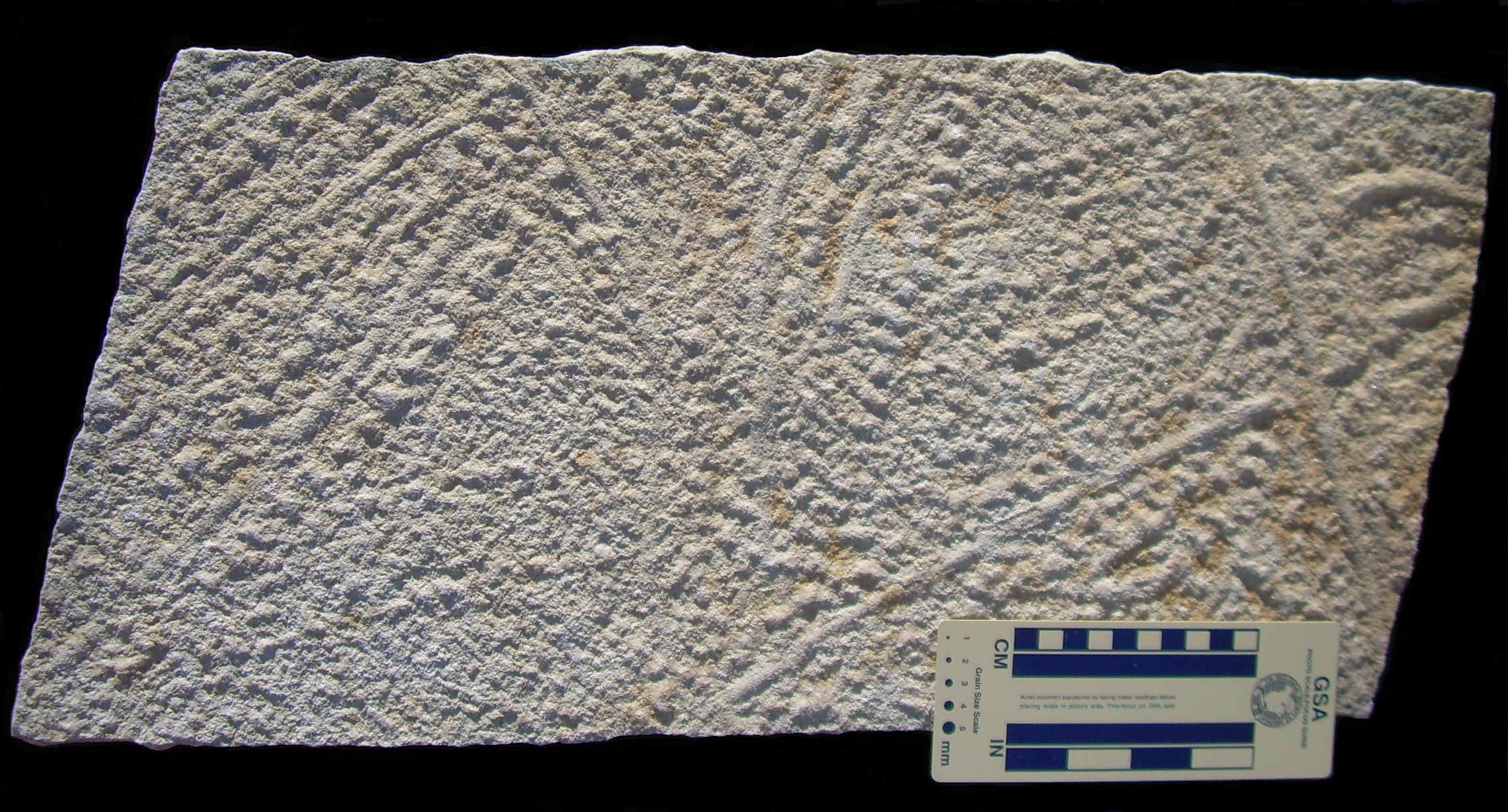
The trackways Protichnites with particularly distinct medial furrows. Distinctness of the furrows and footprints is believed to be influenced by substrate characteristics, whether the trackways were produced under water or on land, and other factors.

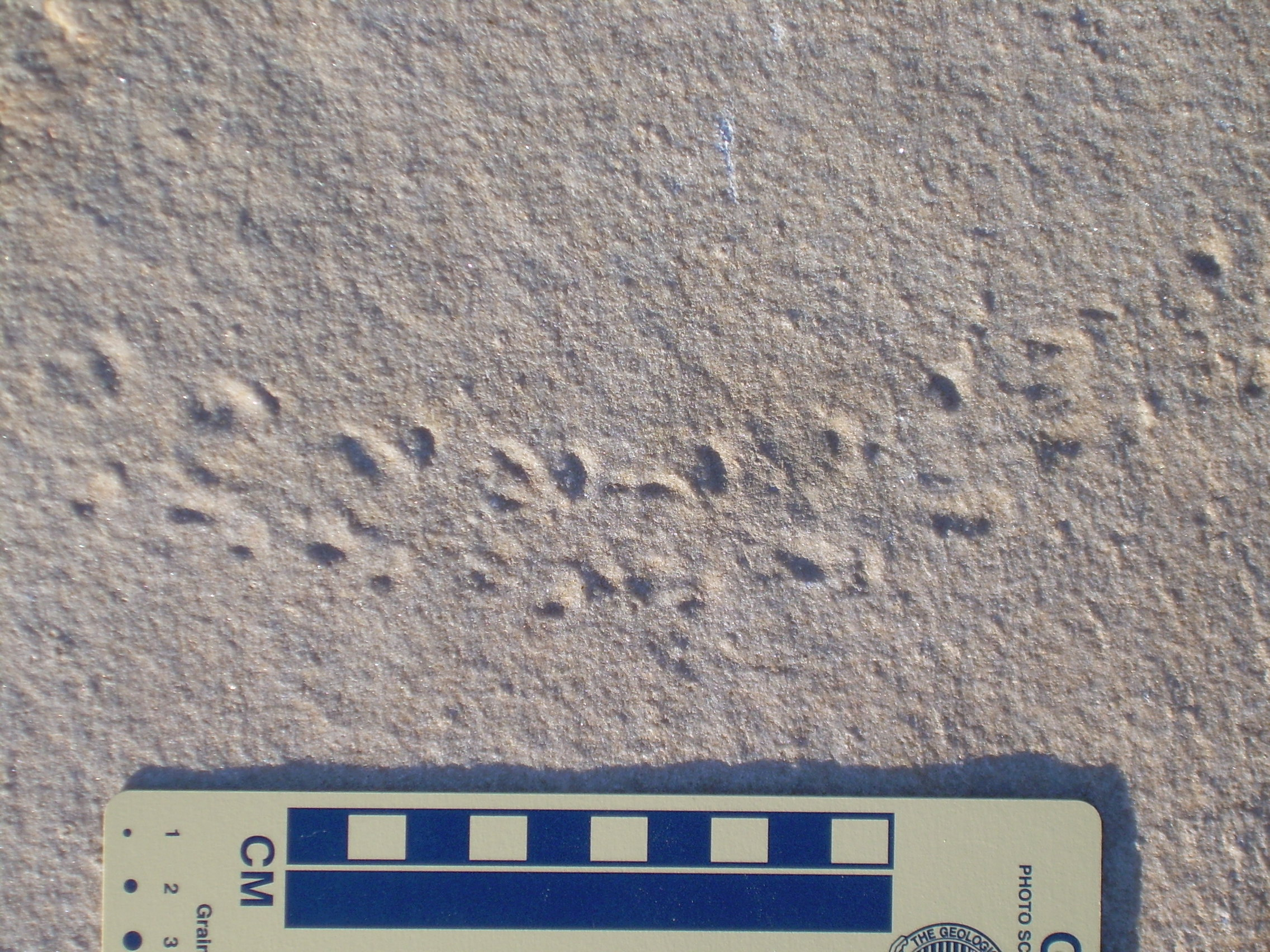
The trackways, Diplichnites, possibly an undertrack.

Climactichnites wilsoni, the surface trails from a large, slug-like mollusk. In this sprawling example, the many trackways are seen overlapping each other. These examples are about 10 cm wide.

The trail Climactichnites blackberriensis, from the Cambrian of central Wisconsin. Image credit: K.C. Gass, 2025.

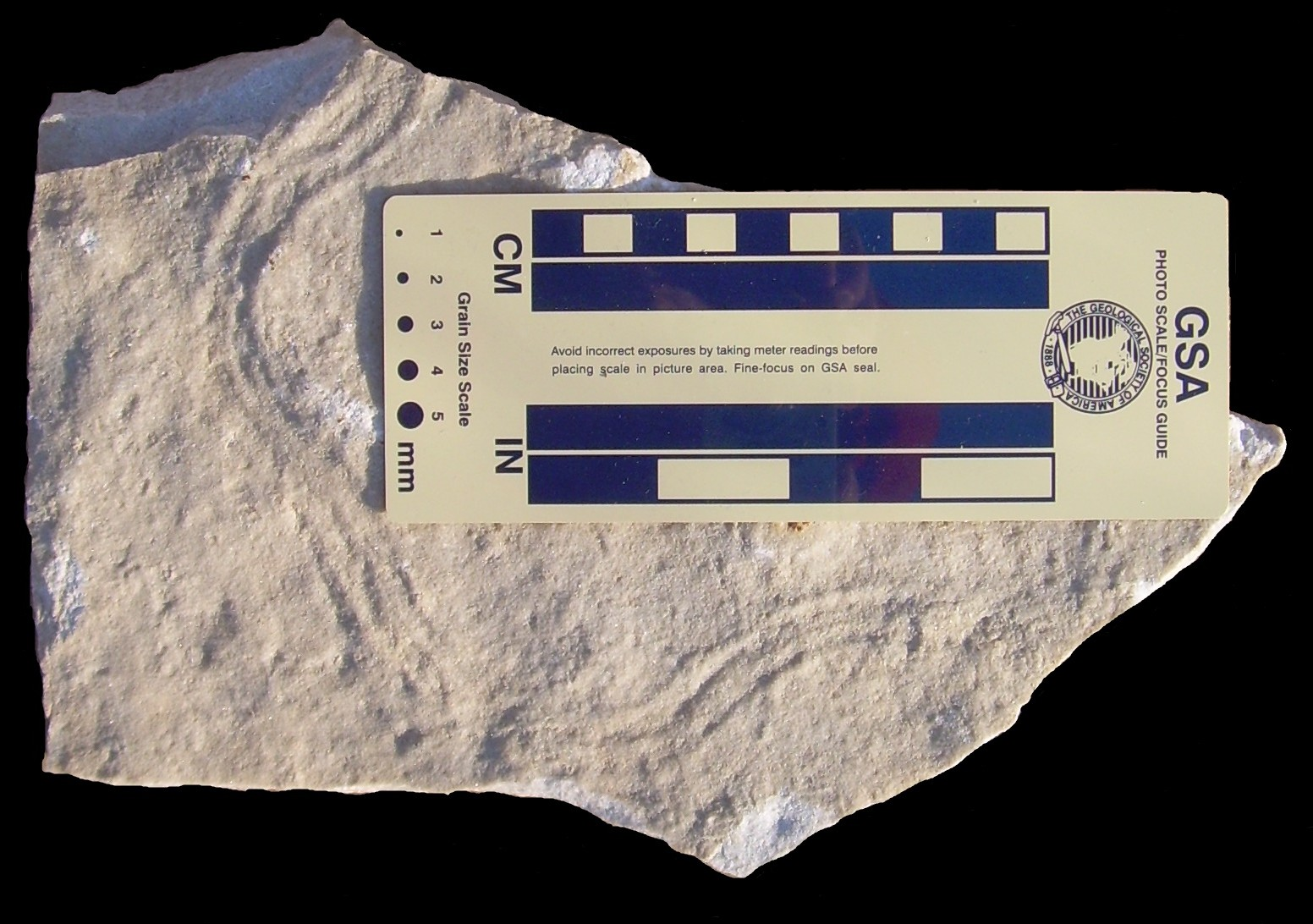
Trace resembling Aulichnites, possibly from the phyllocarid Arenosicaris inflata.

Impression resembling those produced by polychaete worms. Trace is 8.5 cm long.]

== Bibliography ==
- Braddy, S. J.; K. C. Gass & T. C. Gass (2022). "Fossils of Blackberry Hill, USA: the first animals on land, 500 million years ago". Geology Today. 38: 25–31. doi:10.1111/gto.12379.
- Collette, J. H.; K. C. Gass & J. W. Hagadorn (2012). "Protichnites eremita unshelled? Experimental model-based neoichnology and new evidence for a euthycarcinoid affinity for this ichnospecies". Journal of Paleontology. 86 (3): 442–454. doi:10.1666/11-056.1. S2CID 129234373.
- Collette, J. H. & J. W. Hagadorn (2010). "Three-dimensionally preserved arthropods from Cambrian Lagerstatten of Quebec and Wisconsin". Journal of Paleontology. 84 (4): 646–667. doi:10.1666/09-075.1. S2CID 130064618.
- Collette, J. H.; J. W. Hagadorn & M. A. LaCelle (2010). "Dead in their tracks: Cambrian arthropods and their traces from intertidal sandstones of Quebec and Wisconsin". PALAIOS. 25 (8): 475–486. doi:10.2110/palo.2009.p09-134r. S2CID 130051546.
- Gass, Kenneth C.; Noffke, Nora (2026). "New ichnotaxa from the tidal flat facies of the Cambrian Elk Mound Group, Wisconsin, USA". Journal of Paleontology. 100 (1): 1–15. doi:10.1017/jpa.2026.10225.
- Getty, P. R. & J. W. Hagadorn (2008). "Reinterpretation of Climactichnites Logan 1860 to include subsurface burrows, and erection of Musculopodus for resting traces of the trailmaker". Journal of Paleontology. 82 (6): 1161–1172. doi:10.1666/08-004.1.
- Getty, P. R. & J. W. Hagadorn (2009). "Palaeobiology of the Climactichnites tracemaker". Palaeontology. 52 (4): 753–778. doi:10.1111/j.1475-4983.2009.00875.x.
- Goldring, R. & A. Seilacher (1971). "Limulid undertracks and their sedimentological implications". Neues Jahrbuch für Geologie und Paläontologie, Abhandlungen. 137: 422–442.
- Hagadorn, J. W. & E. S. Belt (2008). "Stranded in upstate New York: Cambrian scyphomedusae from the Potsdam Sandstone". PALAIOS. 23 (7): 424–441. doi:10.2110/palo.2006.p06-104r. S2CID 129933062.
- Hagadorn, J. W.; R. H. Dott & D. Damrow (2002). "Stranded on an Upper Cambrian Shoreline: Medusae from Central Wisconsin". Geology. 30 (2): 147–150. doi:10.1130/0091-7613(2002)030<0147:SOALCS>2.0.CO;2.
- Hagadorn, J. W. & A. Seilacher (2009). "Hermit arthropods 500 million years ago?". Geology. 37 (4): 295–298. doi:10.1130/G25181A.1.
- Hoxie, C. T. (2005). "Late Cambrian arthropod trackways in subaerially exposed environments: Incentives to simplify a problematic ichnogenus". Unpublished B.A. Thesis: 1–89.
- MacNaughton, R. B.; J. M. Cole; R. W. Dalrymple; S. J. Braddy; D. E. G. Briggs & T. D. Lukie (2002). "First steps on land:Arthropod trackways in Cambrian-Ordovician eolian sandstones, Canada". Geology. 30 (5): 391–394. doi:10.1130/0091-7613(2002)030<0391:FSOLAT>2.0.CO;2. S2CID 130821454.
- Ortega-Hernandez, J.; Tremewan, J. & Braddy, S. J. (2010). "Euthycarcinoids". Geology Today. 26 (5): 195–198. doi:10.1111/j.1365-2451.2010.00770.x. S2CID 247664753.
- Ostrom, M. E. (1966). Cambrian Stratigraphy of Western Wisconsin. Wisconsin Geological and Natural History Survey.
- Owen, R. (1852). "Description of the impressions and footprints of the Protichnites from the Potsdam sandstone of Canada". Geological Society of London Quarterly Journal. 8 (1–2): 214–225. doi:10.1144/GSL.JGS.1852.008.01-02.26. S2CID 130712914.
- Schieber, J.; Bose, P. K.; Eriksson, P. G.; Banerjee, S.; Sarkar, S.; Altermann, W.; Catuneau, O. (2007). Atlas of Microbial Mat Features Preserved within the Clastic Rock Record. Elsevier. pp. 53–71.
- Seilacher, A. (2007). Trace Fossil Analysis. New York, New York: Springer. p. 226.
- Seilacher, A. (2008). "Biomats, biofilms, and bioglue as preservational agents for arthropod trackways" (PDF). Palaeogeography, Palaeoclimatology, Palaeoecology. 270 (3–4): 252–257. doi:10.1016/j.palaeo.2008.07.011.
- Seilacher, A. & J. W. Hagadorn (2010). "Early molluscan evolution: Evidence from the trace fossil record". PALAIOS. 25 (9): 565–575. doi:10.2110/palo.2009.p09-079r. S2CID 129360547.
- Yochelson, E. L. & M. A. Fedonkin (1993). "Paleobiology of Climactichnites, an enigmatic Late Cambrian fossil". Smithsonian Contributions to Paleobiology. 74 (74): 1–74. doi:10.5479/si.00810266.74.1.
- Young, G. A. & J. W. Hagadorn (2010). "The fossil record of cnidarian medusa". Palaeoworld. 19 (3–4): 212–221. doi:10.1016/j.palwor.2010.09.014.
