= Gadway Sandstone Pavement Barrens =

- Gadway Sandstone Pavement Barrens
- Location within New York
- Nearest city: Mooers
- Coordinates: 44.9603°N 73.5872°W
- Area: 533 acres (216 ha)
- Governing body: The Nature Conservancy
- Website: www.nature.org/en-us/get-involved/how-to-help/places-we-protect/adirondacks-gadway-sandstone-pavement-barrens/

The Gadway Sandstone Pavement Barrens includes and area of Potsdam Sandstone in Clinton County New York. This location is one of less than 20 Sandstone Pavement Barrens in the world. The site is administered by The Nature Conservancy and used as a research site.
