= Paleontological Journal =

- Discipline: Paleontology
- Language: English, Russian
- Edited by: Alexei Yu. Rozanov

Publication details
- History: 1959–present
- Publisher: MAIK Nauka/Interperiodica in collaboration with Springer Science+Business Media
- Frequency: Monthly
- Impact factor: 0.454 (2011)

Standard abbreviations
- ISO 4: Paleontol. J.

Indexing
- Paleontological Journal
- ISSN: 0031-0301 (print); 1555-6174 (web)
- LCCN: 72015751
- OCLC no.: 1639478
- Paleontologicheskii Zhurnal
- ISSN: 0031-031X

Links
- Journal page at Springer website (articles from 2006 onwards)

Paleontological Journal (Russian: Палеонтологический Журнал, romanized: Paleontologicheskii Zhurnal) is a monthly peer-reviewed Russian journal of paleontology established in 1959. It focuses on the paleontology and the fossil records of Eastern Europe and Asia. Articles are published simultaneously in Russian and English.

The journal is edited by Alexei Yu. Rozanov and published by MAIK Nauka/Interperiodica.

== Editors-in-Chief ==
- Acad. Yuri A. Orlov (1959–1966)
- Dr. Vasily E. Ruzhentsev (1967–1978)
- Acad. Leonid P. Tatarinov (1978–1988, 1994–2001)
- Dr. Igor S. Barskov (1988–1993)
- Acad. Alexei Yu. Rozanov (since 2001)

== Abstracting and indexing ==
Paleonotological Journal is indexed and abstracted in:

- Academic OneFile
- Aquatic Sciences and Fisheries Abstracts
- Biological Abstracts
- BIOSIS Previews
- CAB Abstracts
- CAB International
- CSA/ProQuest
- Current Contents/Physical, Chemical and Earth Sciences
- EMBiology
- Gale
- GeoRef
- Global Health
- Science Citation Index Expanded
- Scopus
- Summon by Serial Solutions

According to the Journal Citation Reports, the journal has a 2011 impact factor of 0.454.

== See also ==
- Palaeoworld
