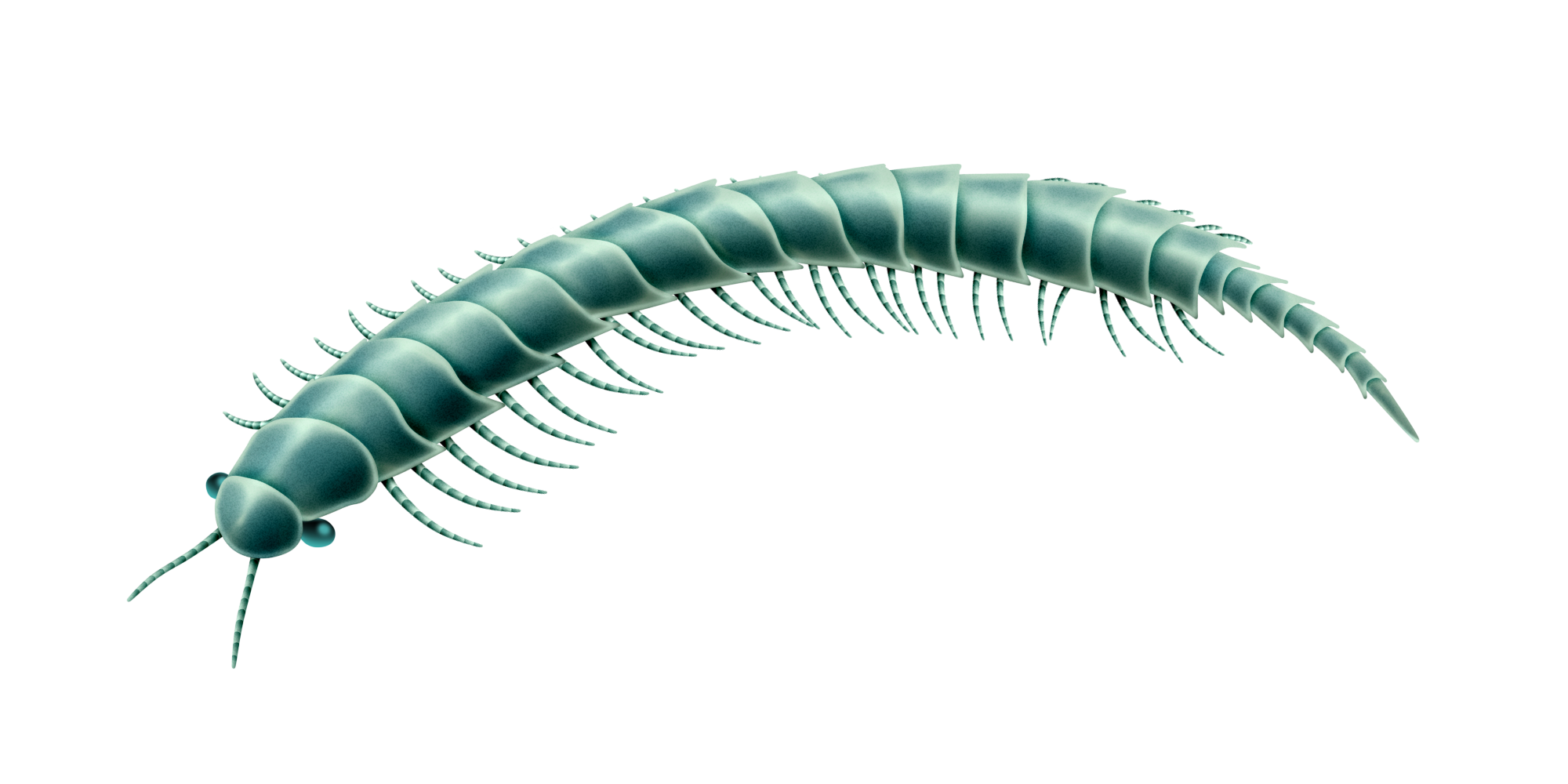
- Artistic reconstruction of Sottyxerxes

Scientific classification
- Kingdom: Animalia
- Phylum: Arthropoda
- Subclass: †Euthycarcinoidea
- Genus: †Sottyxerxes; Schram et al., 1982
- Species: †S. multiplex

Binomial name
- †Sottyxerxes multiplex Schram et al., 1982

= Sottyxerxes =

Sottyxerxes Temporal range: Carboniferous, Stephanian

Extinct genus of arthropod

Sottyxerxes is an extinct genus of euthycarcinoid arthropod from the Carboniferous (Stephanian stage) Montceau-les-Mines lagerstätte in France. It contains one species: Sottyxerxes multiplex.

== Discovery and naming ==
The genus was originally described and named by Schram et al. in 1982 with two species: S. multiplex from the Stephanian Montceau-les-Mines lagerstätte and S. pieckoae from the Westphalian Mazon Creek. However, S. pieckoae was later placed in the new genus Pieckoxerxes by Starobogatov in 1988.

S. multiplex was described on the basis of 11 specimens. In 2008, Racheboeuf et al. redescribed the species with 49 new specimens, including some three-dimensionally preserved fossils.

The genus name honours the Sotty family, prominent collectors of Montceau-les-Mines fossils. The specific name multiplex comes from Latin and means "manifold" or "multiple", referring to the numerous diplosegments.

== Description ==
Diagrammatic reconstruction

The total body length reaches about 35 mm (1.4 in). The head is rounded, 2.4 mm (0.094 in) long, and is composed of two sclerites: the anterior cephalic tergite and the larger posterior cephalic tergite. The ventral face of the cephalic region carries two unpaired convex plates, which might represent the labrum identified in other euthycarcinoids. There are 14 preabdominal tergites and six postabdominal somites. The body is terminated by a pointed telson.

== Ecology ==
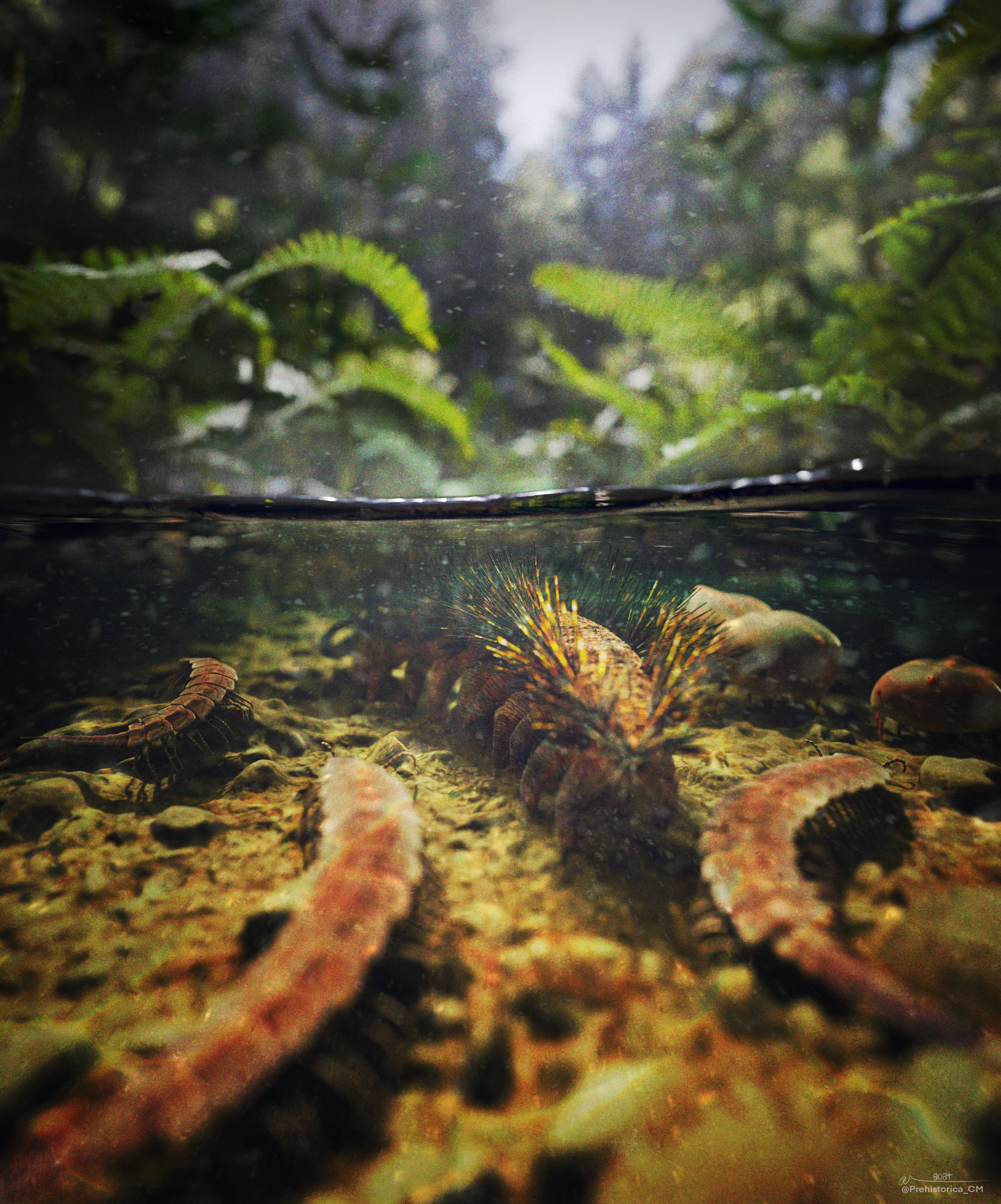
Artistic reconstruction of the Montceau-les-Mines palaeoenvironment with the xiphosuran Alanops on the right, the lobopodian Palaeocampa in the middle, and three Sottyxerxes around Palaeocampa.

The Montceau-les-Mines lagerstätte is widely accepted to have been a freshwater intermontane environment. Sottyxerxes has no setae, subtriangular podomeres, and shows no swimming adaptations, which suggests that it simply walked along the bottom. It lived alongside the other euthycarcinoid Schramixerxes gerem.
