= Antarcticarcinus =

Antarcticarcinus Temporal range: Gzhelian–Asselian

Scientific classification
- Kingdom: Animalia
- Phylum: Arthropoda
- Subclass: †Euthycarcinoidea
- Genus: †Antarcticarcinus; Colette, Isbell & Miller, 2017
- Species: †A. pagoda

Binomial name
- †Antarcticarcinus pagoda Colette, Isbell & Miller, 2017

Extinct genus of euthycarcinoid

Antarcticarcinus is an extinct genus of late Carboniferous (Gzhelian) to early Permian (Asselian) euthycarcinoids from the Pagoda Formation of Antarctica. The genus contains a single species, Antarcticarcinus pagoda.

== Description ==
Antarcticarcinus was at least 4 cm long (the most complete fossil only preserves the head and postabdomen). The genus is remarkable for the unusual "wings" on its first preabdominal segment, which immediately distinguish it from any other euthycarcinoid. It is also one of the few euthycarcinoids which deviates from the typical body shape, alongside Arthrogyrinus which shows a particularly flattened tail. The rest of the body is quite typical for a euthycarcinoid, with eyes near the tip of the head and possible square-shaped mandibles, although the head may be composed of two sclerites. At least three to four dorsal tergites are preserved, with the first bearing the aforementioned large lateral processes. At least five ventral sternites are preserved, with the first being much longer than the others. Limbs are also preserved, with them seemingly being uniramous and made of four to five box-like podomeres. A more gracile disarticulated limb has also been recorded, which may be further down the preabdomen, with a possible antenna preserved on the head. No limb setae are known.

== Etymology ==
Antarcticarcinus derives from the Greek karkinos meaning "crab", and Antarctica, the location of the fossils. The species name pagoda derives from the Pagoda Formation where the fossils were found.
