= Potsdam Sandstone =

Geologic unit in eastern North America

- Stratigraphic range: Latest Guzhangian–Furongian
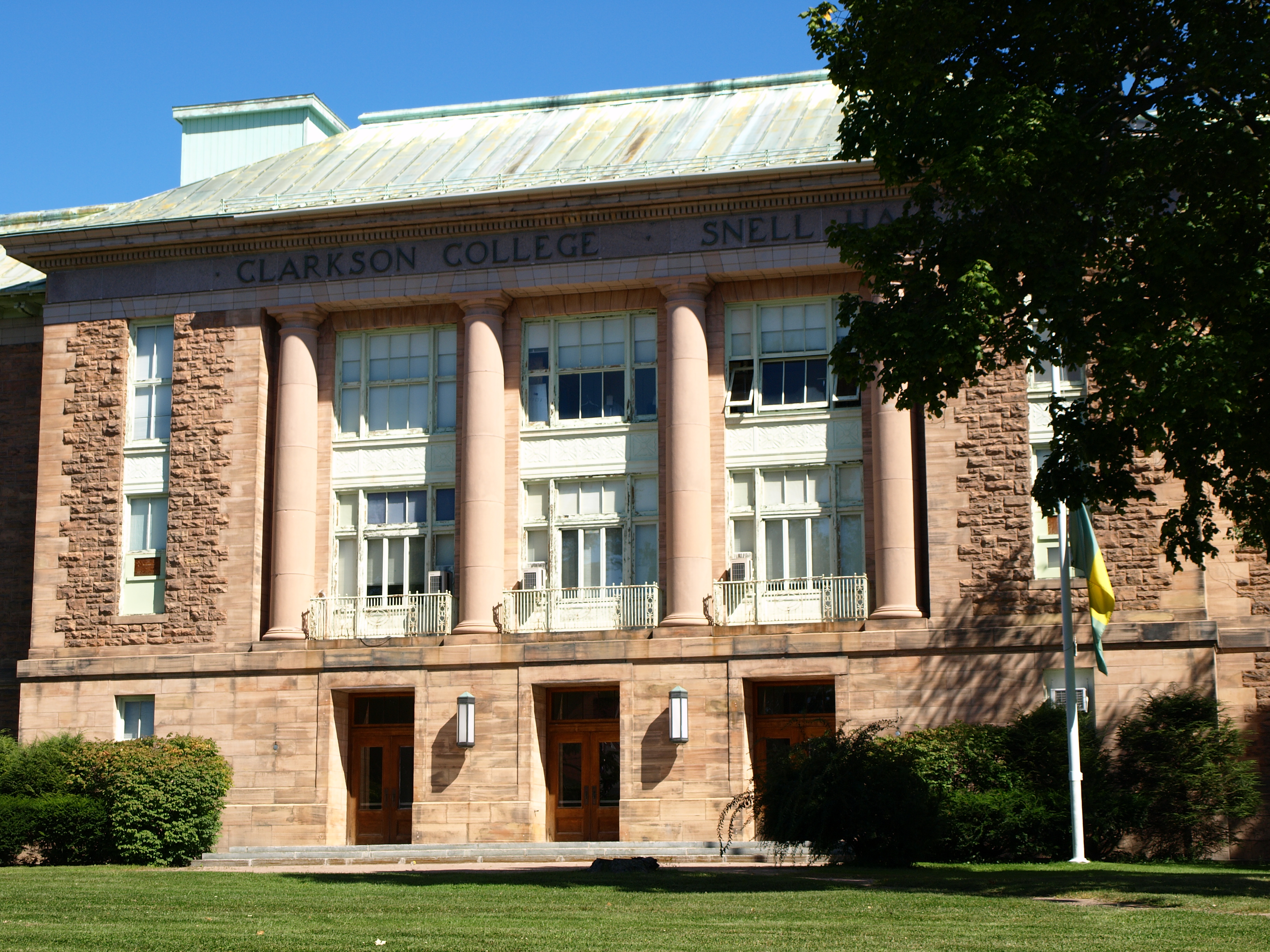
- Old Snell Hall at Clarkson University was built with Potsdam Sandstone.
- Type: Geological formation
- Sub-units: Cairnside Formation, Nepean Formation (Upper Cambrian); Covey Hill Formation (?Middle Cambrian); Mount Simon Sandstone
- Area: Eastern North America

Lithology
- Primary: Orthoquartzite
- Other: Conglomerates, local siltstone lenses

The Potsdam Sandstone, more formally known as the Potsdam Group, is a geologic unit of mid-to-late Cambrian age found in Northern New York and northern Vermont and Quebec and Ontario. A well-cemented sandstone of nearly pure quartz, in the 19th century it was widely used in construction and in refractory linings for iron furnaces.

== Name and type locality ==
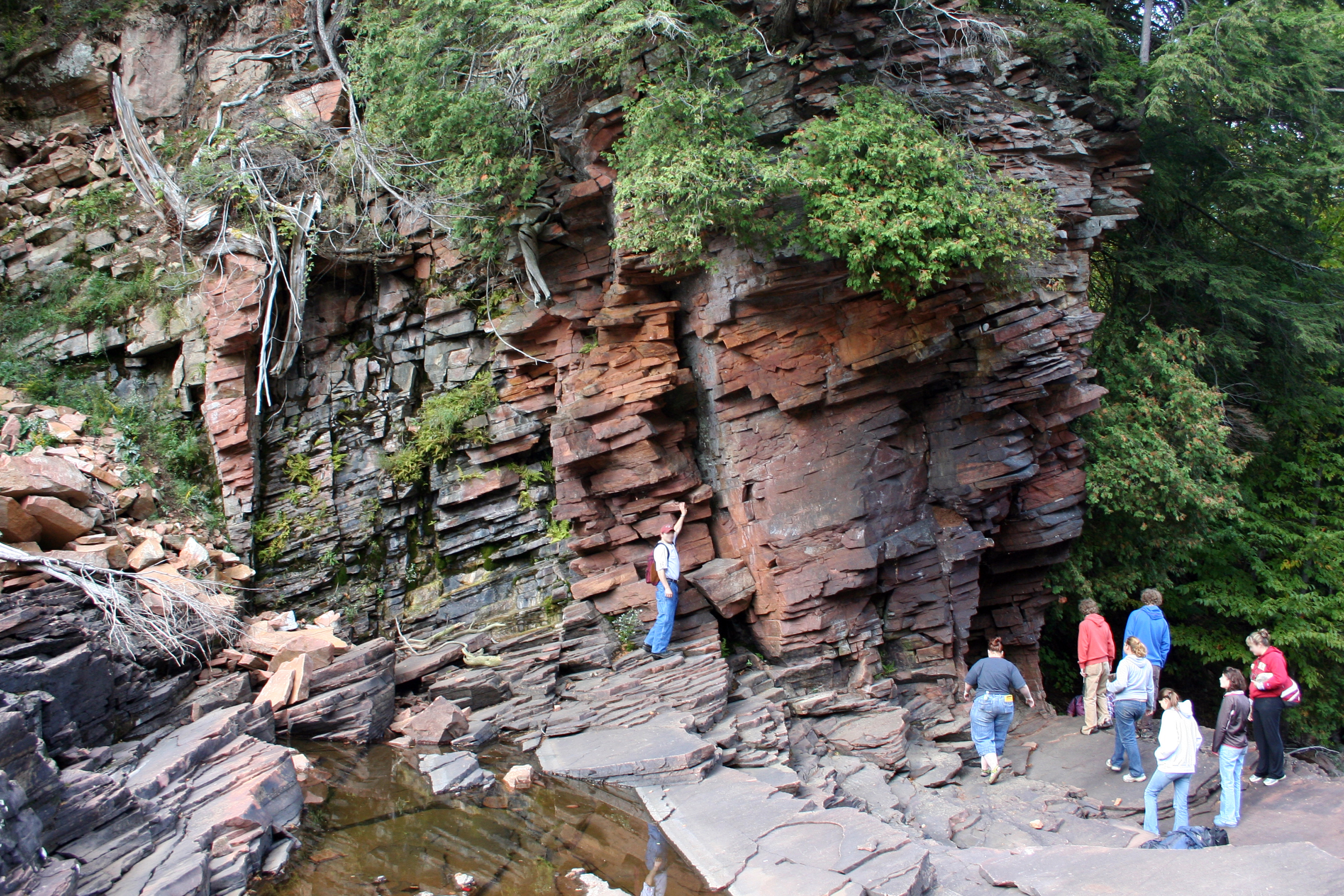
Potsdam Sandstone outcrop along the Raquette River

The Potsdam Sandstone is named for its type locality in Potsdam, New York, where in 1838 Ebenezer Emmons described it in outcrops along the Raquette River.

== Stratigraphic setting and lithology ==
The Potsdam Sandstone lies unconformably on a surface of Precambrian metamorphic rock. It is the earliest unit in the marine-transgressive sedimentary rock sequence deposited during the early Paleozoic as sea level rose to gradually inundate the craton of the paleocontinent of Laurentia. The rock, which is formed from sediments eroded off unvegetated terrestrial landscapes and deposited in near-shore coastal environments, consists almost entirely of sand-size quartz grains held together by quartz cement. It ranges in color from gray to tan, yellow, and red, with the colors imparted by small amounts of the red iron oxide mineral hematite, Fe_{2}O_{3}, and the yellow iron oxide mineral goethite, FeO(OH).

As sea level rose in the depositional environment, increasing amounts of carbonate minerals were deposited in the sediment, with the result that the unit grades upward into dolomitic sandstone in the upper Potsdam and then to sandy dolomite at the base of the overlying Theresa Formation.

== Geographic occurrence ==
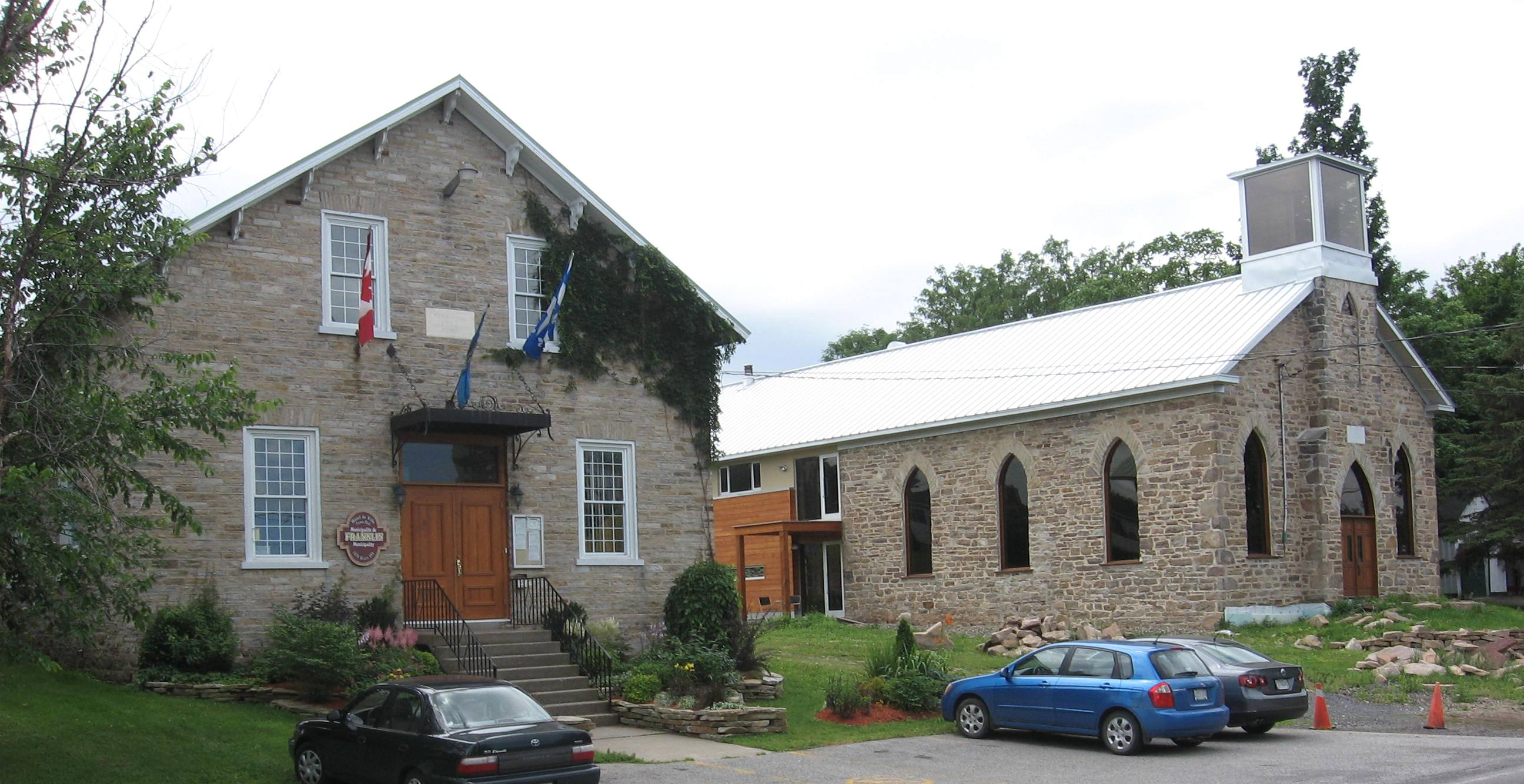
Potsdam sandstone in 19th-century institutional architecture at Franklin, Quebec

In New York state, the Potsdam is found primarily north and west of the Adirondack Mountains. Outcrop exposures of the Potsdam Sandstone occur throughout the Saint Lawrence lowlands, western Lake Champlain Valley, and northern Mohawk Valley. Ausable Chasm, near Plattsburgh, has a continuous exposure of a section more than 160 metres (520 ft) thick. The formation reaches its maximum thickness of about 450 metres (1,480 ft) in the northern Champlain lowland.

Potsdam sandstone has been quarried commercially in Nepean, Ontario and Covey Hill, Quebec.

== Uses in construction and industry ==
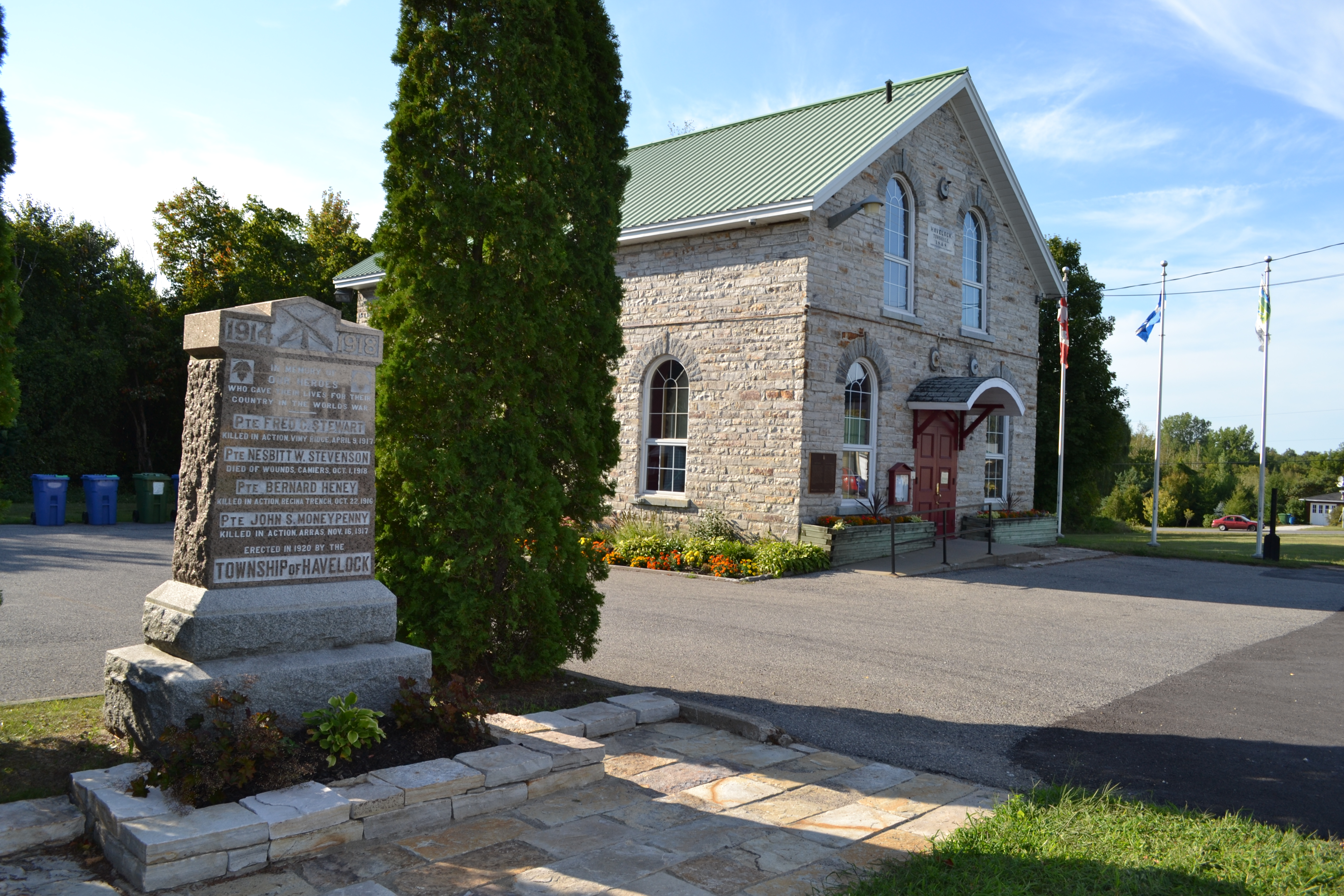
Havelock Town Hall, built from Potsdam sandstone quarried from Covey Hill, is a National Historic Site of Canada

In the 19th century, Potsdam Sandstone was highly regarded as a building material. There was extensive quarrying for Potsdam Sandstone in the Potsdam area, beginning in 1809. Properties of the rock that give it value as a building material include high compressive strength, attractive reddish coloring, and resistance to weathering. The rock also was said to be "soft and easy to carve" when freshly quarried but "extremely hard" and "weather-resistant" after exposure to the air, but modern geologists suggest that this is a misconception.

Local sandstone was used for many buildings in Potsdam, as well as for purposes such as gravestones and sidewalks.

Buildings in other cities constructed with this rock include portions of Canada's Parliament Buildings (original Centre Block and Library of Parliament) in Ottawa, and the Cathedral of All Saints in Albany, New York. Potsdam Sandstone and its stratigraphic equivalents also have been quarried for use as building stone at several sites in Quebec.

Potsdam Sandstone resists spalling when exposed to fire, making it highly suitable for use as a refractory for lining iron furnaces.

== Stratigraphic equivalents and related units ==
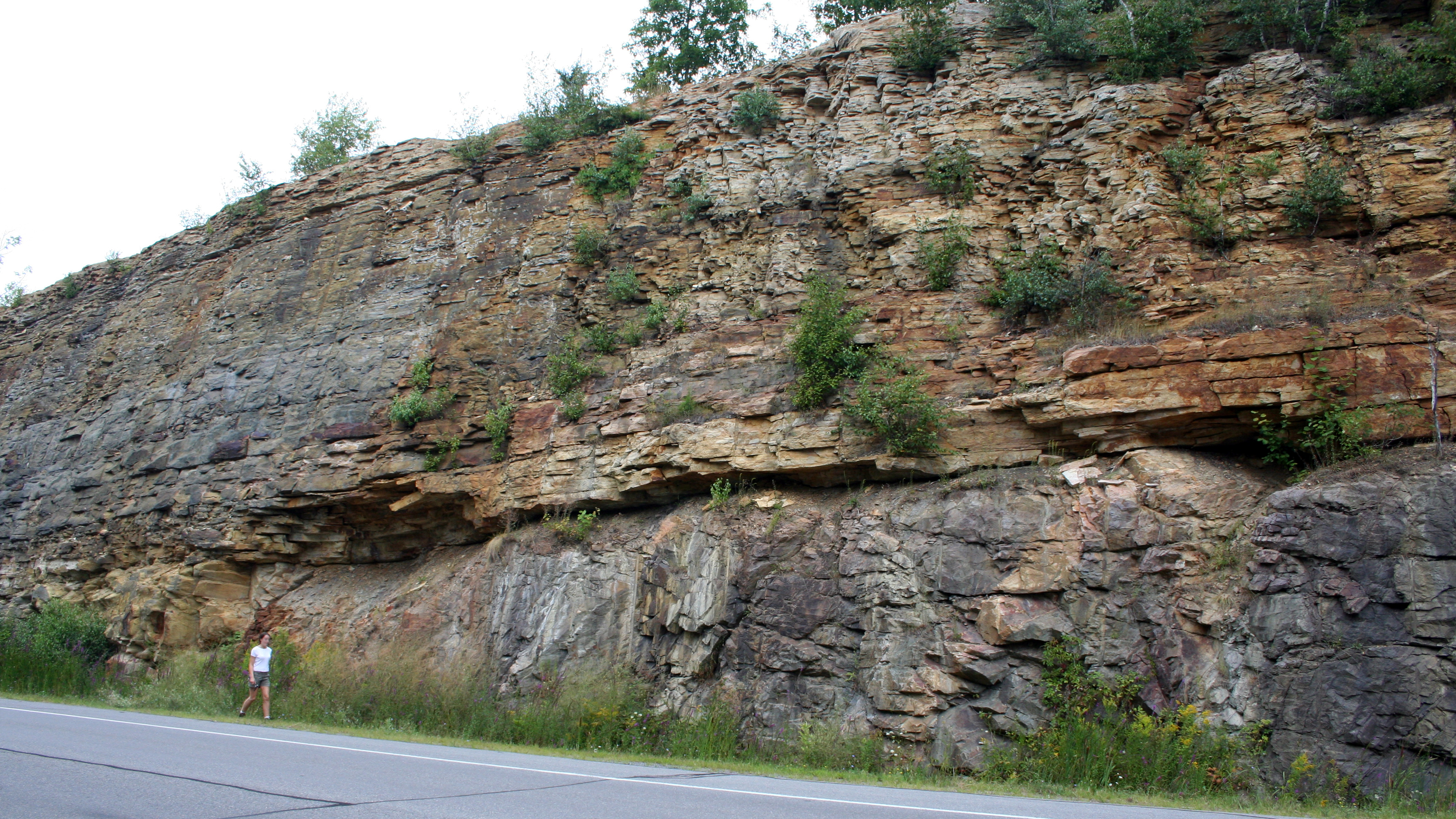
Unconformity at the base of the Potsdam Sandstone

Stratigraphically equivalent and lithologically similar sandstone extends across the international border into Canada, although stratigraphic boundaries and nomenclature can differ.

In Ontario, the Nepean Sandstone was formerly called "Potsdam" and is regarded as a stratigraphic equivalent to the Potsdam Sandstone. In Quebec, the Potsdam Group is recognized, consisting of the Covey Hill Formation and the Cairnside Formation, both of which are sandstones.

Historically the name "Potsdam sandstone" was also applied to various other North American sandstone bodies that directly overlie Precambrian crystalline rocks, including sandstones in Canada, Pennsylvania, Virginia, Iowa, Wisconsin, Minnesota, Michigan, and Indiana, and attempts were made to identify or correlate various rocks with the Potsdam formation. The basal Cambrian sandstone formation in much of the upper Mississippi Valley and southern Great Lakes region is now designated the Mount Simon Sandstone and is, in turn, assigned to the Potsdam Supergroup, which takes its name from the Potsdam Sandstone. Similar quartz arenite sandstone found in Wyoming was also identified historically as the "Potsdam sandstone."

== Paleontology ==
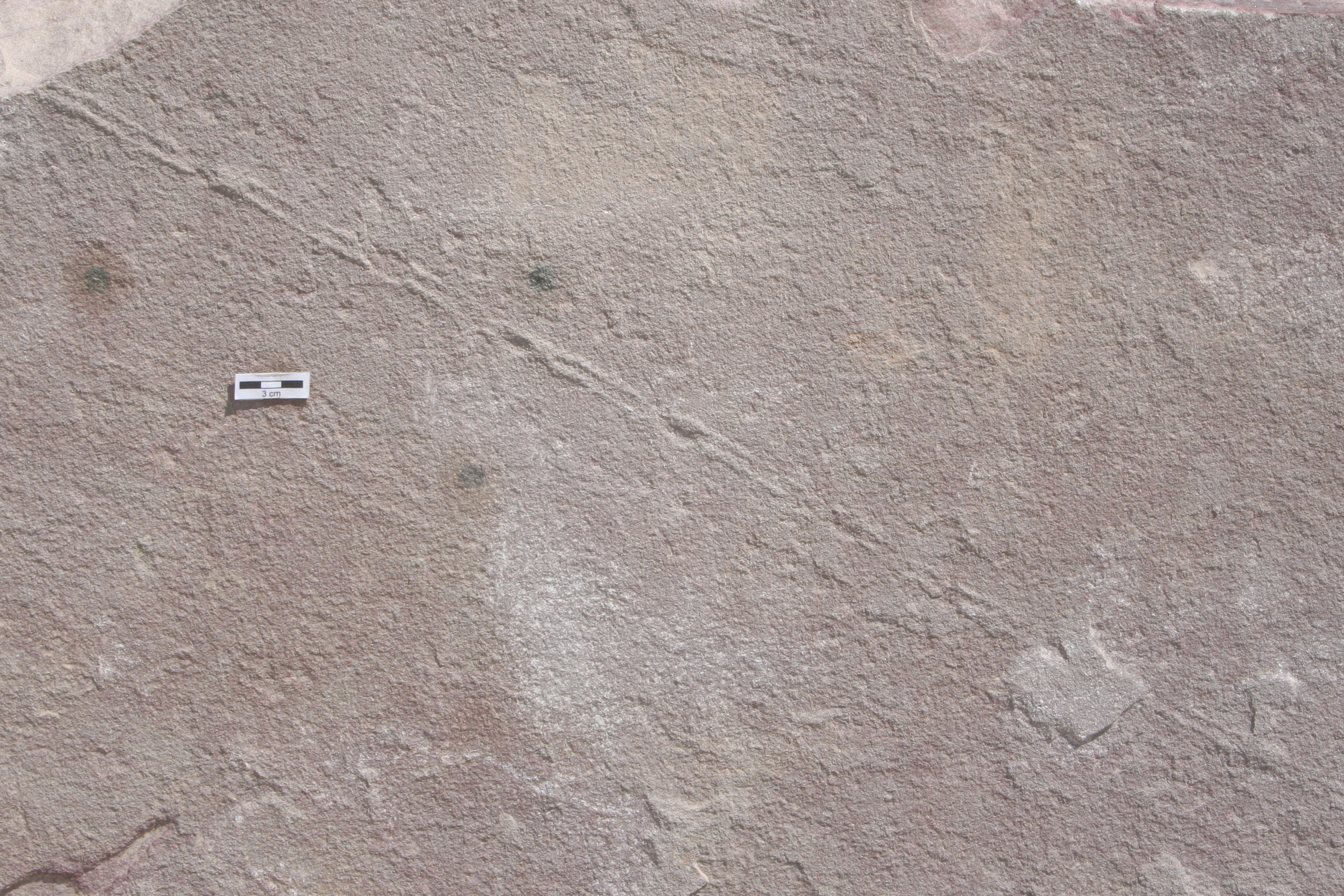
Protichnites in the lower Potsdam Sandstone.

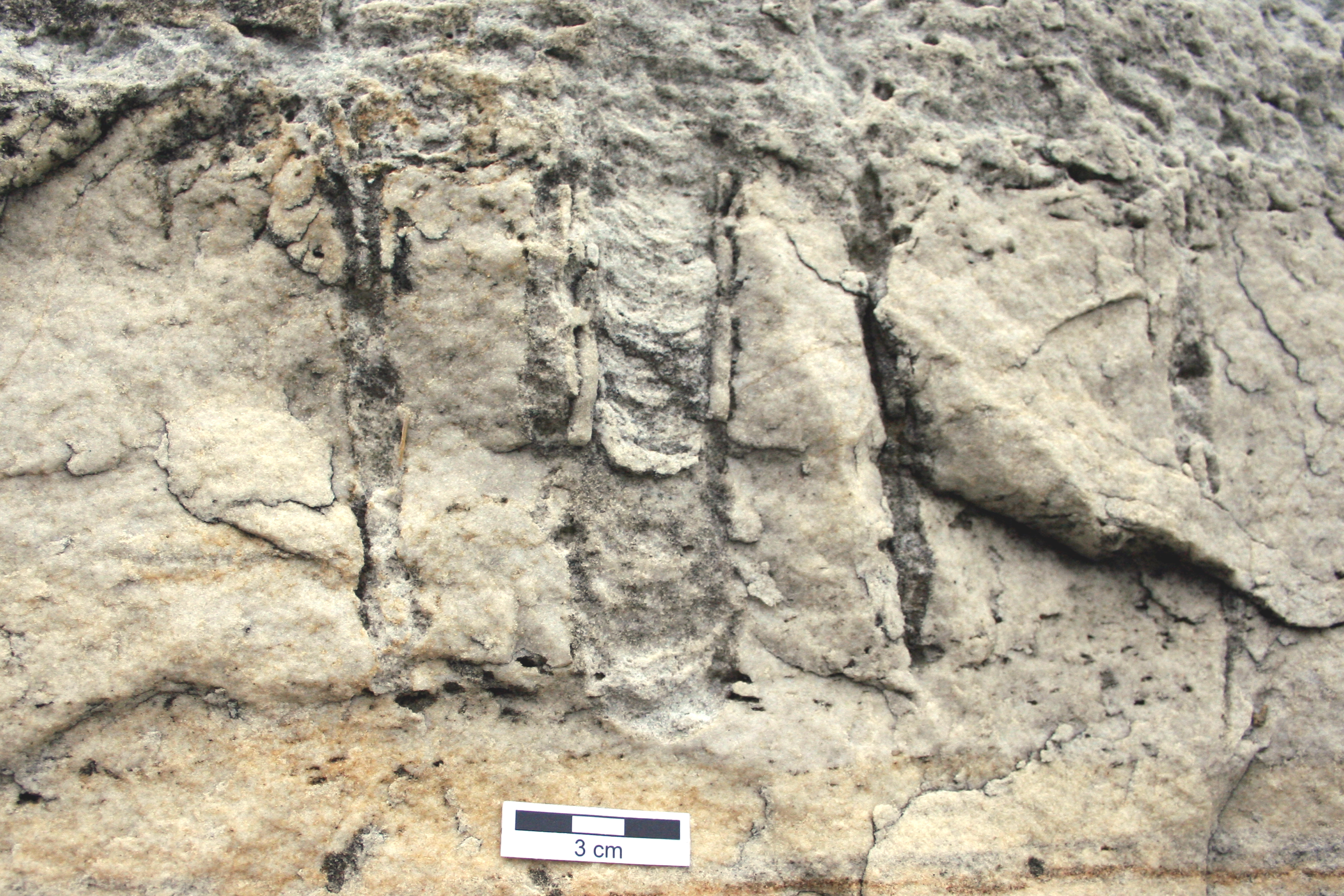
Diplocraterion in the upper Potsdam Sandstone.

Fossil remains of whole animals are rare in the Potsdam Sandstone (although several relatively complete arthropods are known such as Aglaspis and Mictomerus), but there are some significant occurrences of trace fossils. Trace fossils in the unit include both vertical burrows, such as Diplocraterion and Skolithos and horizontal trackways, such as Diplichnites, Protichnites, and Climactichnites. In 1903, a 20-ton (18-tonne) slab of Potsdam Sandstone from Clinton County, New York, displaying tracks attributed to trilobites, was placed in the New York State Museum. Fossil impressions of the whole bodies of jellyfish have also been found in the Potsdam.

== See also ==
- List of sandstones
