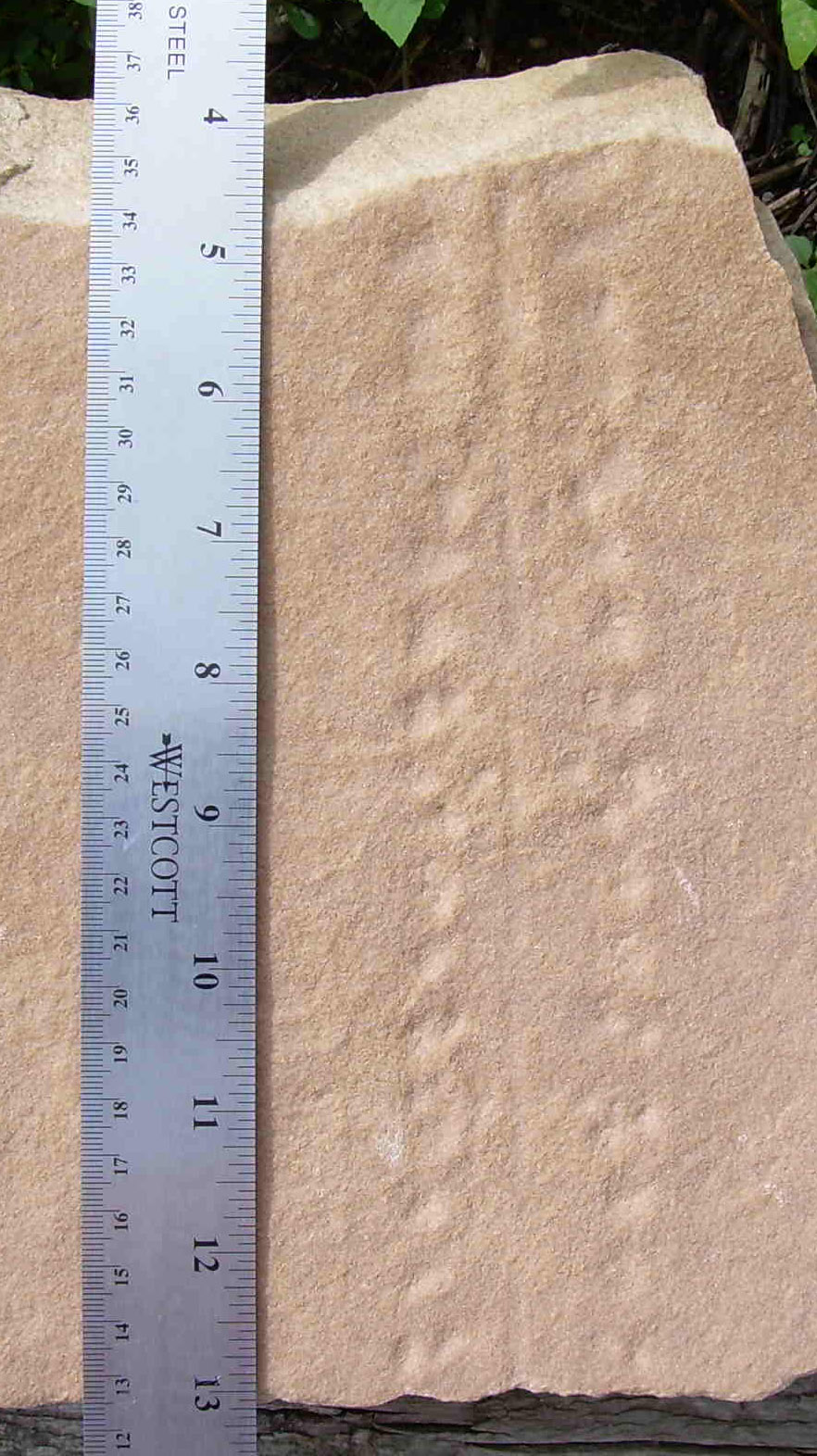
- The trackway Protichnites from the Cambrian of Blackberry Hill, Wisconsin

Trace fossil classification
- Kingdom: Animalia
- Phylum: Arthropoda (?)
- Ichnogenus: †Protichnites; Owen, 1852

Ichnospecies
- †Protichnites alternans; †Protichnites eremita; †Protichnites latus; †Protichnites lineatus; †Protichnites multinotatus; †Protichnites octo-notatus; †Protichnites septem-notatus

= Protichnites =

Protichnites Temporal range: 530.0–457.5 Ma

Trace fossil

Protichnites is an ichnogenus of trace fossil consisting of the imprints made by the walking activity of certain arthropods. It consists of two rows of tracks and a medial furrow between the two rows. This furrow, which may be broken, set at an angle, and of varying width and depth, is thought to be the result of the tail region contacting the substrate.

== The first footprints on land ==
Sir Richard Owen, the noted British paleontologist and anatomist who coined the term "Dinosauria", based Protichnites on trackways that were shipped to him from the Cambrian Potsdam Sandstone of Quebec. He was correct in recognizing that these were the oldest known footprints on land, having been produced in intertidal and supratidal environments during what would now be called Cambrian times.

== The Protichnites makers ==
Owen first thought that these trackways were made by tortoises, but new material convinced him that "articulates" (a group that included the arthropods) were responsible. He further suggested a kinship with Limulus, the modern horseshoe crab. Additional material was collected in Quebec, Ontario, New York, Wisconsin, and Missouri for the next 150 years without a single fossil of the maker of these traces. Finally, body fossils of potential makers were found in two of the same quarries that preserved Protichnites from the Elk Mound Group of Blackberry Hill, Wisconsin, and the Potsdam Group of Melocheville, Quebec. The animals, Mosineia macnaughtoni and Mictomerus melochevillensis, were euthycarcinoids, extinct arthropods that may have given rise to the mandibulates. Fossils that clearly tie euthycarcinoids to Protichnites were then found at Blackberry Hill.

It is possible that other extinct arthropods, such as members of the Aglaspidida, may also have produced some of these trackways. Trilobites have been suggested as well; however, no aglaspidids or trilobites have been found thus far in the strata that contain this ichnogenus. Similar trackways are present in post-Cambrian strata; however, those are seldom referred to as Protichnites.

== Behavior ==
It has been suggested that one form of Protichnites, P. eremita Form 1, may have been produced by an ambulating pair of individuals, as in amplexus. In this form, the medial furrow is discontinuous and each section is set at an angle, such that the series of medial imprints have a shingled appearance, as might result if the female were displacing her tail to minimize its interference with external fertilization. A second set of medial imprints observed in Form 1 is postulated to have been produced by the tail region of the male of the pair. Protichnites eremita was originally interpreted as early evidence of hermit crab-like behavior. It has also been suggested that some P. eremita may have been produced by distressed individuals attempting to return to a body of water after being stranded during high tide, which was more extensive than today due to the moon being closer to Earth in Cambrian times.

== Relationship with Diplichnites ==
Differing only in the presence or absence of a medial furrow, Protichnites and Diplichnites trackways could both be produced by the same individual animal. In cases where the feet penetrate the sediment more deeply than does the tail, Diplichnites could be created on the underlying layer while Protichnites is being produced on the surface.
