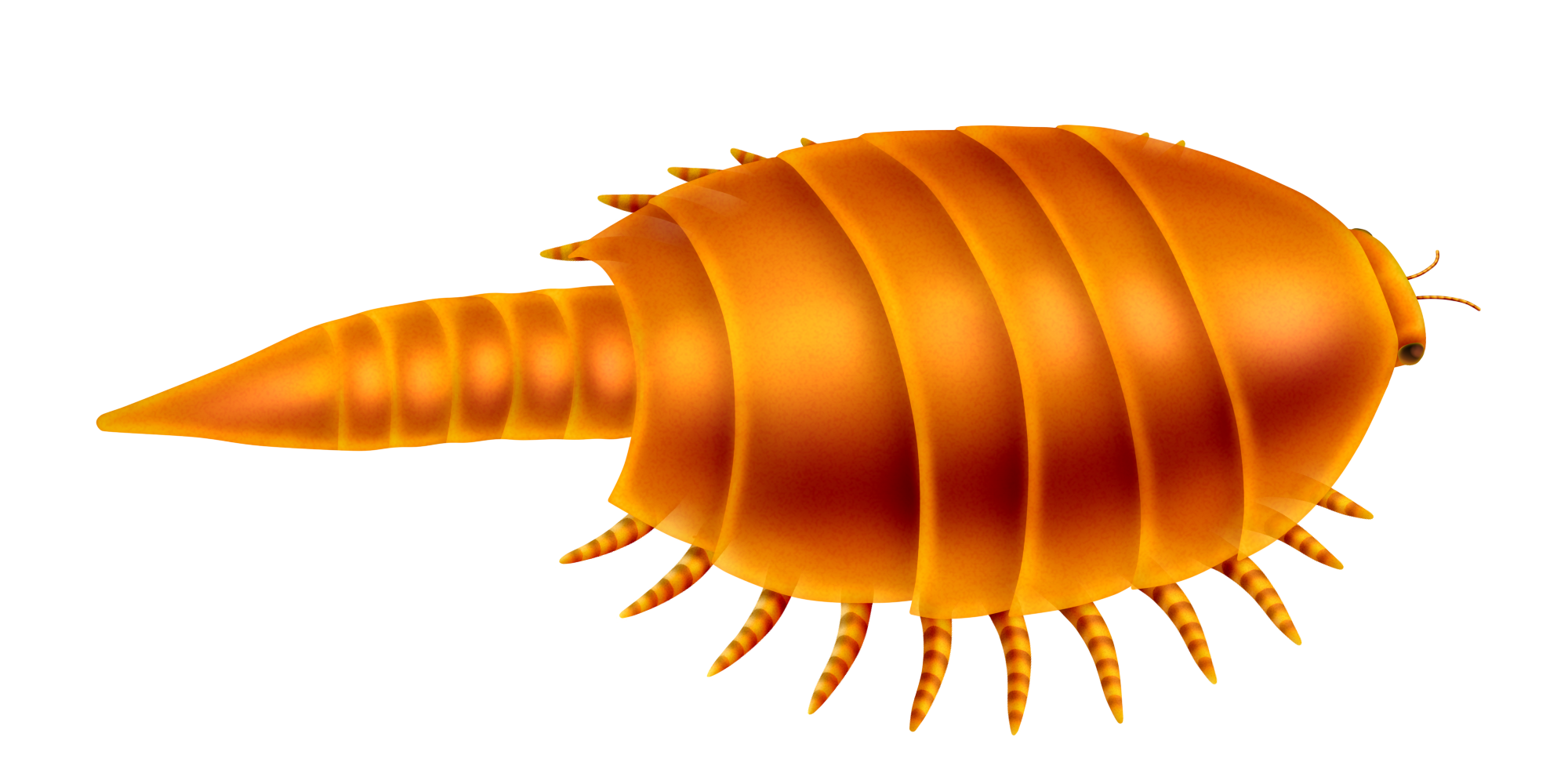
- Life restoration of Apankura
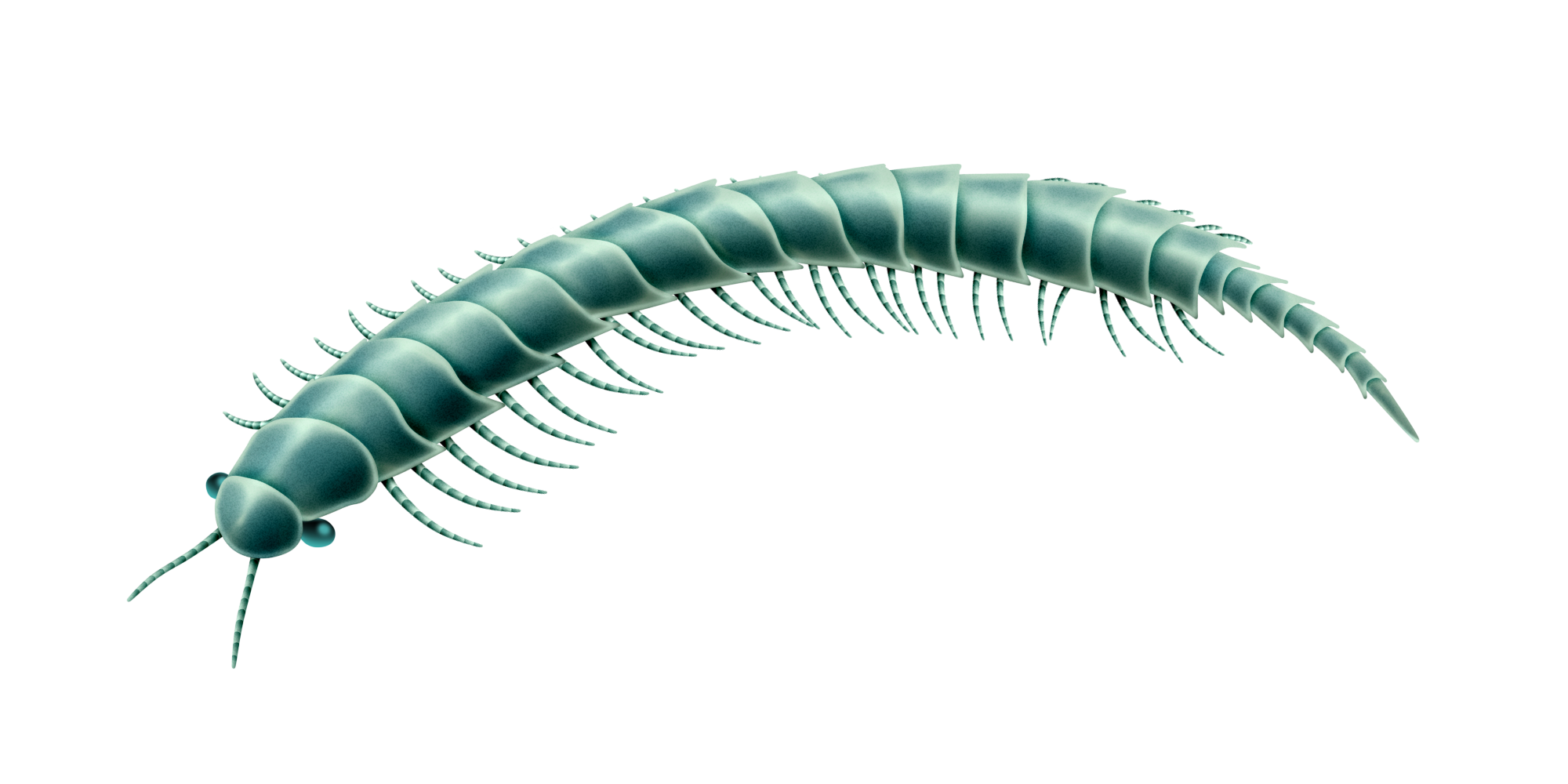
- Life restoration of Sottyxerxes

Scientific classification
- Kingdom: Animalia
- Phylum: Arthropoda
- Clade: Mandibulata
- Stem group: Myriapoda
- Subclass: †Euthycarcinoidea; Gall & Grauvogel, 1964
- Order: †Euthycarcinida; Gall & Grauvogel, 1964

Genera
- See text

= Euthycarcinoidea =

Euthycarcinoidea Temporal range: Cambrian–Middle Triassic

Extinct order of arthropods

Euthycarcinoidea are a group of extinct, possibly amphibious arthropods that ranged from the Cambrian to the Triassic. Fossils are known from Europe, North America, Argentina, Australia, and Antarctica. While previously considered enigmatic, they are now widely considered to be members of Mandibulata, and possibly the closest known relatives of Myriapoda (which contains millipedes and centipedes, among others).

== Description ==
The euthycarcinoid body was divided into a cephalon (head), preabdomen, and postabdomen. The cephalon consisted of two segments and included mandibles, antennae and presumed eyes. The preabdomen consisted of five to fourteen tergites, each having up to three somites. Each somite had in turn a pair of uniramous (unbranched), segmented legs. The postabdomen was limbless and consisted of up to six segments and a terminal tail spine.

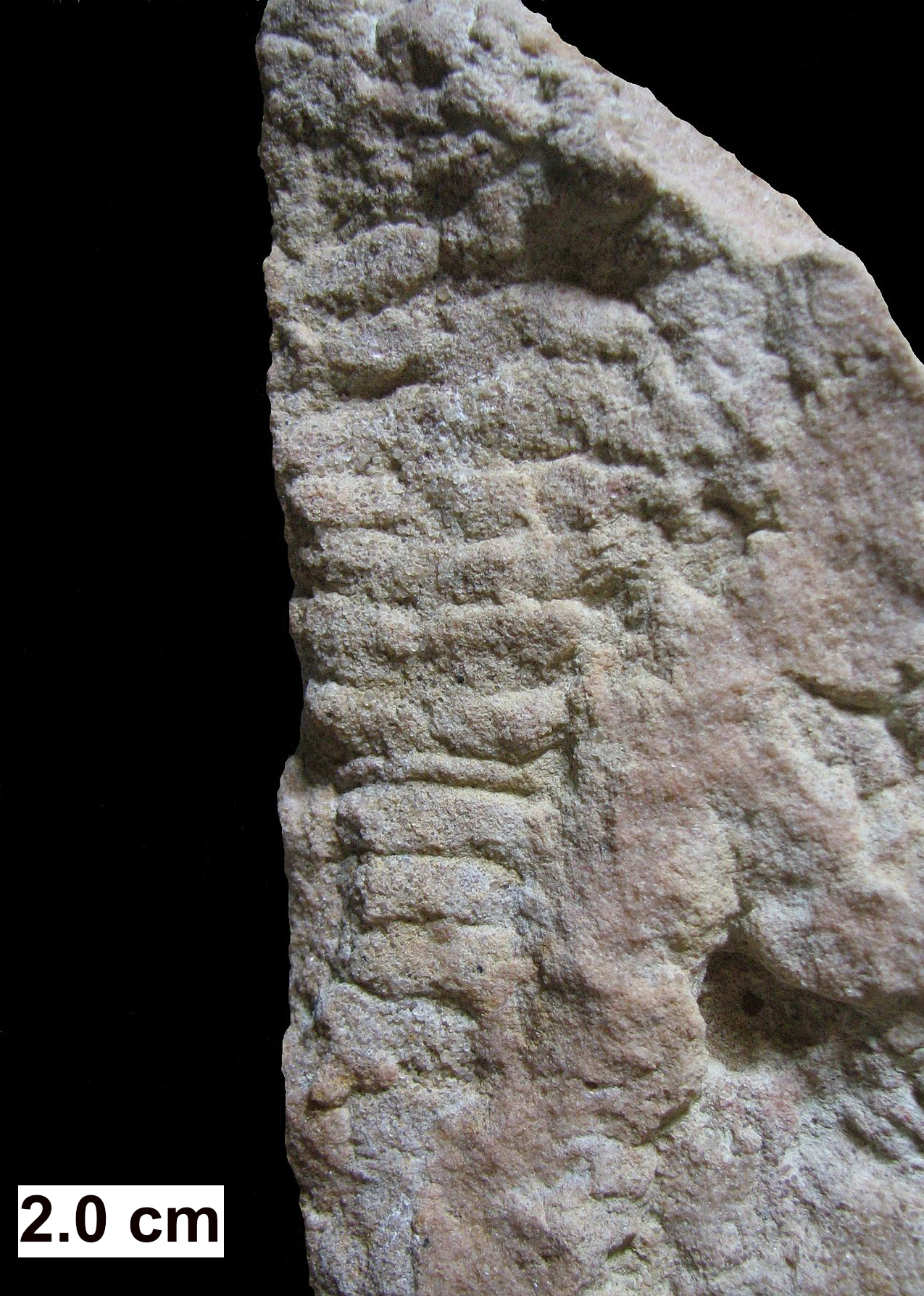
The Cambrian euthycarcinoid Mosineia macnaughtoni from the Elk Mound Group, Blackberry Hill, central Wisconsin. Cambrian euthycarcinoids such as this one may have been the first animals to walk and survive on land.

== Affinities ==
Due to its particular combination of characteristics, the position of the Euthycarcinoidea within the Arthropoda has been ambiguous; previous authors have allied euthycarcinoids with crustaceans (interpreted as copepods, branchiopods, or an independent group), with trilobites, or the merostomatans (horseshoe crabs and sea scorpions, now an obsolete group). However, due to the general features and the discovery of fossils from this group in Cambrian rocks, a 2010 study suggested that they may have given rise to the mandibulates, the group that includes the myriapods (centipedes, millipedes and the like), crustaceans, and hexapods (insects, etc.).

- - Euchelicerata
  - - Euthycarcinoidea
    - - Myriapoda
      - - Crustacea
        - Hexapoda

However, a 2020 study identified several characters, including compound eyes and various details of the preoral chamber, that suggested instead a position as the closest relatives of living myriapods. This would help to close the gap between the earliest body fossils of crown-group myriapods in the Silurian and molecular clock data suggesting a divergence from their closest relatives during the Ediacaran or Cambrian. This had already been suggested by the cladogram of a previous study. Cladogram of Mandibulata after Laville et al. (2025), showing proposed position of Euthycarcinida as sister to Myriapoda:

- Mandibulata
  - †Aquilonifer
  - - †Tanazios
    - - - †Acheronauta
        - †Captopodus
      - - - †Nereocaris
          - - †Fuxianhuiida
            - †Hymenocarina
        - - - †Euthycarcinida
            - Myriapoda (including centipedes and millipedes)
          - Pancrustacea
            ⊞
            ⊟
            - Allotriocarida
              - Branchiopoda (tadpole shrimp/Triops, fairy shrimp, clam shrimp, water fleas)
              - - Hexapoda (including springtails and insects)
                - Xenocarida
                  - Cephalocarida (horseshoe shrimp)
                  - Remipedia
            - - Oligostraca
                - Branchiura (fish lice)
                - - Ostracoda
                  - Mystacocaridida
              - Multicrustacea
                - Copepoda
                - - Cirripedia (barnacles)
                  - - †Cyclida (Americlidae)
                    - - †Thylacocephala
                      - - Malacostraca (shrimp, prawn, lobsters, mantis shrimp, crab, woodlice, etc)

== Environment and life habits ==
Euthycarcinoid fossils have been found in marine, brackish and freshwater deposits. Taxa from the Cambrian are from marine or intertidal sediments, while all specimens from the Ordovician to the Triassic are freshwater or brackish. Fossil impressions of euthycarcinoid postabdomens in association with Protichnites trackways in Cambrian intertidal/supratidal deposits also suggest that euthycarcinoids may have been the first arthropods to walk on land. It has been suggested that the biofilms and microbial mats that covered much of the vast tidal flats during the Cambrian Period in North America may have provided the nourishment that lured these arthropods onto the land. Fossil evidence also suggests the possibility that some euthycarcinoids came onto the land to lay and fertilize their eggs via amplexus, as do the modern horseshoe crabs.

== Classification ==
The known species of euthycarcinoids and their distribution were reviewed by Racheboeuf et al. in 2008. Additional species were described by Collette and Hagadorn in 2010.

Family	Genus	Species	Age	Type of deposits	Location of deposits
Euthycarcinidae; Handlirsch, 1914	Euthycarcinus; Handlirsch, 1914	E. ibbenburensis Schultka, 1991	Pennsylvanian: Westphalian	Freshwater	Germany
Euthycarcinidae; Handlirsch, 1914	Euthycarcinus; Handlirsch, 1914	E. kessleri Handlirsch, 1914	Triassic	Freshwater	France
Euthycarcinidae; Handlirsch, 1914	Euthycarcinus; Handlirsch, 1914	E. martensi Schneider, 1983	Permian	Freshwater	Germany
Euthycarcinidae; Handlirsch, 1914	Synaustrus; Riek, 1964	S. brookvalensis Riek, 1964	Triassic	Freshwater	Australia
Kottixerxidae; Starobogatov, 1988	Heterocrania; Hirst & Maulik, 1926	H. rhyniensis Hirst & Maulik, 1926	Lower Devonian	Freshwater	United Kingdom
Kottixerxidae; Starobogatov, 1988	Kalbarria; McNamara & Trewin, 1993	K. brimmellae McNamara & Trewin, 1993	Ordovician or Late Silurian (age is controversial)	Freshwater (habitat is controversial)	Australia
Kottixerxidae; Starobogatov, 1988	Kottixerxes; Schram, 1971	K. anglicus Wilson & Almond, 2001	Pennsylvanian: Westphalian	Brackish to freshwater	United Kingdom
Kottixerxidae; Starobogatov, 1988	Kottixerxes; Schram, 1971	K. gloriosus Schram, 1971	Pennsylvanian: Westphalian	Brackish to freshwater	United States
Kottixerxidae; Starobogatov, 1988	Schramixerxes; Starobogatov, 1988	S. gerem (Schram & Rolfe, 1982)	Late Pennsylvanian: Stephanian	Freshwater	France
Kottixerxidae; Starobogatov, 1988	Smithixerxes; Schram & Rolfe, 1982	S. juliarum Schram & Rolfe, 1982	Pennsylvanian: Westphalian	Brackish to freshwater	United States
Kottixerxidae; Starobogatov, 1988	Smithixerxes; Schram & Rolfe, 1982	S. pustulosus Wilson & Almond, 2001	Pennsylvanian: Westphalian	Brackish to freshwater	United Kingdom
Mictomeridae; Collette & Hagadorn, 2010	Mictomerus; Collette & Hagadorn, 2010	M. melochevillensis Collette & Hagadorn, 2010	Cambrian	Intertidal	Canada
incertae sedis	Antarcticarcinus; Collette, Isbell & Miller, 2017	A. pagoda Collette, Isbell & Miller, 2017	Pennsylvanian: Gzhelian to Permian: Asselian	Freshwater	Pagoda Formation, Antarctica
incertae sedis	Apankura; Vaccari, Edgecombe & Escudero, 2004	A. machu Vaccari, Edgecombe & Escudero, 2004	Cambrian	Marine	Argentina
incertae sedis	Ericixerxes; Gueriau, Lamsdell, Wogelius, Manning, Egerton, Bergmann, Bertrand & Denayer, 2020	E. potii Gueriau, Lamsdell, Wogelius, Manning, Egerton, Bergmann, Bertrand & Denayer, 2020	Upper Devonian	Brackish	Belgium
incertae sedis	Mosineia; Collette & Hagadorn, 2010	M. macnaughtoni Collette & Hagadorn, 2010	Cambrian	Intertidal	United States
incertae sedis	Pieckoxerxes; Starobogatov, 1988	P. pieckoae (Schram & Rolfe, 1982)	Pennsylvanian: Westphalian	Brackish to freshwater	United States
incertae sedis	Sottyxerxes; Schram & Rolfe, 1982	S. multiplex Schram & Rolfe, 1982	Late Pennsylvanian: Stephanian	Freshwater	France
