= Palaeoworld =

- Cover of volume 25, issue 2 (June 2016). The theme of the issue is the systematics and biodiversity of Lagerstätten.
- Discipline: Paleontology; Stratigraphy
- Language: Chinese, English
- Edited by: Qun Yang and David Harper

Publication details
- History: 1991–present
- Publisher: Elsevier, on behalf of the Nanjing Institute of Geology and Palaeontology (China)
- Frequency: Quarterly
- Open access: Hybrid
- Impact factor: 1.841 (2020)

Standard abbreviations
- ISO 4: Palaeoworld

Indexing
- ISSN: 1871-174X (print); 1875-5887 (web)
- LCCN: 2007202708
- OCLC no.: 73667170

Links
- Palaeoworld at Elsevier.com; Palaeoworld at ScienceDirect.com

Palaeoworld is a peer-reviewed academic journal with a focus on palaeontology and stratigraphy research in and around China. It was founded in 1991 by the Nanjing Institute of Geology and Palaeontology at the Chinese Academy of Sciences (NIGPAS). The journal has been published quarterly since 2006; prior to 2006, it did not adhere to a fixed publication schedule.

The journal publishes articles from several specialised fields pertaining to palaeobiology and earth science, such as: fossil taxonomy; biostratigraphy, chemostratigraphy, and chronostratigraphy; evolutionary biology; evolutionary ecology; palaeoecology; palaeoclimatology; and molecular palaeontology.

Its editors-in-chief are Shuzhong Shen of the State Key Laboratory of Palaeobiology and Stratigraphy at NIGPAS, and Norman MacLeod of the Natural History Museum, London.

== See also ==
- Paleontological Journal
- List of fossil sites
