= Mictomerus =

Mictomerus Temporal range: Furongian

Scientific classification
- Kingdom: Animalia
- Phylum: Arthropoda
- Subclass: †Euthycarcinoidea
- Genus: †Mictomerus; Colette & Hagadorn, 2010
- Species: †M. melochevillensis

Binomial name
- †Mictomerus melochevillensis Colette & Hagadorn, 2010

Extinct genus of euthycarcinoid

Mictomerus is an extinct genus of Cambrian euthycarcinoids from the Potsdam Group of Quebec, Canada. The genus contains a single species, Mictomerus melochevillensis, known from 29 specimens, all but one preserved ventrally.

== Description ==
Mictomerus's cephalic area is poorly known, with an elongate oval structure at the anterior portion with a narrow medial invagination, and two circular structures which may be eyes. The thorax has five to six overlapping tergites, with varying posterolateral margins. Due to the ventral preservation of the specimens, their dorsal surfaces are unknown. The thorax's segmentation is also unknown, however it can be inferred from the limbs. The abdomen is composed of five limbless segments, decreasing slightly in width. The abdomen lacks ornamentation, and the telson is not known. The limbs are uniramous and composed of three to five segments, with the first being the widest. These limbs decrease in size towards the posterior of the animal. Mictomerus likely lived in intertidal regions, with brief forays onto land evidenced by trackways, feeding on microbial mats and detritus via gnathobases (inferred from the very closely spaced limbs and ventromedial groove). The limbs of Mictomerus are much more robust than other euthycarcinoids, suggesting it walked along the bottom when moving through water. It also may have burrowed into mud as an anti-desiccation measure, as evidenced by casts preserved at the end of Cruziana-like fossils.

== Etymology ==
Mictomerus derives from the Greek words miktous meaning "mixed" and meros meaning "parts". The specific name melochevillensis is named after Melocheville, Quebec, where the holotype was found.
