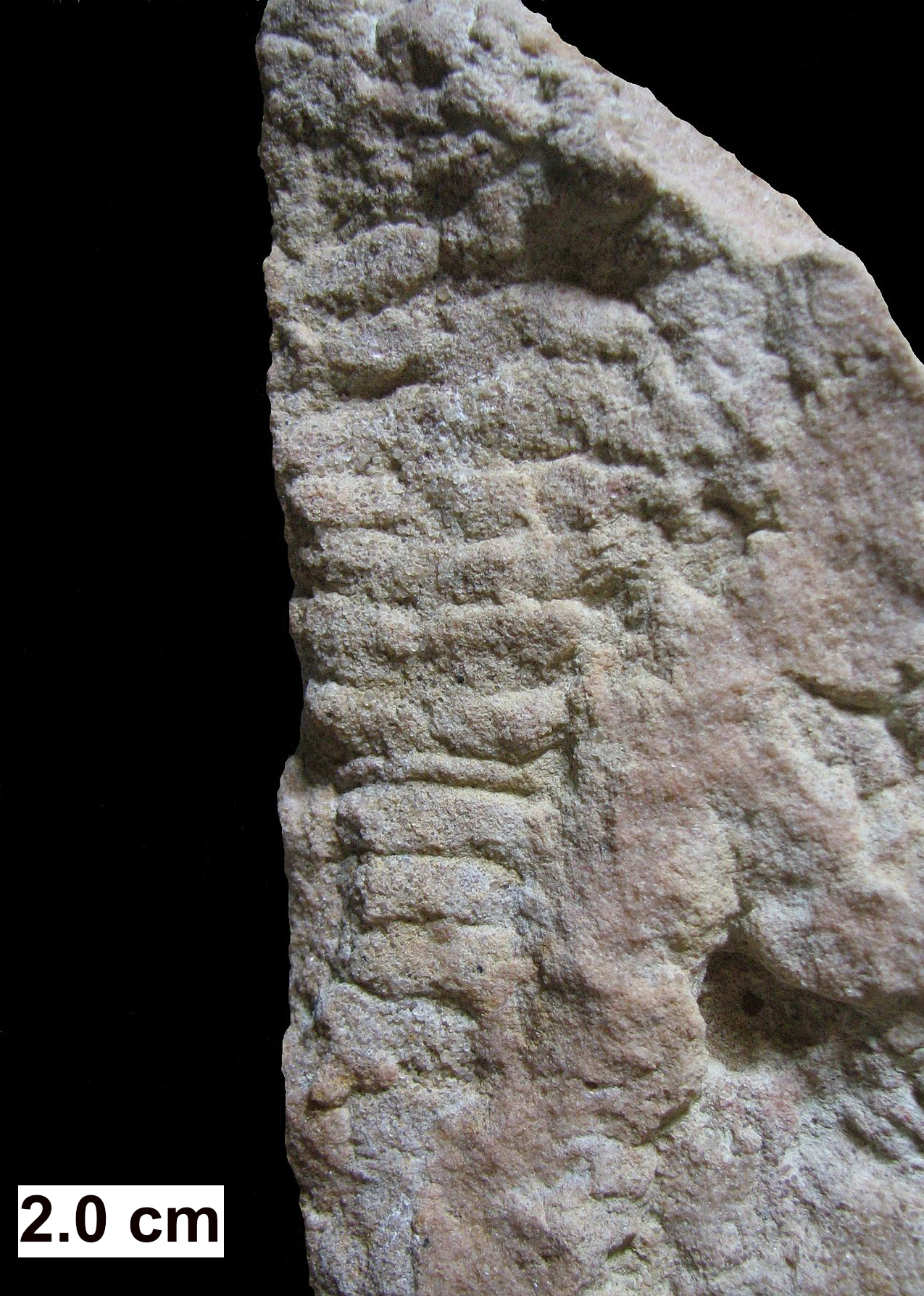
- The euthycarcinoid Mosineia macnaughtoni from the Elk Mound Group of Wisconsin; ventral view

Scientific classification
- Kingdom: Animalia
- Phylum: Arthropoda
- Subclass: †Euthycarcinoidea
- Genus: †Mosineia; Collette & Hagadorn 2010
- Species: †M. macnaughtoni

Binomial name
- †Mosineia macnaughtoni Collette & Hagadorn 2010

= Mosineia =

Mosineia Temporal range: Middle Cambrian-Late Cambrian ~500–489 Ma

Extinct genus of arthropods

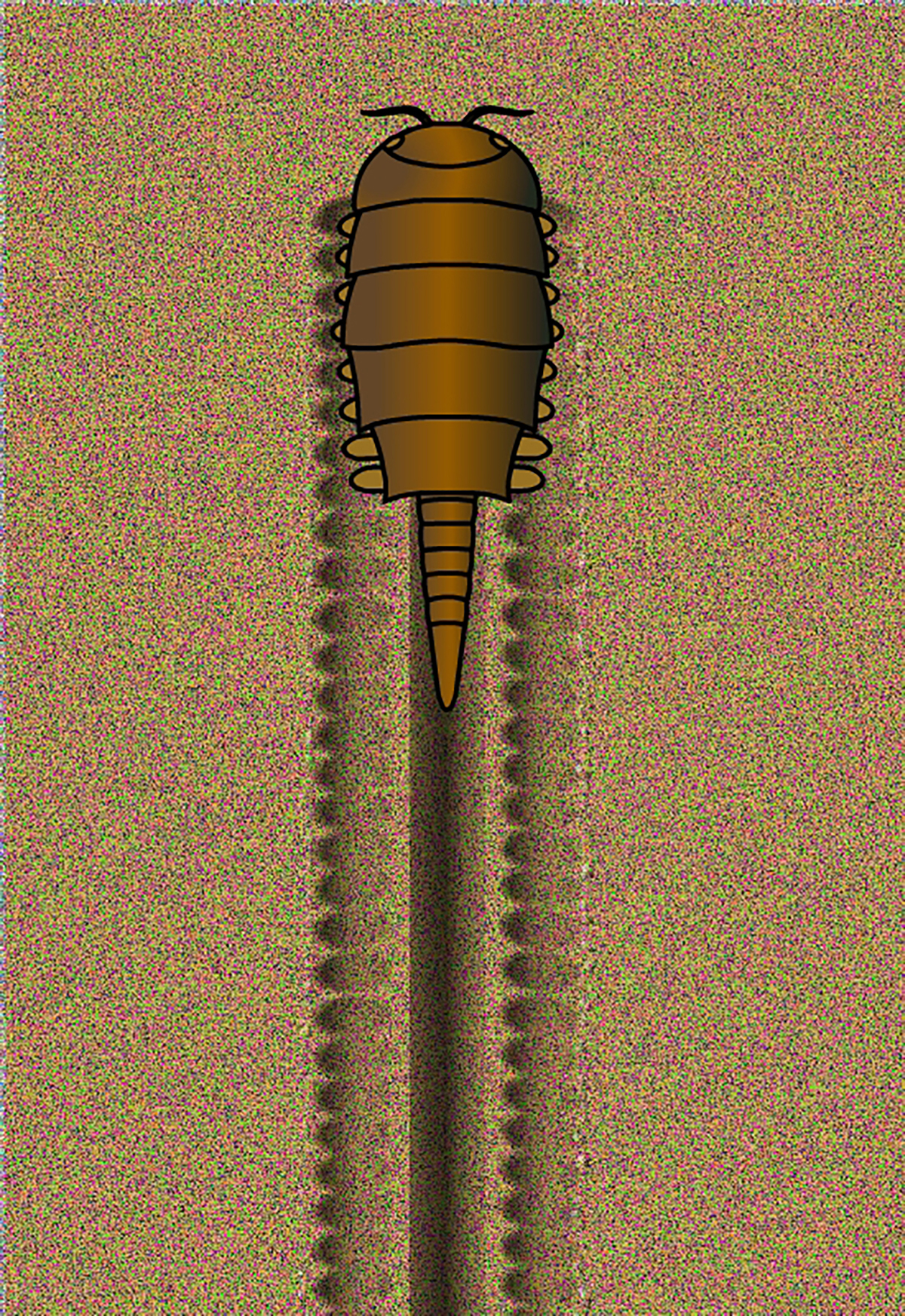
Conceptual drawing of Mosineia making the trackway Protichnites. Drawn by Todd Gass

Mosineia is a genus of euthycarcinoid arthropods that lived on tidal flats of Laurentia at what is now central Wisconsin from the Middle Cambrian to the Late Cambrian. It contains a single species, Mosineia macnaughtoni. Associated trace fossil evidence suggests that this genus spent some of its time subaerially, possibly to mate and to feed on the microbial mats that blanketed the beaches. The genus is named after Mosinee – the city in Marathon County, Wisconsin, near which the fossils were found. The collecting site is known as Blackberry Hill, which is a well known Konservat-Lagerstätte that produces abundant exceptionally preserved fossils.

== History of discovery ==
The discovery of Mosineia was a milestone in geologic history. Since the mid-1800s, trackways named Protichnites (Greek for "first footprints") had been found on Cambrian tidal flat strata in North America. Whatever animal produced them was one of the first to emerge from the sea; however, the identity of that animal remained unknown. The new fossils, found in the late 1900s and early 2000s, including body fossils of the animal itself (Mosineia) and fossils linking that animal to the trackways, thus solved a mystery that had lasted over 150 years.
