= List of the Paleozoic life of New York (state) =

This list of the Paleozoic life of New York contains the various prehistoric life-forms whose fossilized remains have been reported from within the US state of New York and are between 538.8 and 252.17 million years of age.

== A ==
- †Acanthoclema
  - †Acanthoclema aspera
  - †Acanthoclema asperum
- †Acanthoclymenia
  - †Acanthoclymenia genundewa
  - †Acanthoclymenia neapolitana
- †Acanthocrinus
  - †Acanthocrinus spinosus
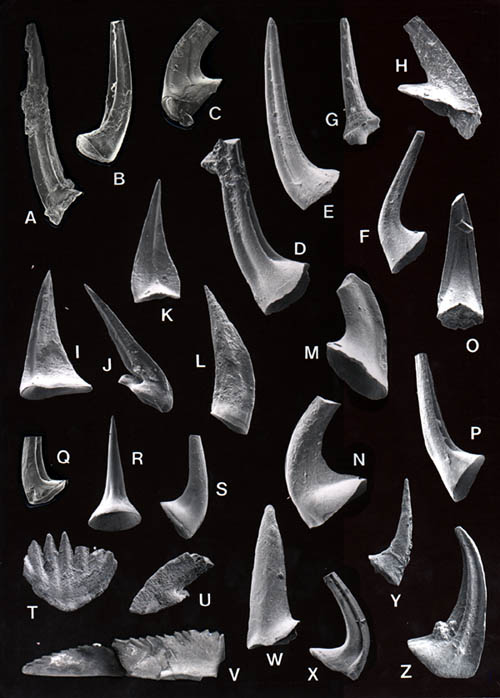
- Fossilized teeth (W) of the Cambrian–Early Ordovician conodont Acanthodus
  †Acanthodus
  - †Acanthodus uncinatus
- †Acanthoparypha – tentative report
- †Acanthoscapha
- †Achatella
  - †Achatella achates
- †Acheilops
  - †Acheilops masonensis
- †Acidiphorus
  - †Acidiphorus whittingtoni
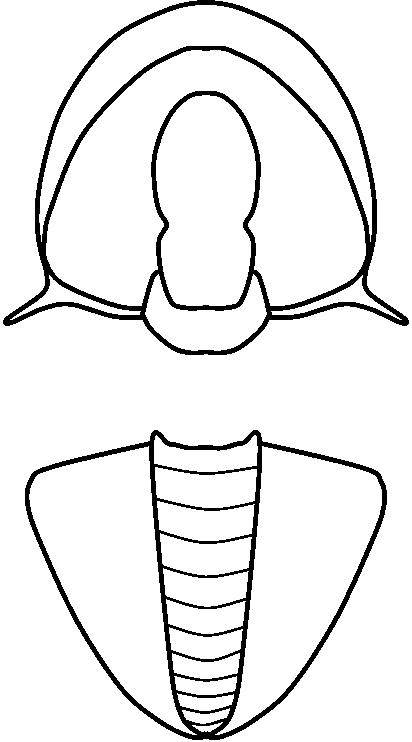
- Illustration of fossils of the Cambrian trilobite Acidiscus
  †Acidiscus
- †Acimetopus
- †Acinophyllum
- †Acinopteria
- †Aclistocrinus
  - †Aclistocrinus capistratus
- †Acodus
  - †Acodus similaris
- †Acrogenia
- †Acrospirifer
  - †Acrospirifer duodenaria
  - †Acrospirifer macrothyris
- †Acrothele
- †Acrotreta
- †Actinoceras
  - †Actinoceras ruedemanni
  - †Actinoceras ruedemonni
  - †Actinoceras vertebratum
- †Actinodesma
  - †Actinodesma erectum
- †Actinophyllum
- †Actinopterella
- †Actinopteria
  - †Actinopteria boydi
  - †Actinopteria boydii
  - †Actinopteria decussata
  - †Actinopteria muricatus
  - †Actinopteria recumbant
  - †Actinopteria subdessucata
- †Actinostromella
  - †Actinostromella vaiverensis
- †Actinoxylon
  - †Actinoxylon banksii
- †Aculeatarbus – type locality for genus
  - †Aculeatarbus depressus – type locality for species
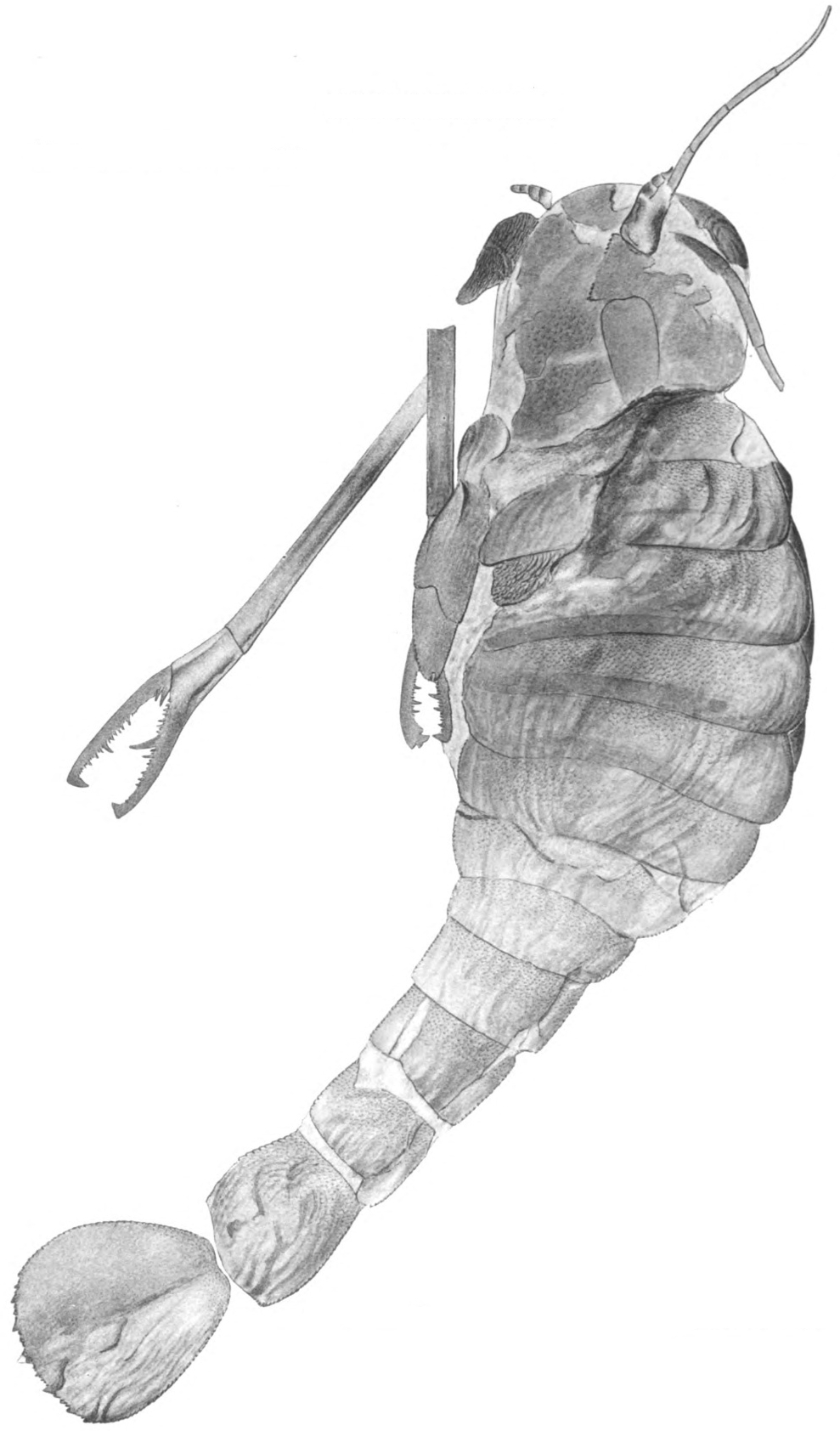
- Fossil of the Silurian-Early Devonian eurypterid ("sea scorpion") Acutiramus
  †Acutiramus
  - †Acutiramus floweri – type locality for species
  - †Acutiramus macrophthalmus
- †Adelphobolbina
  - †Adelphobolbina medialis – type locality for species
- †Aechmina
- †Aechminaria – tentative report
- †Aesopomum
- †Aglaeoglypta
  - †Aglaeoglypta koeneni
  - †Aglaeoglypta maera
- †Aglaoglypta
  - †Aglaoglypta koeneni – type locality for species
  - †Aglaoglypta maera
- †Agoniatites
  - †Agoniatites discoideus
  - †Agoniatites expansus
  - †Agoniatites nodiferus
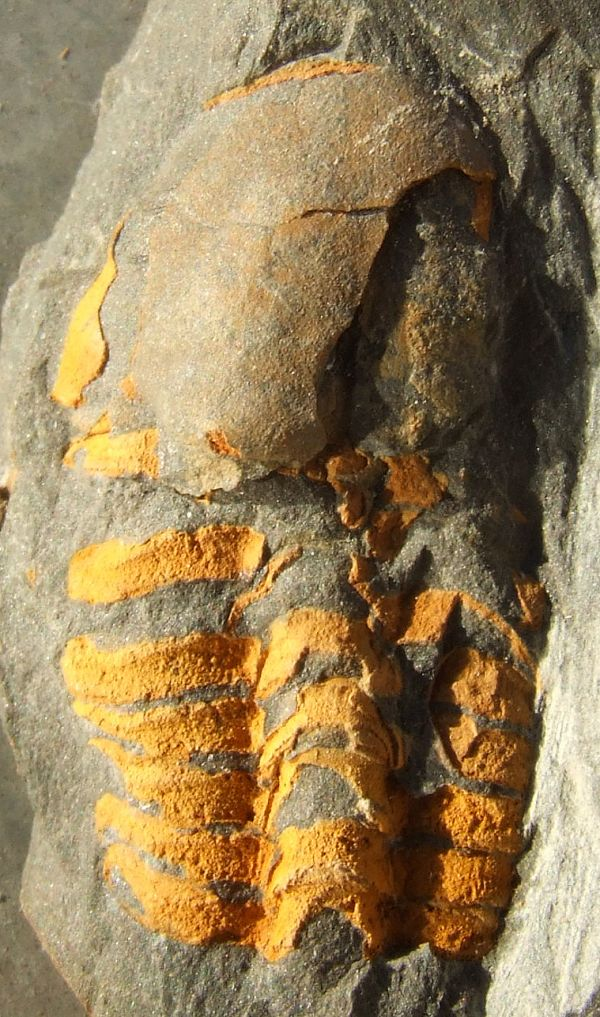
- Fossil of the Cambrian trilobite Agraulos
  †Agraulos
  - †Agraulos saratogensis
- †Aknisophyllum – type locality for genus
  - †Aknisophyllum consuitum – type locality for species
- †Alaionema
  - †Alaionema crenulatum
- †Alanella
- †Allanella
  - †Allanella tullia
  - †Allanella tullius
- †Allenella
  - †Allenella tullia
  - †Allenella tullius
- †Alleynia
  - †Alleynia americana
- †Allotrioceras
  - †Allotrioceras bifurcatum
- †Allumettoceras
  - †Allumettoceras giganteum
- †Ambocoelia
  - †Ambocoelia gregaria
  - †Ambocoelia praeumbonata
  - †Ambocoelia umbonata
- †Ambonychia
  - †Ambonychia praecursa
- †Ambonychiopsis
  - †Ambonychiopsis curvata
- †Amorphognathus
  - †Amorphognathus tvaerensis
- †Amphicoelia
  - †Amphicoelia orbiculoides
  - †Amphicoelia ordiculoides
- †Amphidoxodendron
  - †Amphidoxodendron dichotomum
- †Amphigenia
  - †Amphigenia curta
  - †Amphigenia elongata
- †Amphilicas
  - †Amphilicas cornutus
- †Amphilichas
  - †Amphilichas minganensis
- †Amphiocoelia
- †Amphissella
  - †Amphissella papillosa – type locality for species
- †Amphistrophia
  - †Amphistrophia striata
- †Amphizona
  - †Amphizona asceta
- †Amplexiphyllum
  - †Amplexiphyllum hamiltoniae
- †Amplexograptus
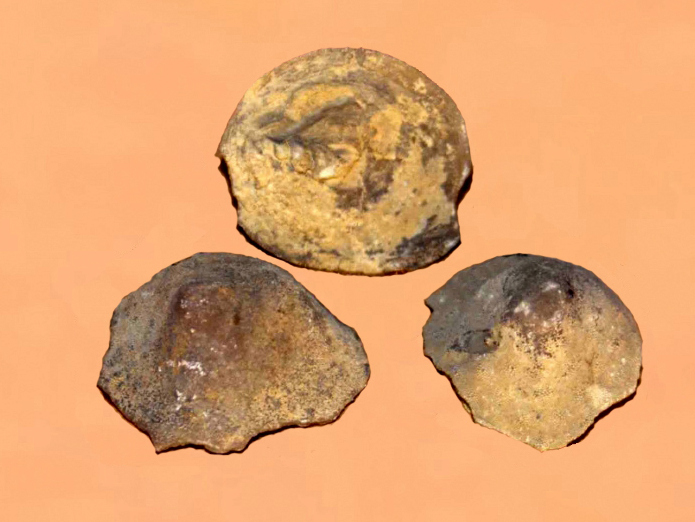
- Fossils of the Ordovician-Permian bryozoan Amplexopora
  †Amplexopora
  - †Amplexopora minnesotensis
  - †Amplexopora winchelli
- †Amplexus
  - †Amplexus hamiltoniae
- †Analox
- †Anamesocrinus
  - †Anamesocrinus lutheri
  - †Anamesocrinus spinobrachiatus – type locality for species
- †Anastrophia
  - †Anastrophia brevirostris
  - †Anastrophia interplicata
  - †Anastrophia verneuili
- †Anazyga
  - †Anazyga recurvirostra
- †Anchiopsis
  - †Anchiopsis anchiops
- †Ancillotoechia
  - †Ancillotoechia obtusiplicata
- †Ancistrorhyncha
- †Ancyrocrinus
  - †Ancyrocrinus bulbosus
- †Aneurophyton
  - †Aneurophyton germanicum
  - †Aneurophyton hallii
  - †Aneurophyton rachides
- †Aneurospora
  - †Aneurospora heterodontus – or unidentified comparable form
  - †Aneurospora semizonalis
- †Anisotechnophorus
  - †Anisotechnophorus nuculitiformis – type locality for species
- †Annoceras
  - †Annoceras costatum
  - †Annoceras multicameratum
- †Anomalocystites
  - †Anomalocystites coronatus
- †Anoplia
  - †Anoplia nucleata
- †Anoplotheca
- †Anostylostroma
- †Anrangeroceras
  - †Anrangeroceras repens
  - †Anrangeroceras whitehallense
- †Antholites
- †Aorocrinus
  - †Aorocrinus formosus
- †Aparchites
  - †Aparchites minutissimus
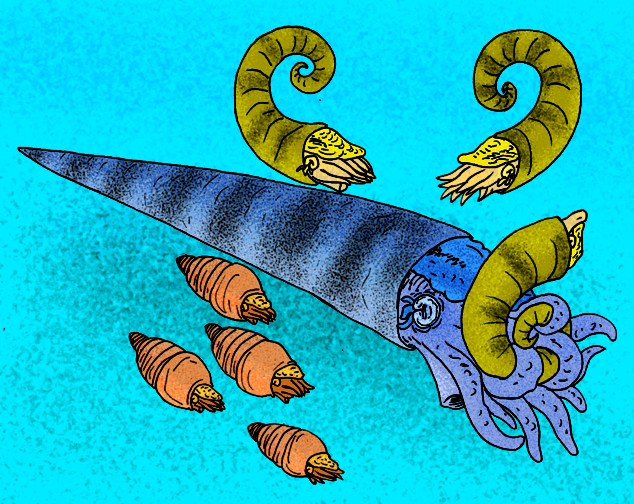
- Restoration of the Middle Ordovician-Silurian nautiloid cephalopod Cameroceras feeding on an Aphetoceras, while a quartet of Cyclostomiceras swim by
  †Aphetoceras
  - †Aphetoceras attenuatum
  - †Aphetoceras farnsworthi
  - †Aphetoceras ruedemanni
- †Aphyllopteris
  - †Aphyllopteris delwarensis
- †Aphyllum
  - †Aphyllum fascicularium
- †Apianurus
  - †Apianurus narrawayi
- †Apiculiretusispora
  - †Apiculiretusispora brandtii
- †Apiocystites
  - †Apiocystites elegans
- †Apsidognathus
  - †Apsidognathus tuberculatus
- †Arachnoxylon
  - †Arachnoxylon kopfi
- †Archaeacarus – type locality for genus
  - †Archaeacarus dubinini – type locality for species
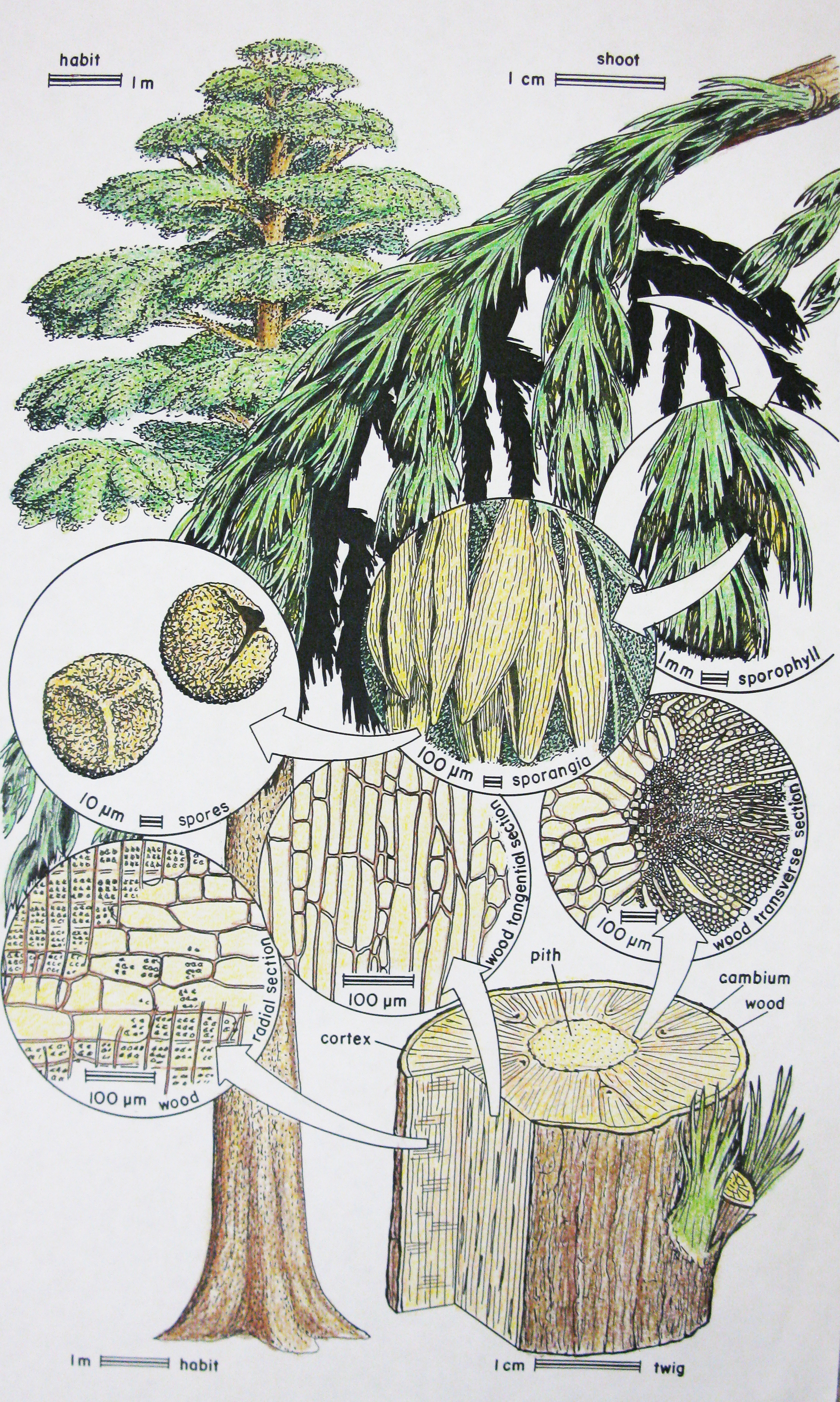
- Life restoration of the Late Devonian-Carboniferous tree Archaeopteris with insets detailing its anatomy
  †Archaeopteris
  - †Archaeopteris halliana
  - †Archaeopteris hibernica
  - †Archaeopteris macilenta
  - †Archaeopteris obtusa
  - †Archaeopteris sphenophyllifolia
- †Archaeosigillaria
  - †Archaeosigillaria primaeva
  - †Archaeosigillaria vanuxemi
  - †Archaeosigillaria vanuxemii
- †Archegonaspis
- †Archinacella
  - †Archinacella deformata
  - †Archinacella magna – type locality for species
  - †Archinacella parva – type locality for species
  - †Archinacella proprius
  - †Archinacella pulaskiensis
- †Archoceras – tentative report
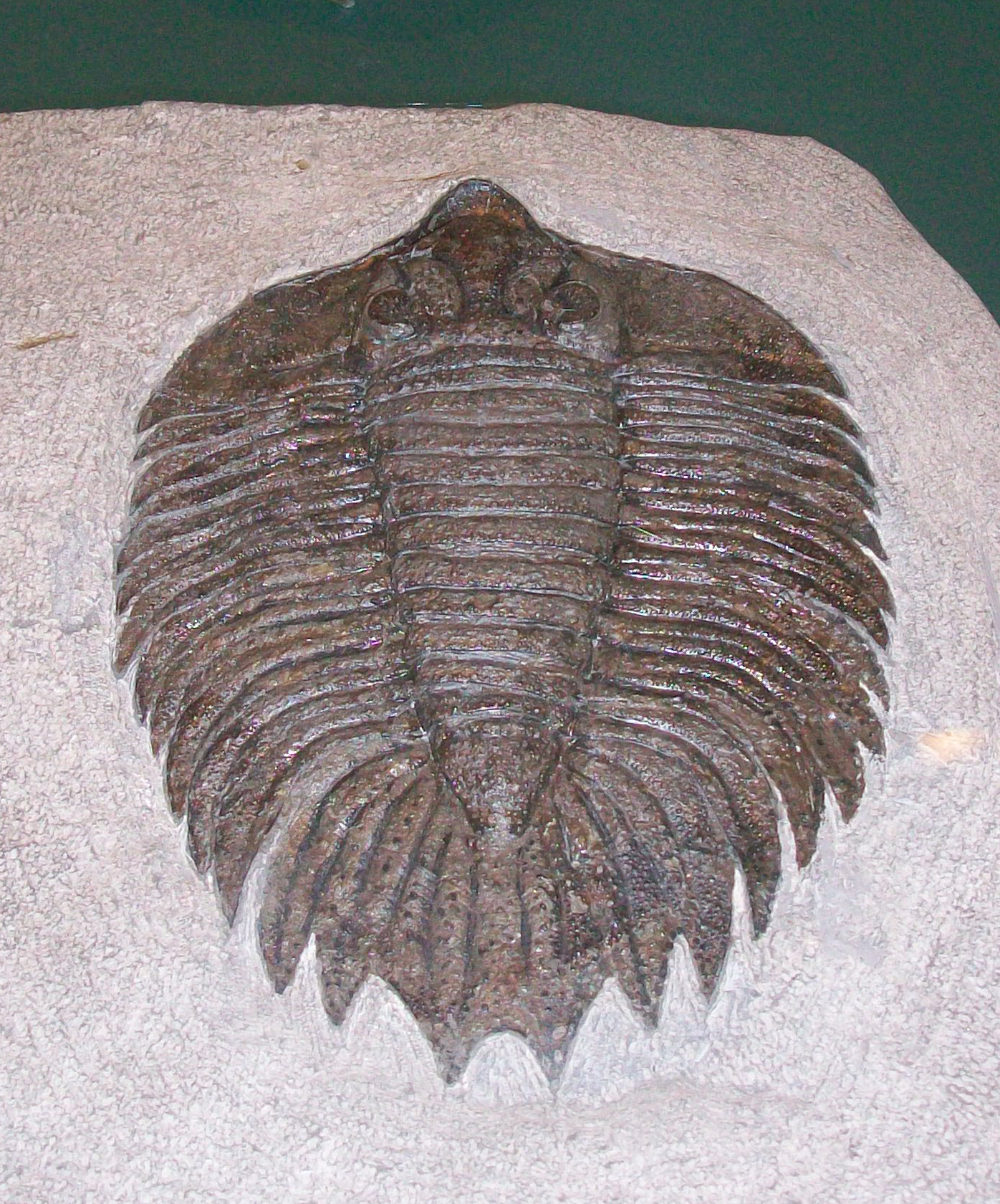
- Fossil of the Silurian trilobite Arctinurus
  †Arctinurus
  - †Arctinurus boltoni
  - †Arctinurus nereus
- Argyrotheca
  - †Argyrotheca cuneata
- †Arjamannia – tentative report
- †Arthracantha
  - †Arthracantha ithacensis
- †Arthroacantha
  - †Arthroacantha carpenteri
- †Arthroclema
- †Arthrophycus
  - †Arthrophycus alleganiensis
  - †Arthrophycus alleghaniensis
- †Arthrostylus
  - †Arthrostylus tenius
- †Asaphocinus
- †Asaphocrinus
  - †Asaphocrinus ornatus
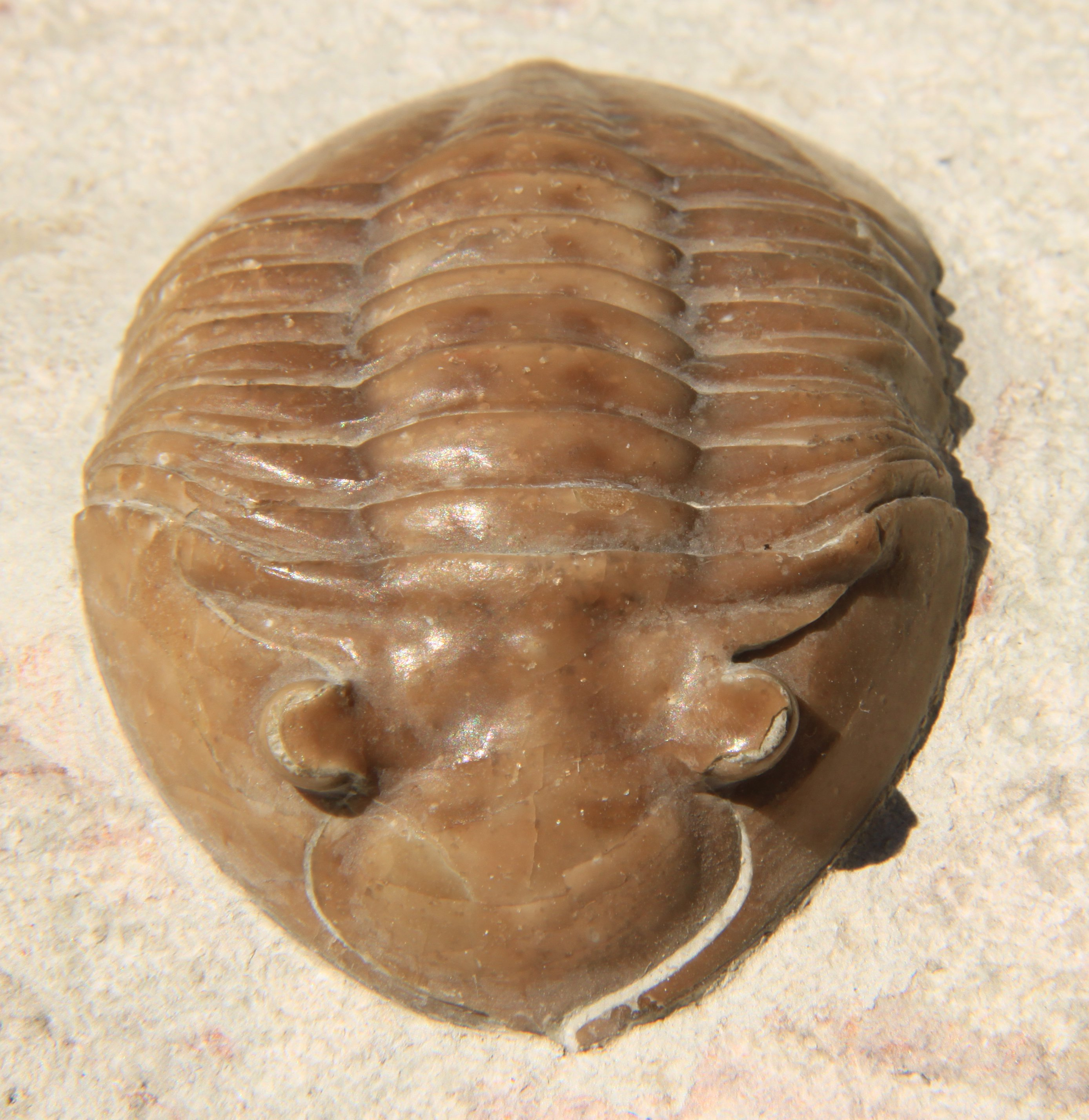
- Fossil of the Early-Middle Ordovician trilobite Asaphus
  †Asaphus
  - †Asaphus alpha
  - †Asaphus beta
  - †Asaphus gamma
- †Ascograptus
- †Asinomphalus
  - †Asinomphalus antiqua
- †Asperconella
  - †Asperconella gloriae – type locality for species
  - †Asperconella troyensis
- †Aspidocrinus
- †Asteropteris
  - †Asteropteris kopfi
- †Astraeospongium
- †Atactotoechus
  - †Atactotoechus acritus
  - †Atactotoechus kayi
- †Atalacrinus
  - †Atalacrinus arctus
- †Atelelasma
  - †Atelelasma multicosta
- †Ateleocystites
  - †Ateleocystites balanoides
- †Atelestrocrinus
- †Athabaskiella
- †Athroacantha
- †Athyris
  - †Athyris angelica
  - †Athyris cora
  - †Athyris polita
  - †Athyris spiriferiodes
  - †Athyris spiriferoides
- †Atlanticocoelia
  - †Atlanticocoelia acutiplicata
- †Atopostroma
- †Atops
- †Atractocrinus
  - †Atractocrinus kopfi
- †Atribonium
  - †Atribonium halli
- †Atrypa
  - †Atrypa gibbosa
  - †Atrypa reticularis
  - †Atrypa rugosa
- †Atrypina
  - †Atrypina diparilis
  - †Atrypina disparilis
  - †Atrypina rugosa
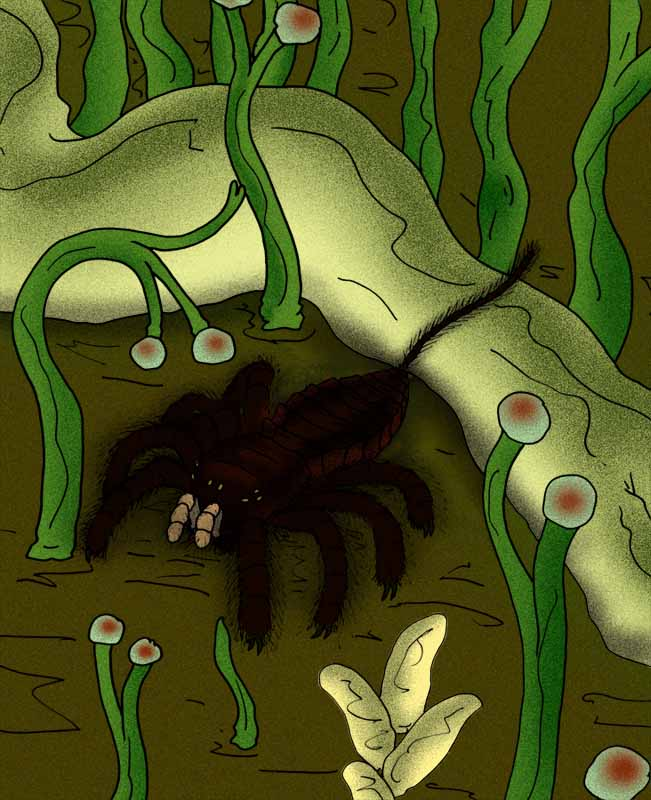
- Life restoration of the Middle Devonian arachnid Attercopus
  †Attercopus
  - †Attercopus fimbriunguis
  - †Attercopus fimbriungus
- †Aulacognathus
  - †Aulacognathus latus
- †Aulatornoceras
  - †Aulatornoceras auris
  - †Aulatornoceras eifliense
  - †Aulatornoceras paucistriatum
  - †Aulatornoceras rhysum
- †Aulocystis
  - †Aulocystis commensalis
  - †Aulocystis cooperi
  - †Aulocystis dichotoma
  - †Aulocystis jacksoni
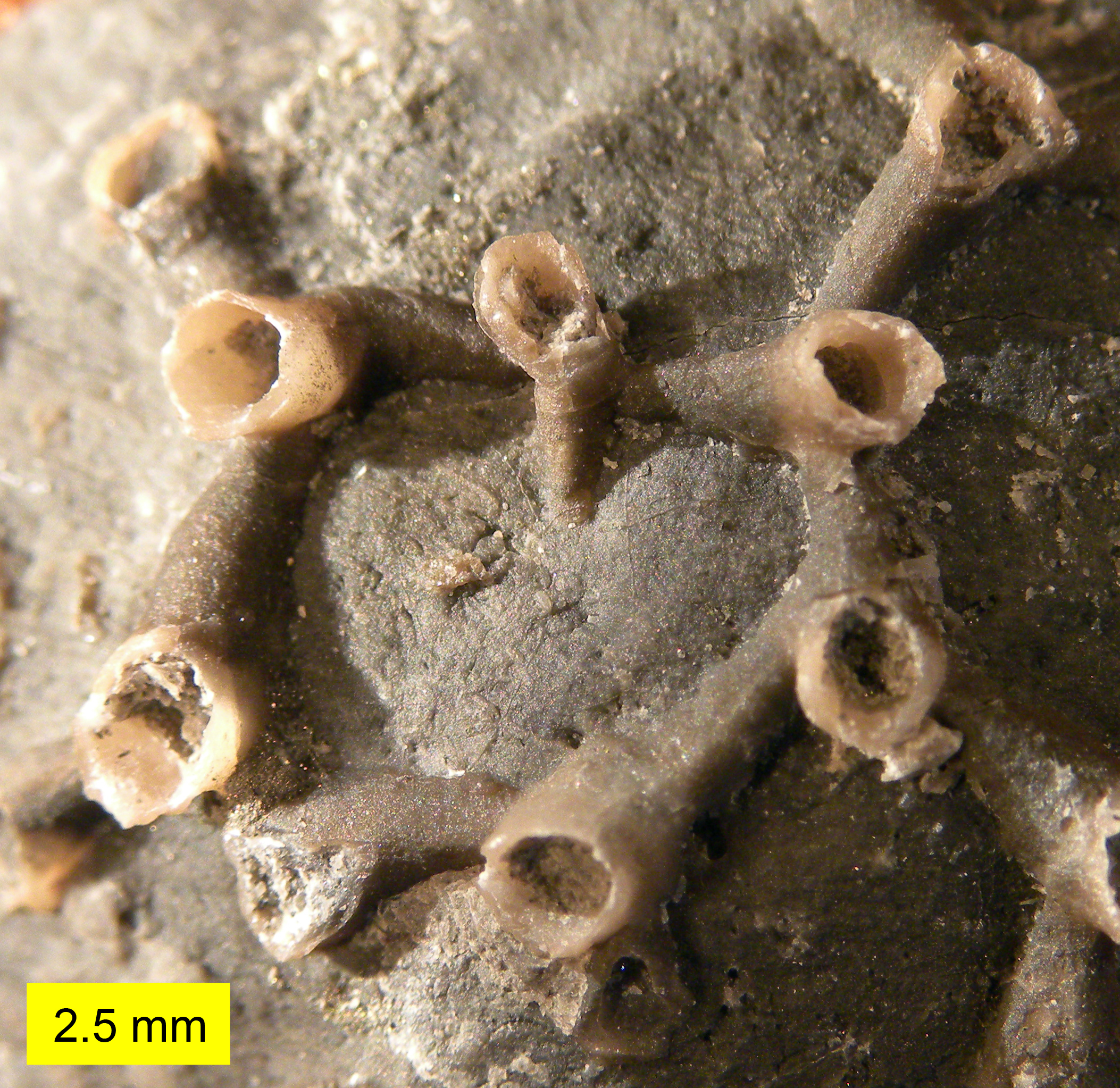
- Fossil of the Late Ordovician-Permian tabulate coral Aulopora
  †Aulopora
  - †Aulopora microbuccinata
  - †Aulopora schohariae
  - †Aulopora serpens
- †Auroraspora – or unidentified comparable form
  - †Auroraspora macromanifestus
- Avicula – tentative report
- †Aviculopecten
  - †Aviculopecten ornatus

== B ==
- †Bactrites
- †Bactrocrinites
  - †Bactrocrinites fieldi
- †Bactrotheca – report made of unidentified related form or using admittedly obsolete nomenclature
  - †Bactrotheca emmonsi
- Bairdia
  - †Bairdia summacuminata
- †Balbiniconcha
  - †Balbiniconcha hebe
- †Baltagnostus
- †Balticopora
  - †Balticopora tenuimurale
- †Baltoceras
  - †Baltoceras pusillum – tentative report
- †Barinophyton
  - †Barinophyton citrulliforme
- †Barrandeoceras
  - †Barrandeoceras natator
- †Barrandeophyllum
  - †Barrandeophyllum reimanni
  - †Barrandeophyllum simplex
- †Barroisella
  - †Barroisella campbelli – or unidentified comparable form
- †Barynema
  - †Barynema lirata
  - †Barynema multilirata
- †Basidechenella
  - †Basidechenella rowi
- †Basilicus
  - †Basilicus barrandi
  - †Basilicus whittingtoni
- †Bassleridiscus – type locality for genus
  - †Bassleridiscus mohawkensis – type locality for species
- †Bassleroceras
  - †Bassleroceras beekmanense
  - †Bassleroceras champlainense – type locality for species
  - †Bassleroceras kirbyi
  - †Bassleroceras microscopium
  - †Bassleroceras perseus
  - †Bassleroceras smithbasinense – type locality for species
  - †Bassleroceras spissiseptum
  - †Bassleroceras triangulum – type locality for species
  - †Bassleroceras vassarina – type locality for species
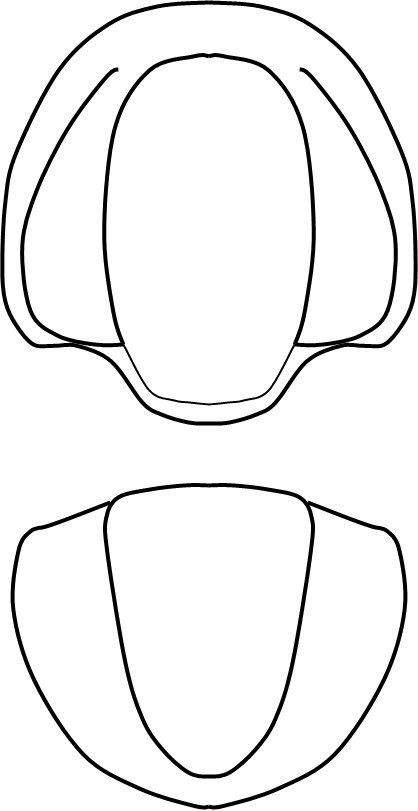
- Illustration of fossils of the Cambrian trilobite Bathydiscus
  †Bathydiscus
- †Bathyrellus
  - †Bathyrellus brevispinus
- †Bathyurellus
  - †Bathyurellus platypus
- †Bathyuriscidella
- †Bathyuriscus
- †Bathyurus
  - †Bathyurus extans
  - †Bathyurus longispinus
- †Batostoma
  - †Batostoma campensis
  - †Batostoma chazyensis
  - †Batostoma lanensis
  - †Batostoma sheldonensis
- †Batostomella
  - †Batostomella granulifera
- †Beachia
- †Beecherella
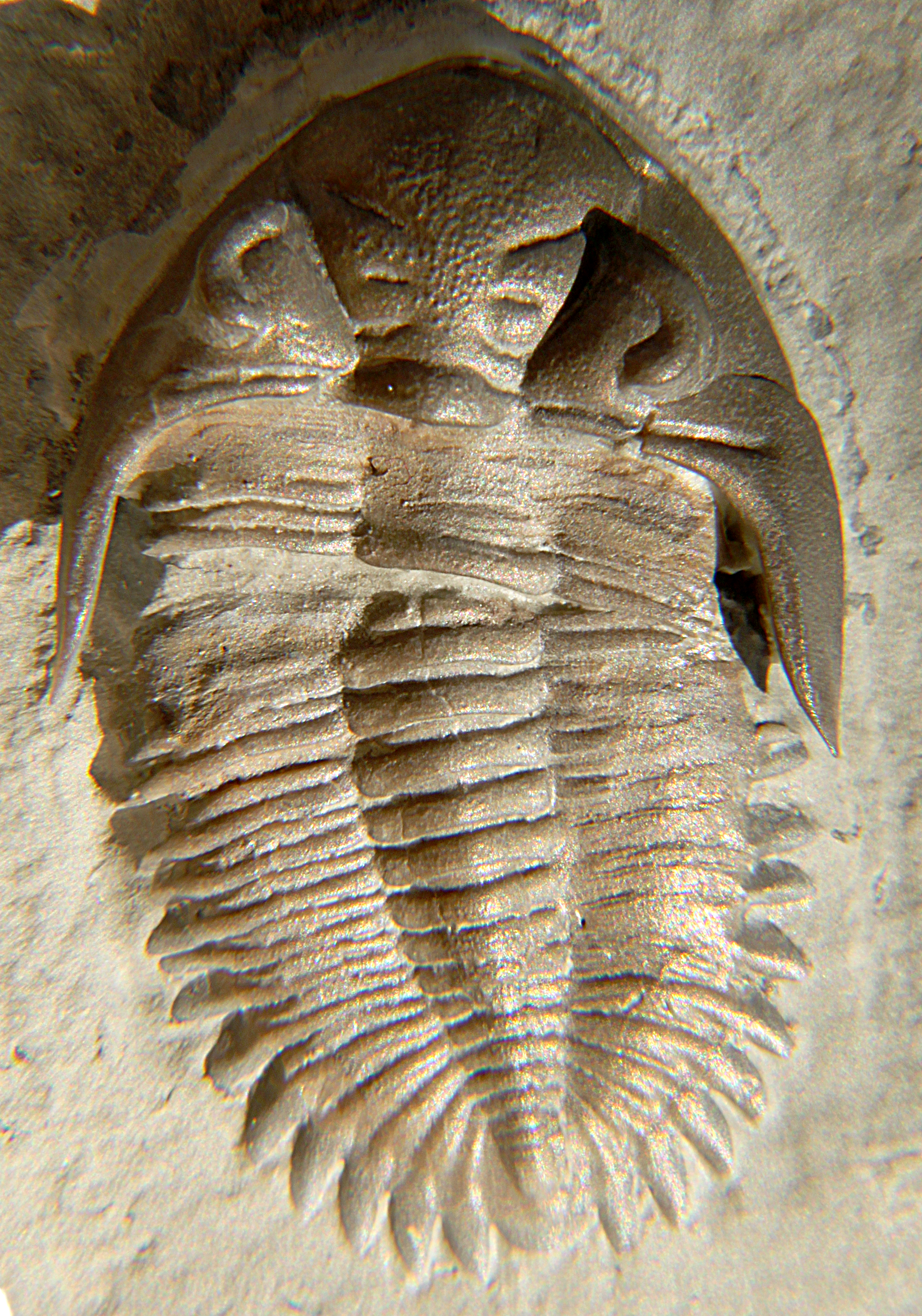
- Fossil of the Middle Devonian trilobite Bellacartwrightia
  †Bellacartwrightia
  - †Bellacartwrightia calliteles
  - †Bellacartwrightia phyllocaudata
- †Bellefontia
  - †Bellefontia gyracantha
- †Bellerophon
  - †Bellerophon helena
  - †Bellerophon pelops
  - †Bellerophon shelbiensis – type locality for species
- †Belodina
- †Bembexia
  - †Bembexia insolita – type locality for species
- †Benthamaspis
  - †Benthamaspis striata – or unidentified comparable form
- †Benthanyphyllum
- †Bergstroemognathus
  - †Bergstroemognathus extensus
- †Berounella
- †Bertiella
- †Bethanyphyllum
  - †Bethanyphyllum robustum
  - †Bethanyphyllum robustus
- †Beyrichia
  - †Beyrichia lakemontensis – or unidentified related form
  - †Beyrichia veronica
- †Bicia
- †Bideirella
  - †Bideirella reticulata
- †Bieberiana
  - †Bieberiana gowandense – type locality for species
- †Billingsestraea
  - †Billingsestraea varneuili
- †Bilobia
  - †Bilobia pisum
- †Biornatispora
  - †Biornatispora dentata
  - †Biornatispora pseudospinosa
- †Birdsallella
  - †Birdsallella catena – type locality for species
  - †Birdsallella devonica
- †Blastoidocrinus
  - †Blastoidocrinus carchariaedens
  - †Blastoidocrinus expansa
- †Blotherophyllum
- †Blothrophyllum
  - †Blothrophyllum decorticatum
  - †Blothrophyllum promiseum
  - †Blothrophyllum promissum
- †Bolaspidella
- †Bolbocephalus
- †Bolboparia
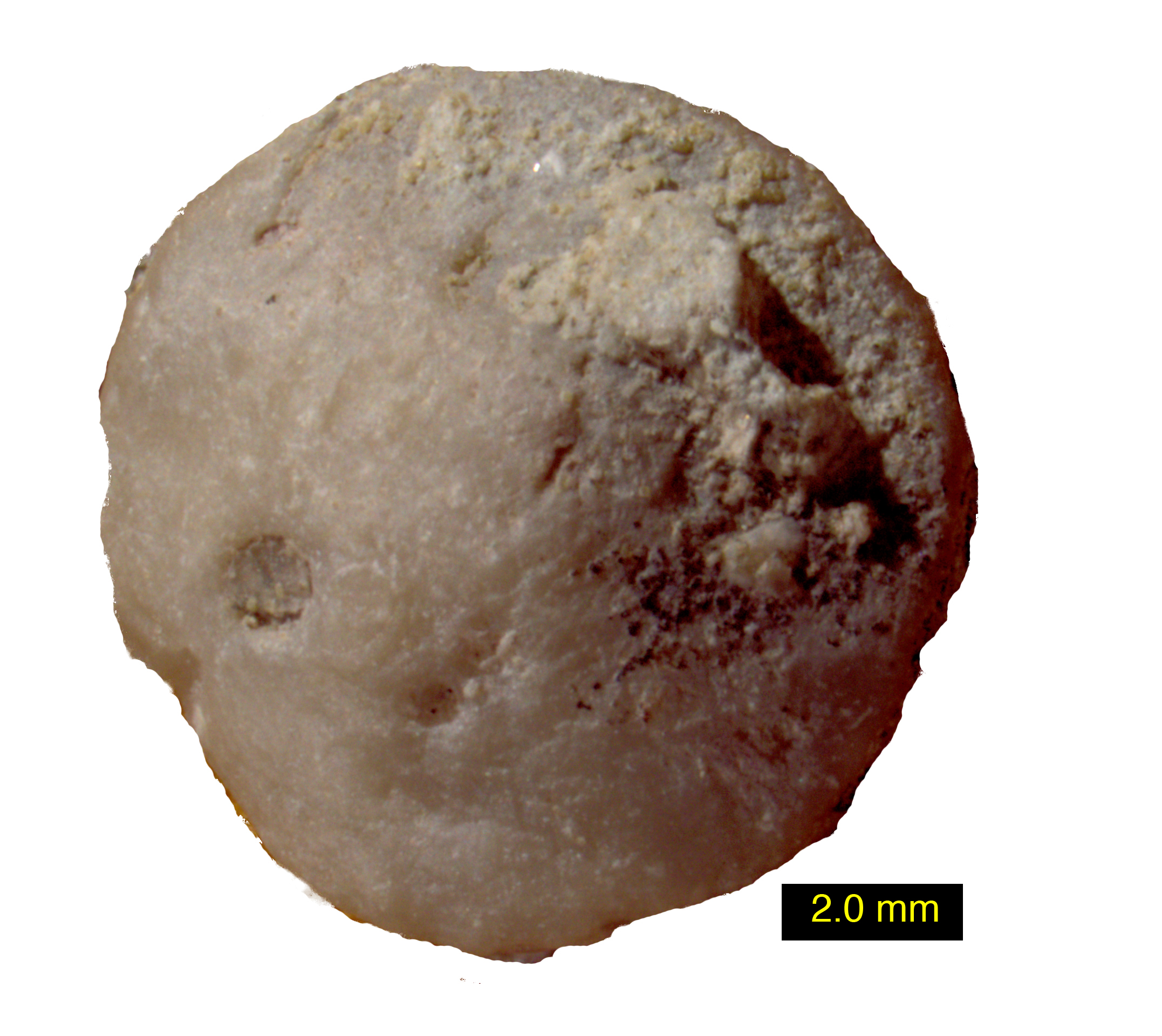
- Fossil of the Ordovician echinoderm Bolboporites
  †Bolboporites
  - †Bolboporites americanus
- †Bollia
  - †Bollia hindei
- †Bonnia
- †Botryllopora
  - †Botryllopora socialis
- †Botryocrinus
  - †Botryocrinus reimanni
- †Botsfordia
  - †Botsfordia caelata
- †Boucotinskia
  - †Boucotinskia sulcata
  - †Boucotinskia sulcatus
- †Bowmania
  - †Bowmania pennsylvanica – or unidentified comparable form
- †Brachiocrinus
  - †Brachiocrinus nodosarius
- †Brachyopterus
- †Brachyprion
- †Breenops
  - †Breenops boothi
- †Breviphrentis
  - †Breviphrentis roemeri
  - †Breviphrentis variabilis
  - †Breviphrentis yandelli
- †Briantelasma – type locality for genus
  - †Briantelasma americanum – type locality for species
  - †Briantelasma knoxboroense – type locality for species
  - †Briantelasma knoxboroensis
- †Bucanella
- †Bucania
  - †Bucania bellapuncta
  - †Bucania stigmosa
  - †Bucania sulcatina
- †Bucanopsis
- †Buchiola
  - †Buchiola retrostriata
- †Buehleroceras
  - †Buehleroceras arcuatum
  - †Buehleroceras infundibulum
  - †Buehleroceras sinuatum
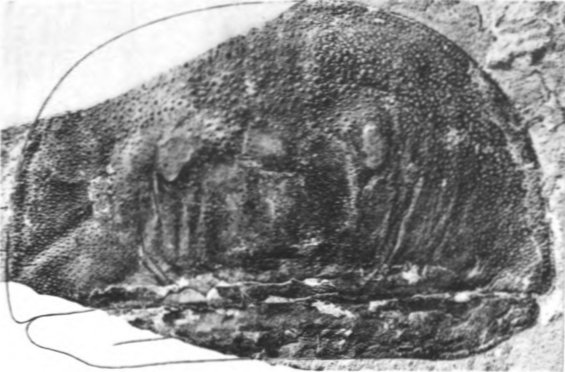
- Fossilized heads of the Silurian eurypterid ("sea scorpion") Buffalopterus
  †Buffalopterus
  - †Buffalopterus pustulosus
- †Bufina
  - †Bufina bicornuta
- †Bumastoides
  - †Bumastoides aplatus
  - †Bumastoides gardenensis
  - †Bumastoides milleri
- †Bumastus
  - †Bumastus ioxus
- †Bunaia
- †Buthograptus
  - †Buthograptus laxus
- †Buthotrephis
  - †Buthotrephis gracilis
  - †Buthotrephis palmata
  - †Buthotrephis ramosa
- †Byssonychia
  - †Byssonychia praecursa
  - †Byssonychia radiata
- Bythocypris
  - †Bythocypris cylindrica
  - †Bythocypris lucasensis
  - †Bythocypris phaseoella – type locality for species
  - †Bythocypris subquadrata
  - †Bythocypris transptyxis – type locality for species
  - †Bythocypris tubercula – type locality for species
- †Bythocyproidea
  - †Bythocyproidea eriensis – or unidentified comparable form
- †Bythopora

== C ==
- †Cabrieroceras
  - †Cabrieroceras plebeiforme
- †Cairoa
  - †Cairoa lamanekii
- †Calacanthopora
  - †Calacanthopora senticosa
- †Calamophyton
  - †Calamophyton bicephalum
- †Calamopitys
  - †Calamopitys eupuncatata
- †Calceocrinus
  - †Calceocrinus chrysalis
- †Calliocrinus
- †Callipleura
  - †Callipleura nobilis
- †Callistocrinus
  - †Callistocrinus tesselatus
- †Callixylon
  - †Callixylon erianum
  - †Callixylon petryi
  - †Callixylon Zalesskyi – or unidentified comparable form
  - †Callixylon zalesskyi
- †Callocystites
  - †Callocystites jewetti
- †Calodiscus
  - †Calodiscus lobatus
- †Calvibembexia
  - †Calvibembexia sulcomarginata
- †Calvinella – report made of unidentified related form or using admittedly obsolete nomenclature
  - †Calvinella prethoparia
- †Calymene
  - †Calymene clintoni
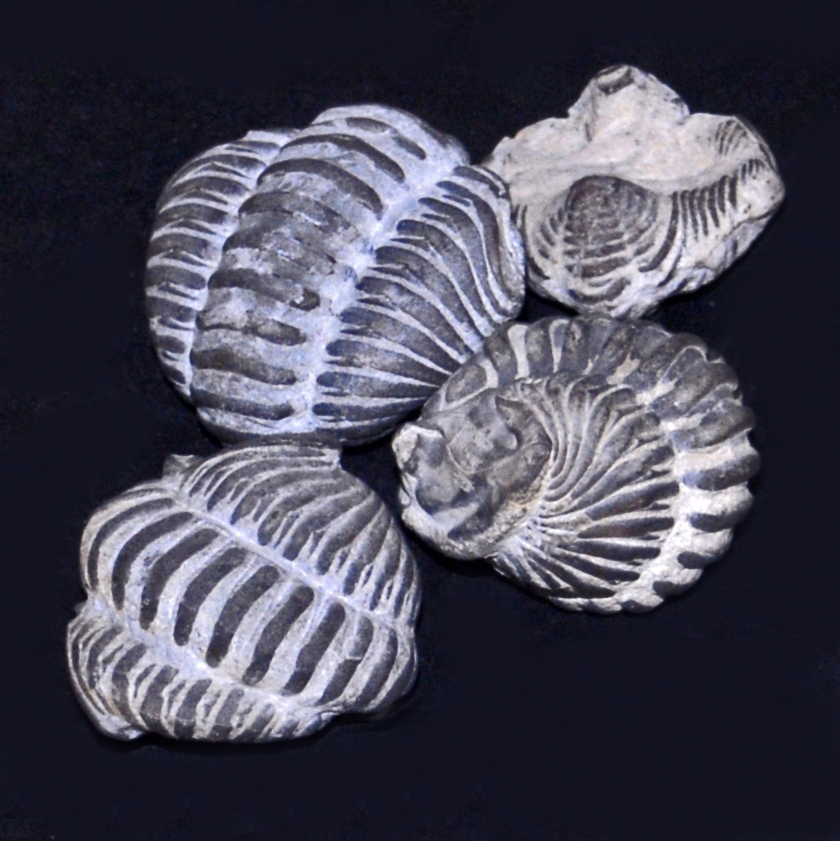
  - Fossils in enrolled posture of the Silurian trilobite Calymene niagarensis
    †Calymene niagarensis
- †Calymenella
  - †Calymenella rostrata
- †Calyptaulax
  - †Calyptaulax annulata
  - †Calyptaulax callicephalus
- †Calyptosporites – or unidentified comparable form
  - †Calyptosporites velatus
- †Camarotoechia
  - †Camarotoechia acinus
  - †Camarotoechia aequiradiata
  - †Camarotoechia altiplicata
  - †Camarotoechia billingsi
  - †Camarotoechia constricta
  - †Camarotoechia gongregata
  - †Camarotoechia humilis
  - †Camarotoechia litchfieldensis
  - †Camarotoechia navicella
  - †Camarotoechia neglecta
  - †Camarotoechia obtusiplicata
  - †Camarotoechia obtusplicata
  - †Camarotoechia pauciplicata
  - †Camarotoechia pristinus
  - †Camarotoechia robusta
  - †Camarotoechia saxatilis
  - †Camarotoechia saxatillis
  - †Camarotoechia semiplicata
  - †Camarotoechia tethys
- †Camerella
  - †Camerella varians
  - †Camerella ventricosa
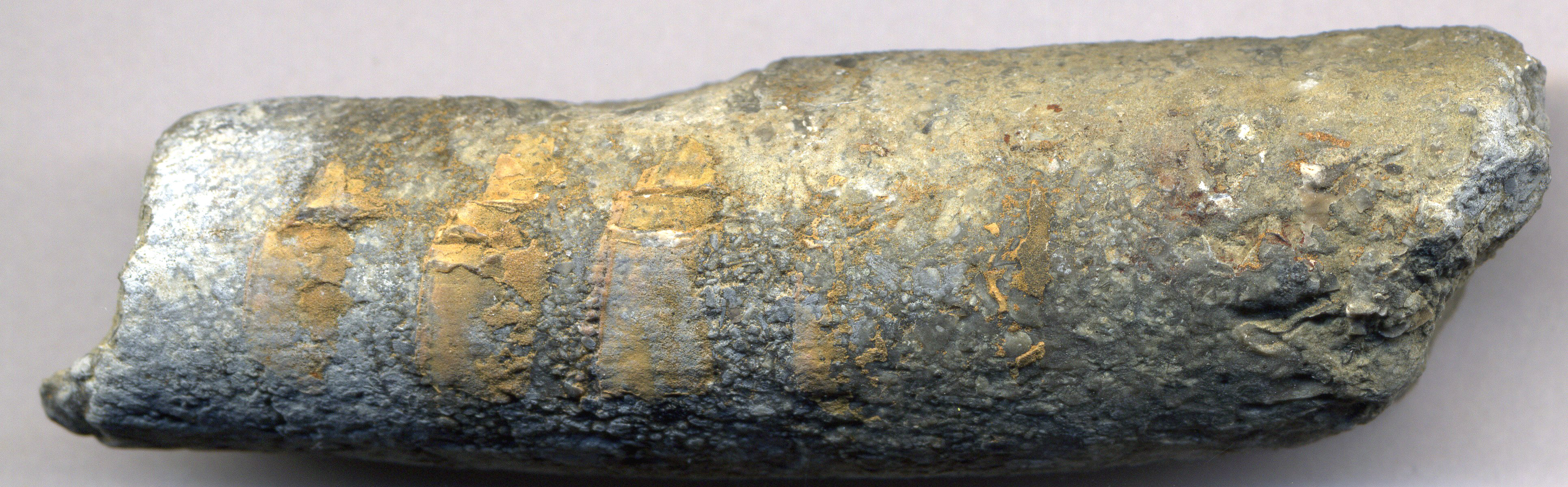
- Fossilized shell of the Middle Ordovician-Silurian nautiloid cephalopod Cameroceras
  †Cameroceras
  - †Cameroceras trentonense
- †Campbelloceras
  - †Campbelloceras rotundum
- †Caninia
  - †Caninia complexa
  - †Caninia tabulata
- †Cannapora
  - †Cannapora junciformis
- †Cannopora
  - †Cannopora junciformis
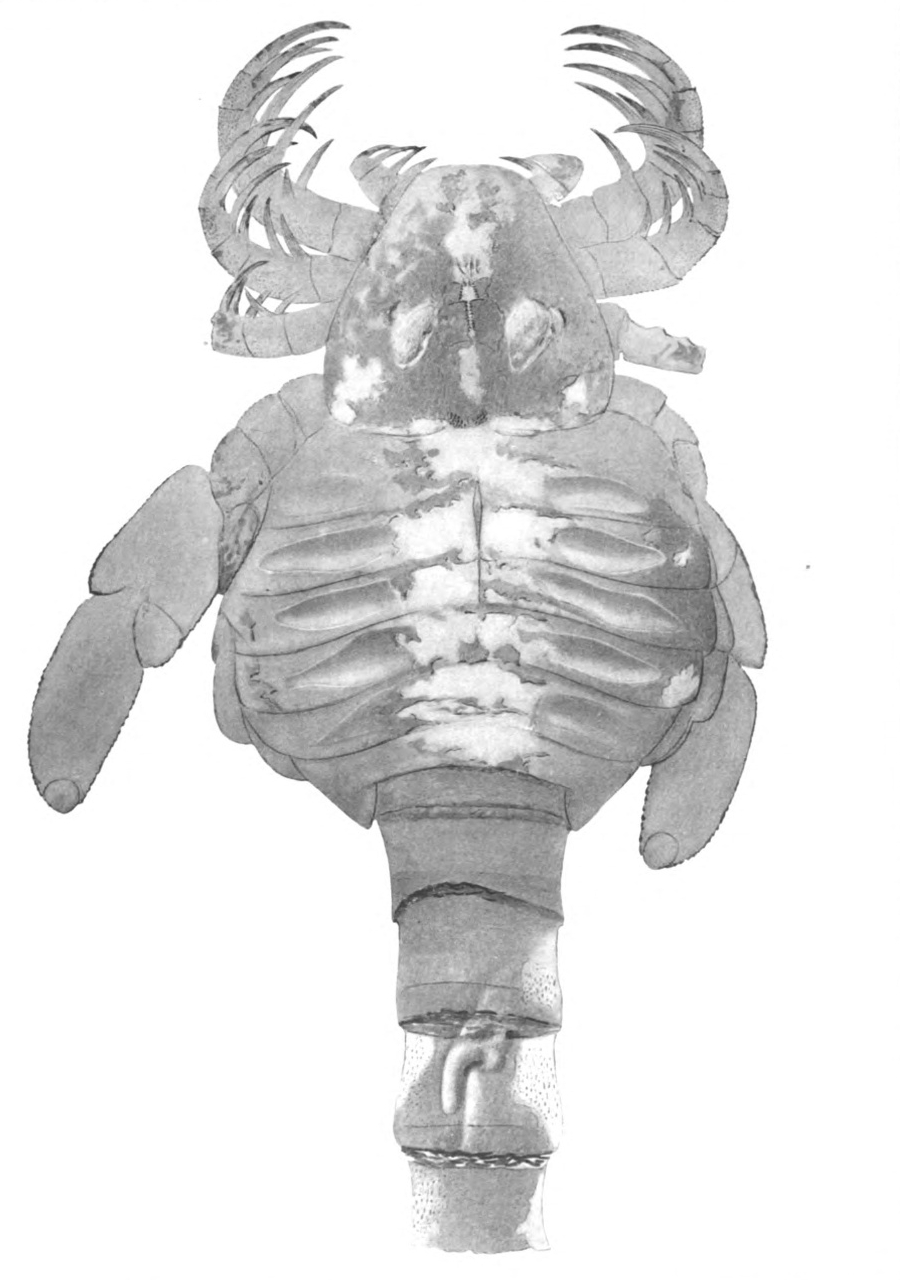
- Fossil of the Silurian eurypterid ("sea scorpion") Carcinosoma
  †Carcinosoma
  - †Carcinosoma scorpionis
  - †Carcinosoma spiniferus
- †Cardiograptus
- †Carinaropsis – type locality for genus
  - †Carinaropsis carinata – type locality for species
- †Cariniferella
  - †Cariniferella carinata
  - †Cariniferella tioga
- †Carinoceras
  - †Carinoceras vagans – type locality for species
- †Carniodus
  - †Carniodus carnulus
- †Carolinites
  - †Carolinites tasmanensis
- †Cartersoceras
  - †Cartersoceras noveboracense – type locality for species
- †Carydium
  - †Carydium bellistriata
  - †Carydium clarkei – type locality for species
  - †Carydium globularis
  - †Carydium varicosa
  - †Carydium varicosum
- †Caryocaris
- †Caryocrinites
  - †Caryocrinites ornatus
- †Caseoceras
  - †Caseoceras obesum – type locality for species
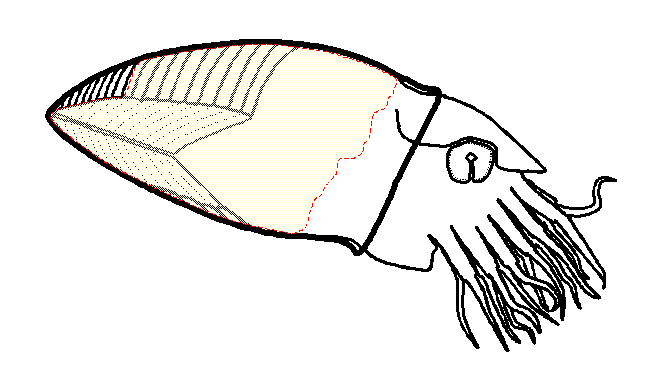
- Illustration of a fossil and restoration of the Early Ordovician nautiloid cephalopod Cassinoceras
  †Cassinoceras
  - †Cassinoceras explanator
  - †Cassinoceras grande
- †Cassowarioides
  - †Cassowarioides whitei – type locality for species
- †Casteroceras
  - †Casteroceras alternatum
- †Catatonocrinus
  - †Catatonocrinus halli
- †Catazone
  - †Catazone nevadana – or unidentified comparable form
- †Catazyga
  - †Catazyga erratica
- †Catoraphiceras
  - †Catoraphiceras cushingi
- †Caulopteris
  - †Caulopteris lockwoodi
- †Caunopora
- †Centroceras
  - †Centroceras marcellense
- †Centrocyrtoceras
  - †Centrocyrtoceras mozolai
- †Centronella
  - †Centronella gilboa
  - †Centronella glansfagea
  - †Centronella impressa
  - †Centronella lisbonensis
- †Centrotarphyceras
  - †Centrotarphyceras imperator
  - †Centrotarphyceras seelyi
- †Ceramopora
  - †Ceramopora imbricata
  - †Ceramopora imbriccata
  - †Ceramopora incrustans
  - †Ceramopora incrustus
- †Ceramoporella
- †Ceratiocaris
- †Ceratocephala
  - †Ceratocephala triacantheis
- †Ceratopea
  - †Ceratopea canadensis – type locality for species
  - †Ceratopea obtusa – type locality for species
- †Ceratopora
- †Ceraurinella
  - †Ceraurinella latipyga – type locality for species
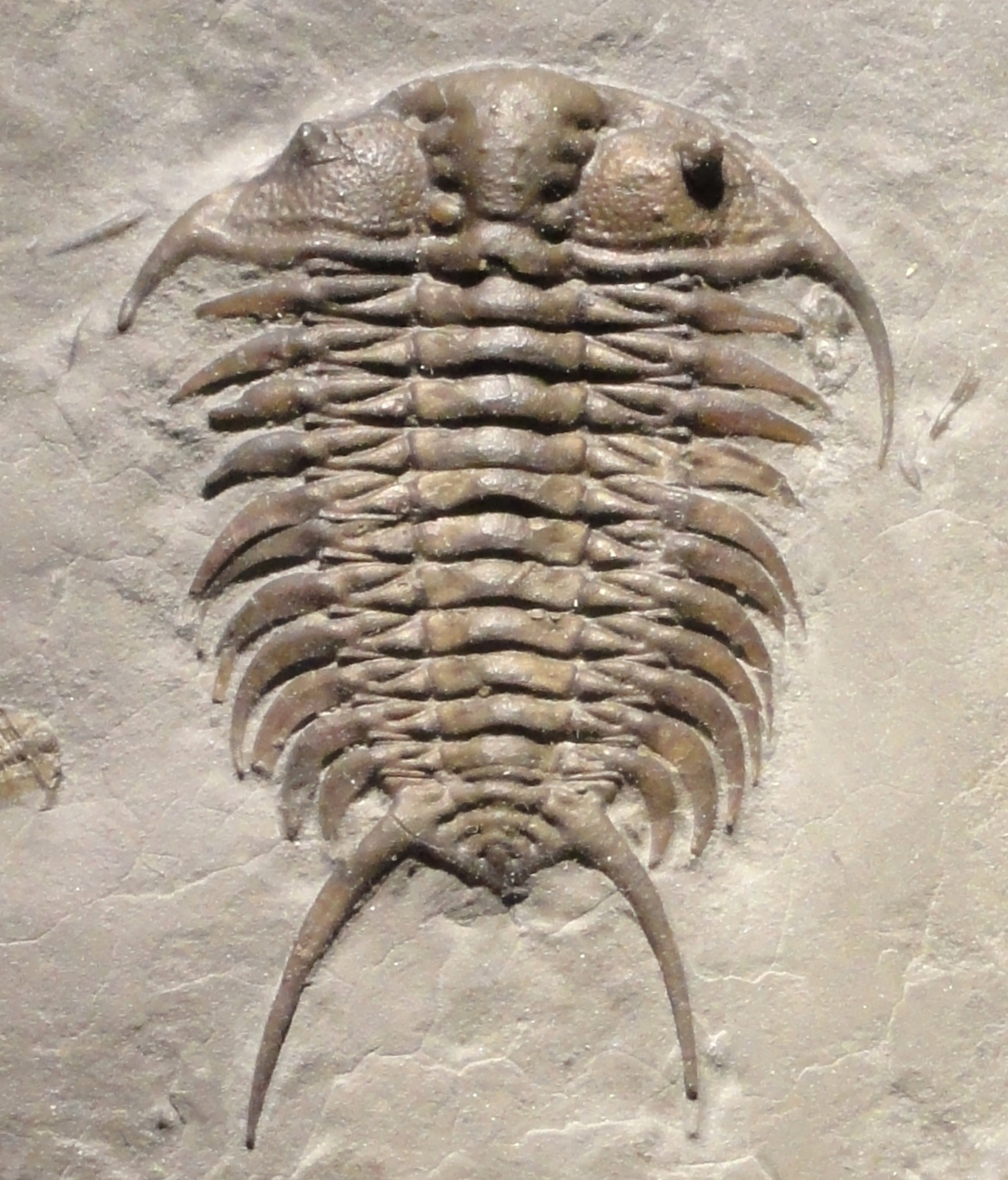
- Fossil of the Middle-Late Ordovician trilobite Ceraurus
  †Ceraurus
  - †Ceraurus hudsoni
  - †Ceraurus pleurecanthemus
  - †Ceraurus pleurexanthemus
  - †Ceraurus pleuxanthemus
  - †Ceraurus polydorus
  - †Ceraurus pompilius
- †Chaetetes
  - †Chaetetes lycoperdon
- †Champlainopora
  - †Champlainopora chazyensis
- †Chancelloria
- †Chapinella – tentative report
- †Charactocrinus
  - †Charactocrinus pustulosus
- †Charionella
  - †Charionella ovata
  - †Charionella rostrata
- †Charionoides
  - †Charionoides doris
- †Chasmatopora
  - †Chasmatopora angulata
  - †Chasmatopora angulatum
  - †Chasmatopora asperatostriata
  - †Chasmatopora asperostriata
- †Chazydictya
  - †Chazydictya chazyensis
- †Chazyoceras
  - †Chazyoceras valcourense
- †Cheiloceras
  - †Cheiloceras amblylobum
- †Cheirocrinus
  - †Cheirocrinus anatiformis
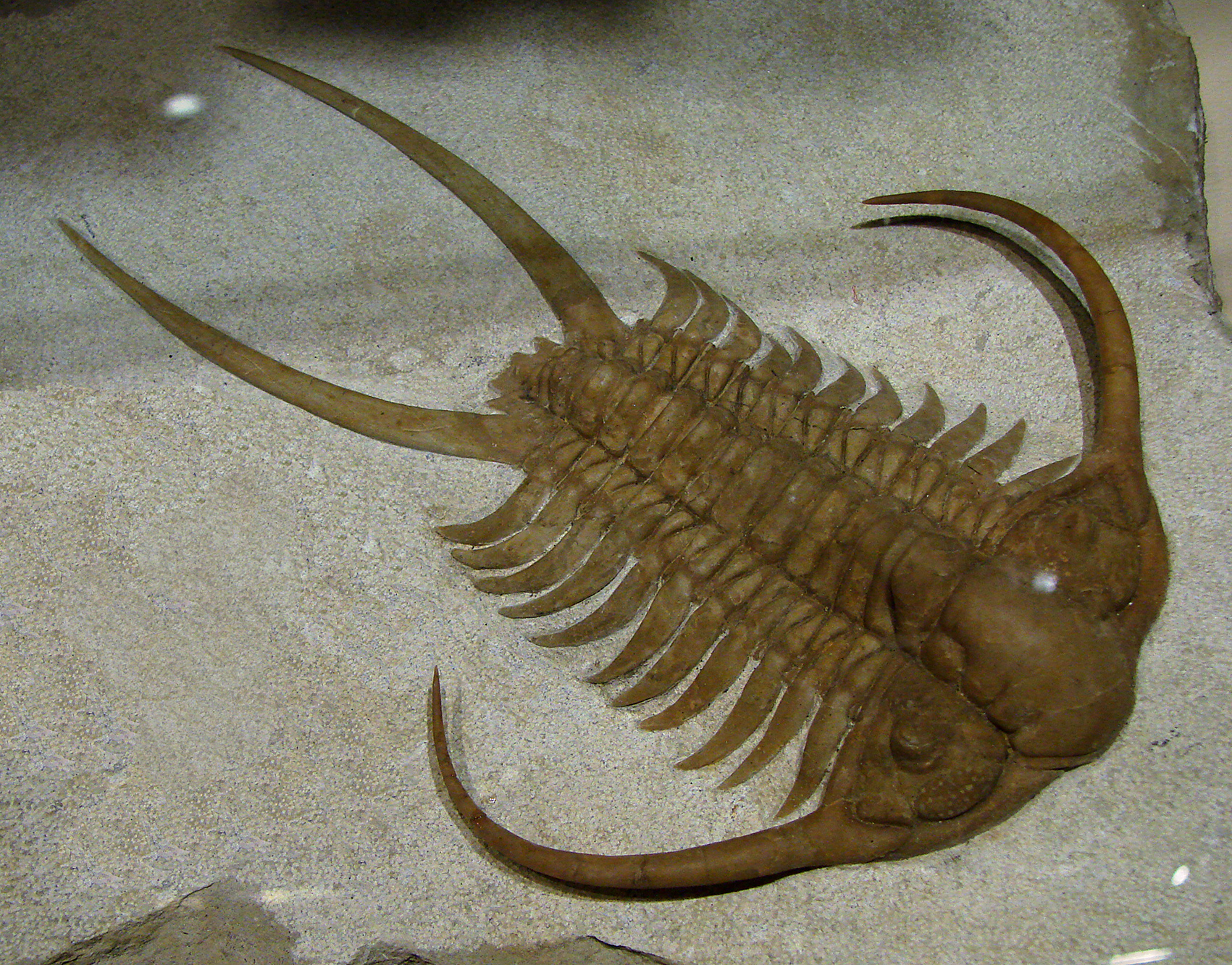
- Fossil of the Cambrian-Middle Devonian trilobite Cheirurus
  †Cheirurus
  - †Cheirurus niagarensis
- †Chilobolbina
  - †Chilobolbina hartfordensis
- †Chilotrypa
  - †Chilotrypa ostiolata
- †Chironiptrum – tentative report
  - †Chironiptrum arcuatum – type locality for species
- †Chondrites
- †Chonetes
  - †Chonetes cornutus
  - †Chonetes deflecta
  - †Chonetes ensicosta
  - †Chonetes filicostatus
  - †Chonetes hemisphericus
  - †Chonetes mucronatus
  - †Chonetes nectus – or unidentified comparable form
  - †Chonetes vicinus
- †Chonophyllum
  - †Chonophyllum magnificus
- †Chonostrophia
  - †Chonostrophia reversa
- †Chonostrophiella
- †Christiania
  - †Christiania trentonensis
- †Chutoceras
  - †Chutoceras nundaium
- †Cimitaria
  - †Cimitaria corrugata
  - †Cimitaria elongata
  - †Cimitaria recurva
- †Cincinnaticrinus
  - †Cincinnaticrinus multibrachiatus
  - †Cincinnaticrinus varibrachialis
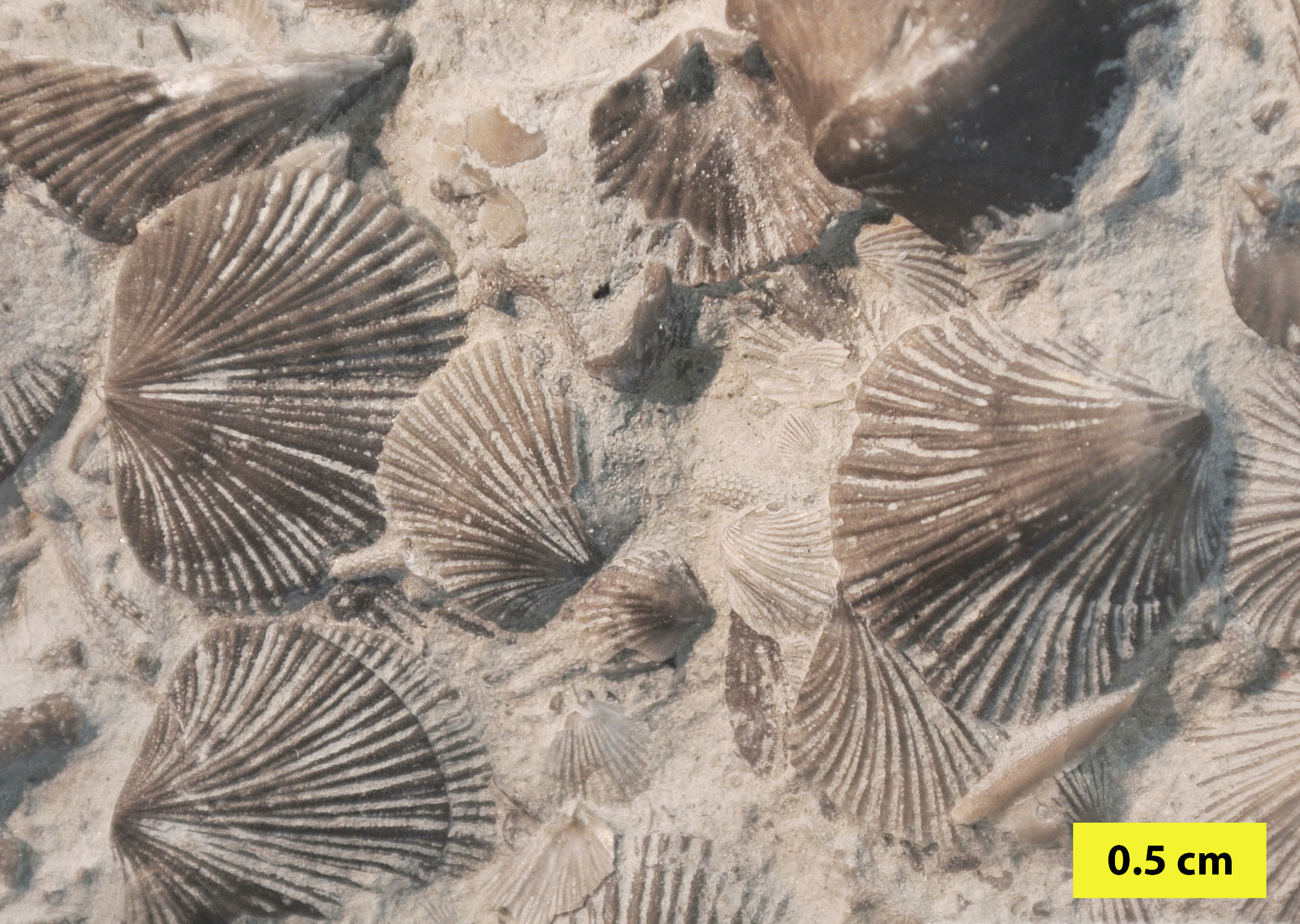
- Assemblage of fossilized shells of the Ordovician brachiopod Cincinnetina
  †Cincinnetina
  - †Cincinnetina multisecta
- †Cladochonus
  - †Cladochonus dichotoma
  - †Cladochonus jacksoni
- †Cladopora
  - †Cladopora cervicornis
  - †Cladopora fibrosa – tentative report
  - †Cladopora multipora
  - †Cladopora reticulata
  - †Cladopora seriata
- †Cladoxylon
  - †Cladoxylon dawsoni
  - †Cladoxylon hueberi
- †Clarkecrinus
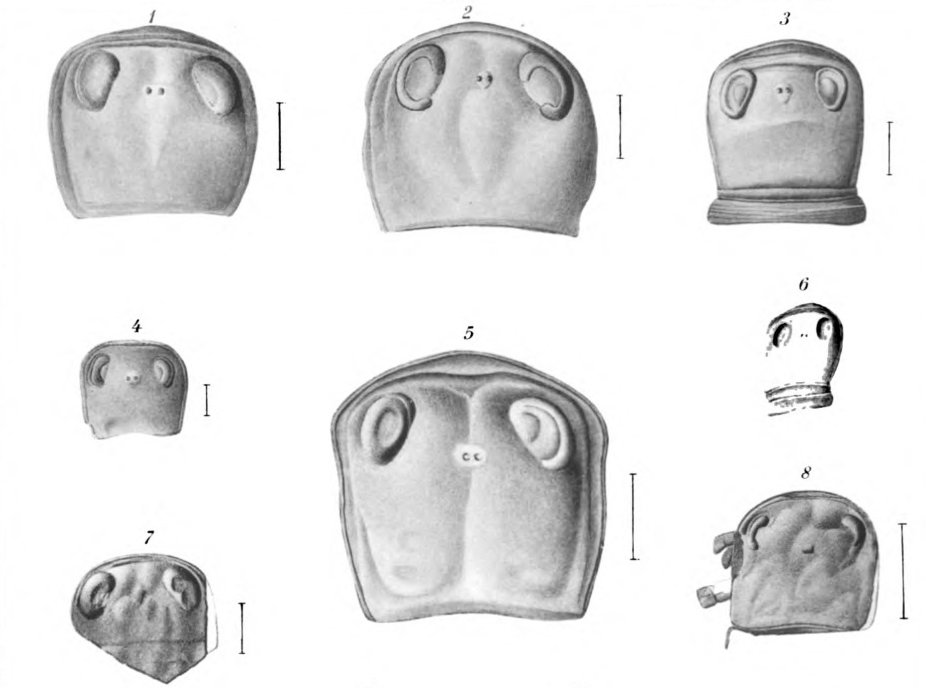
- Fossils (1-8) of the Silurian eurypterid ("sea scorpion") Clarkeipterus
  †Clarkeipterus
  - †Clarkeipterus testudineus – type locality for species
- †Clarkoceras
  - †Clarkoceras rhomboidale
  - †Clarkoceras ruedemanni
  - †Clarkoceras trapezoidale
- †Clathrodictyon
- †Clathropora
  - †Clathropora alcicornis
  - †Clathropora frondosa
- †Clathrospira
  - †Clathrospira euconica
  - †Clathrospira subconica
- †Cleionychia
  - †Cleionychia marginalis
  - †Cleionychia montrealensis
  - †Cleionychia undata
- †Clelandia
  - †Clelandia parabola
- †Clidochirus
  - †Clidochirus schucherti
- †Clidophorus
  - †Clidophorus obscurus
  - †Clidophorus planulatus
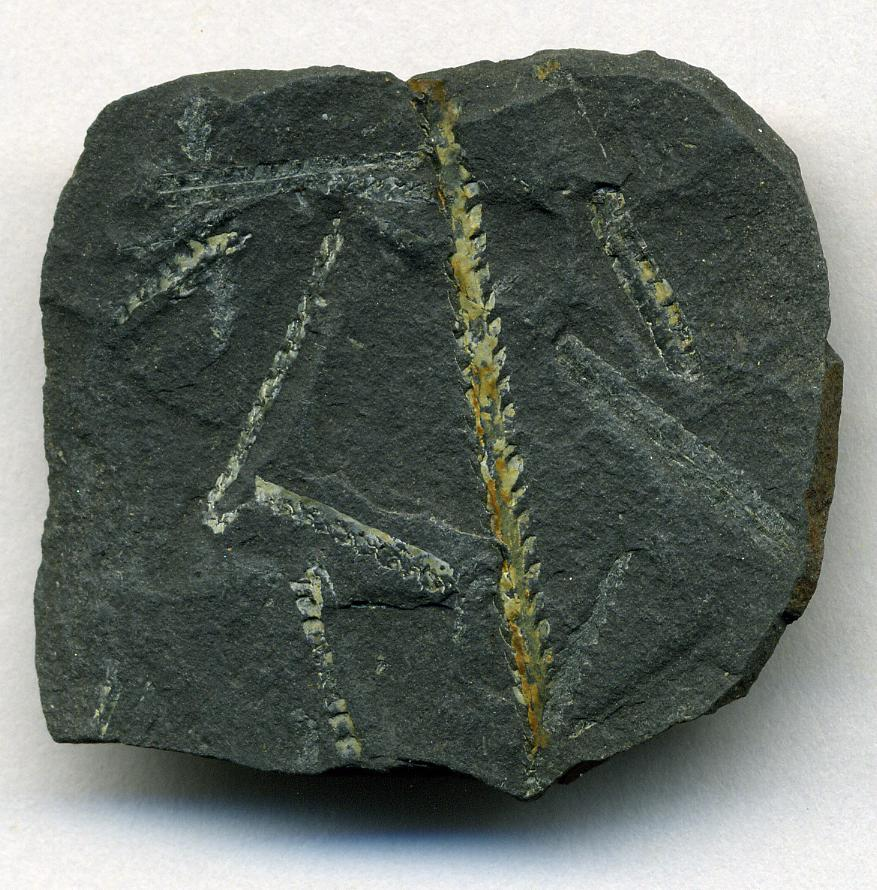
- Assemblage of fossils of the Cambrian graptolite Climacograptus
  †Climacograptus
  - †Climacograptus typicalis
- †Clintonella
  - †Clintonella vagabunda – or unidentified comparable form
- †Clionlithes
- †Clionolithes
- †Clitambonites
  - †Clitambonites multicosta
- †Clitendoceras
  - †Clitendoceras montrealense
  - †Clitendoceras saylesi
- †Clorinda
  - †Clorinda fornicata
- †Codaster
  - †Codaster pyramidatus
- †Coeloclema
  - †Coeloclema cavernosum
- †Coelonella
  - †Coelonella scapha
- †Coelospira
  - †Coelospira camilla
  - †Coelospira dichotoma
  - †Coelospira hemispherica
  - †Coelospira plicatula
  - †Coelospira sulcata
- †Coenites
- †Coenostelodictyon
  - †Coenostelodictyon jewetti
  - †Coenostelodictyon krekovi – or unidentified comparable form
- †Coenostroma
  - †Coenostroma monticuliferum – or unidentified comparable form
- †Coleolus
  - †Coleolus aciculatum
  - †Coleolus camilla
  - †Coleolus crenatocinctum
  - †Coleolus tenuicinctum
  - †Coleolus tenuicinctus
- †Colpodexylon
  - †Colpodexylon deatsii
  - †Colpodexylon trifurcatum
- †Colpomya
  - †Colpomya faba
- †Columnaria
- †Compsocrinus
  - †Compsocrinus relictus
- †Conchopeltis
  - †Conchopeltis alternata
- †Conocardium
  - †Conocardium denticulatum – type locality for species
- †Conocephalina
  - †Conocephalina whitehallensis – type locality for species
- †Conocerina
  - †Conocerina reducta
- †Conostichnus
- †Conotheca
  - †Conotheca australiensis – type locality for species
- †Conotreta
  - †Conotreta rusti – type locality for species
- †Conularia
  - †Conularia longa
  - †Conularia niagarensis
  - †Conularia trentonensis
  - †Conularia triangularis
  - †Conularia triangulata
  - †Conularia undulata
- †Conularid
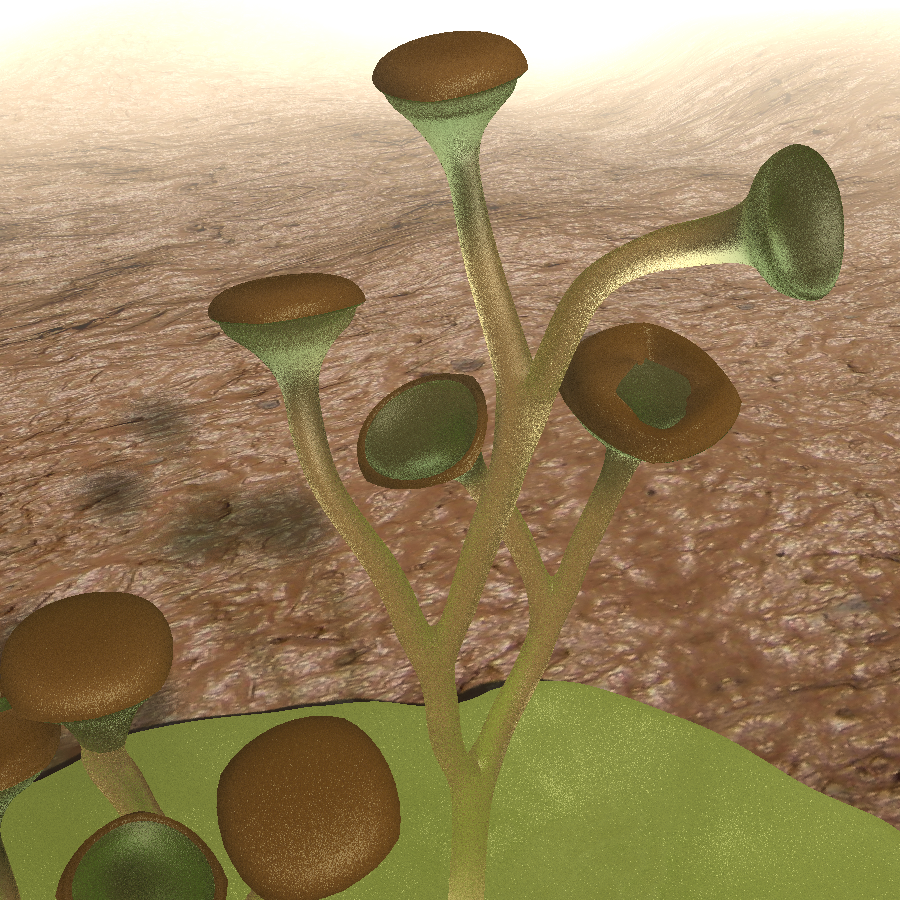
- Life restoration of the Silurian-Early Devonian primitive land plant Cooksonia
  †Cooksonia
  - †Cooksonia hemisphaerica – or unidentified comparable form
- †Coolinia
  - †Coolinia subplana
  - †Coolinia tnuis
- †Cordatomyonia
  - †Cordatomyonia shupei
- †Cordylocrinus
  - †Cordylocrinus plumosus
  - †Cordylocrinus ramulosus
- †Cordylodus
  - †Cordylodus angulatus
  - †Cordylodus caseyi
  - †Cordylodus proavus
- †Cornellites
  - †Cornellites chemungensis
  - †Cornellites emaceratum
  - †Cornellites emaceratus
  - †Cornellites fasciculata
  - †Cornellites flabella
  - †Cornellites flabellum
  - †Cornellites flubella
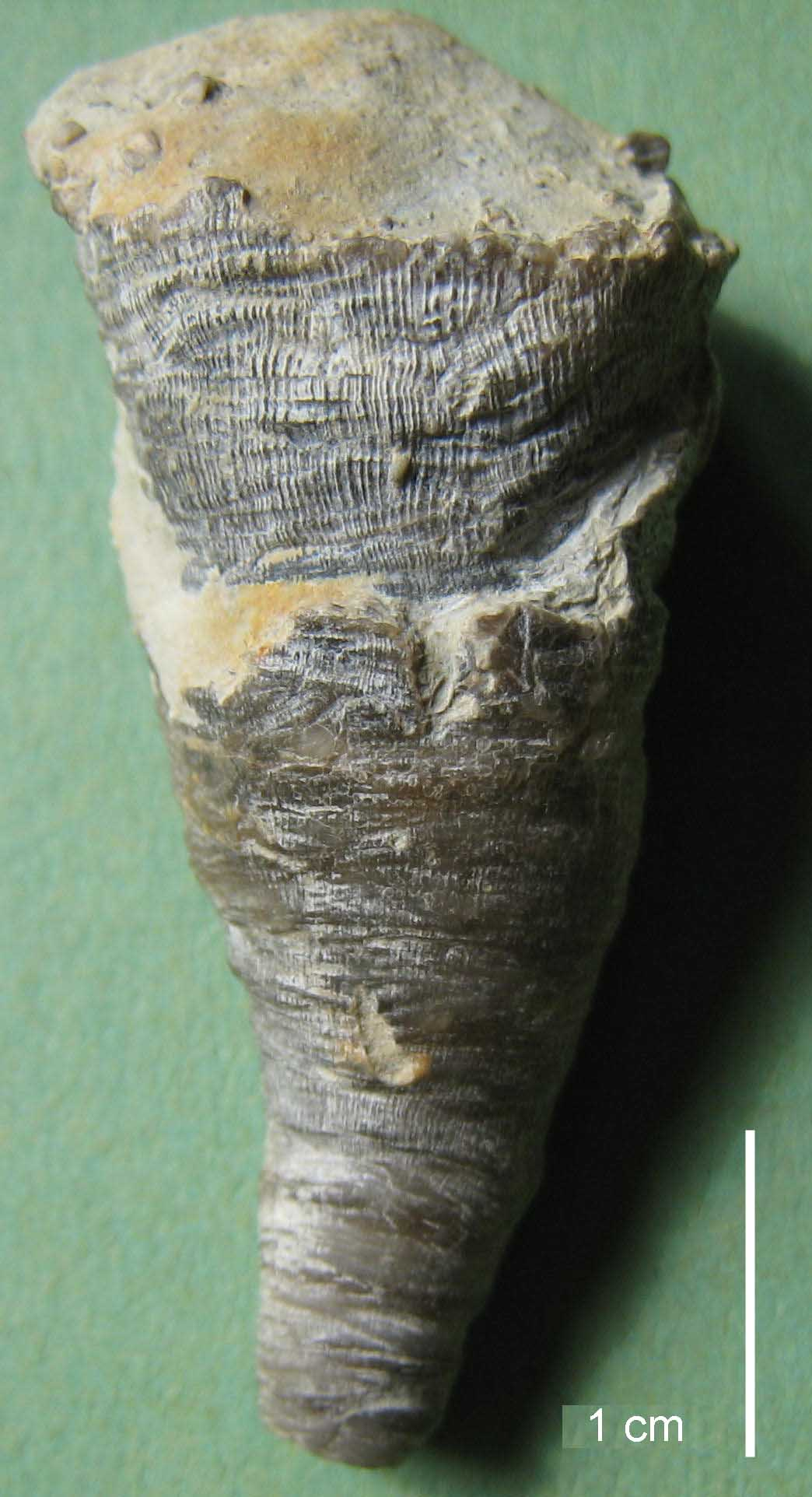
- Fossil of the Middle Ordovician-Carboniferous horn coral Cornulites
  †Cornulites
  - †Cornulites bellistriatus
  - †Cornulites distans
  - †Cornulites flexuosus
  - †Cornulites niagarensis
- †Cornuproetus
  - †Cornuproetus beecheri
- †Coronocrinus
  - †Coronocrinus polydactylus
- †Corynexochides – tentative report
- †Corynoides
- †Corynotrypa
  - †Corynotrypa dissimilis
- †Costalocrinus
  - †Costalocrinus rex – type locality for species
  - †Costalocrinus sentosus
- †Costellirorstra
  - †Costellirorstra peculiaris – or unidentified comparable form
- †Costellirostra
- †Costellispirifer
- †Costispirifer
  - †Costispirifer arenosa – or unidentified comparable form
  - †Costispirifer arenosus
- †Costistricklandia
  - †Costistricklandia gaspeensis
  - †Costistricklandia lirata
- †Costulatostyliolina
- †Cotteroceras
- †Cranaena
  - †Cranaena eudora
  - †Cranaena lincklaeni
  - †Cranaena linklaen
  - †Cranaena linklaeni
  - †Cranaena navicella
  - †Cranaena romingeri
  - †Cranaena subalobosa
- Crania
  - †Crania crenistriata
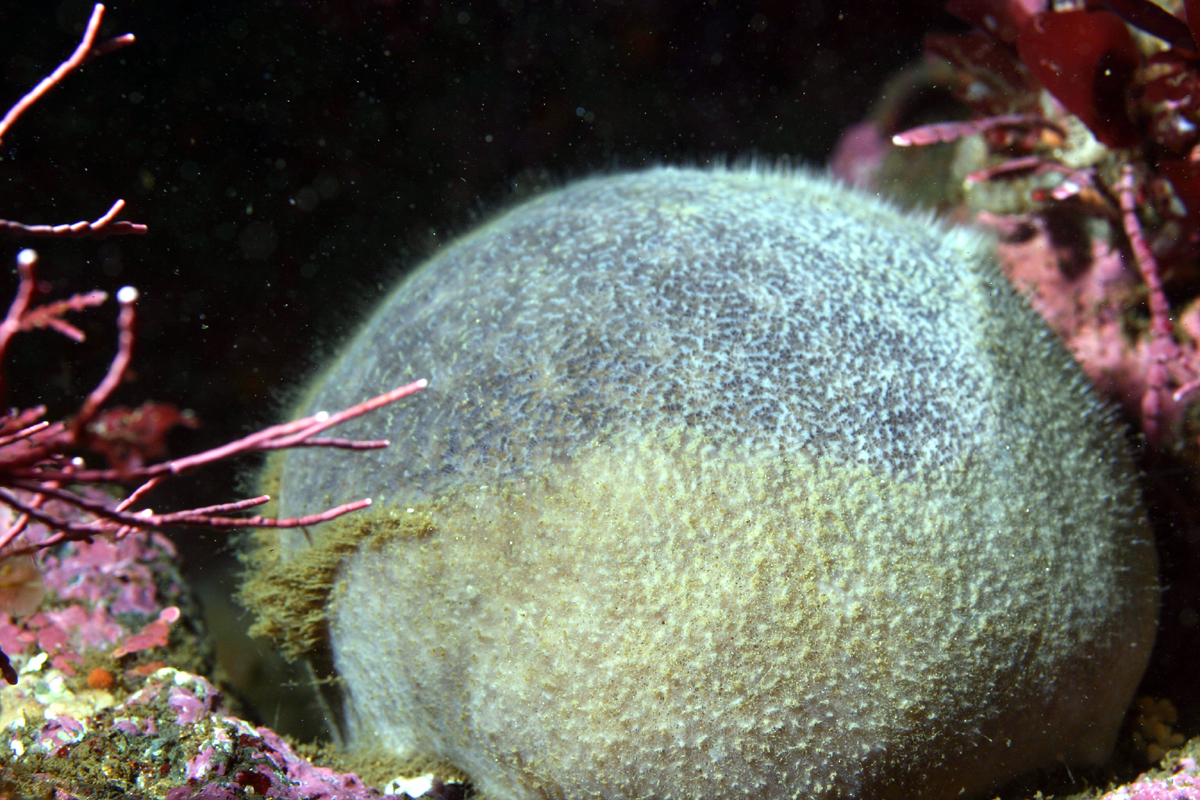
- A living Craniella sponge
  Craniella
  - †Craniella hamiltoniae
- †Craniops
  - †Craniops hamiltoniae
  - †Craniops linguiformis
  - †Craniops squammiformis
- †Crassotornoceras
  - †Crassotornoceras crassum – or unidentified related form
- †Crenistriella
  - †Crenistriella crenistria
  - †Crenistriella rotalinea
- †Crickites
  - †Crickites lindneri
- †Crinobrachiatus
  - †Crinobrachiatus brachiatus
- †Crinoid
  - †Crinoid anchors
- †Cristodus
  - †Cristodus loxoides
- †Crownopora
- †Crurispina
  - †Crurispina nana
  - †Crurispina spinosa
- †Cryptograptus
- †Cryptolithus
  - †Cryptolithus bellulus
  - †Cryptolithus lorettensis
  - †Cryptolithus tesselatus
- †Cryptonella
  - †Cryptonella planirostra
  - †Cryptonella planirostrata
  - †Cryptonella rectirostra
  - †Cryptonella rectirostrata
- †Cryptophyllus
  - †Cryptophyllus arsinius – type locality for species
- †Ctenacaronychus – type locality for genus
  - †Ctenacaronychus nortoni – type locality for species
- †Ctenocrinus
  - †Ctenocrinus nobilissimus
  - †Ctenocrinus pachydactylus
  - †Ctenocrinus stoloniferus
- †Ctenodonta
  - †Ctenodonta bidorsata
  - †Ctenodonta dubia
  - †Ctenodonta dubiaformis
  - †Ctenodonta elliptica
  - †Ctenodonta lata
  - †Ctenodonta limbata
  - †Ctenodonta machaeriformis
  - †Ctenodonta mactriformis
  - †Ctenodonta peracuta
  - †Ctenodonta salinensis
- †Ctenoloculina
  - †Ctenoloculina cicatricosa
  - †Ctenoloculina eurybathrota
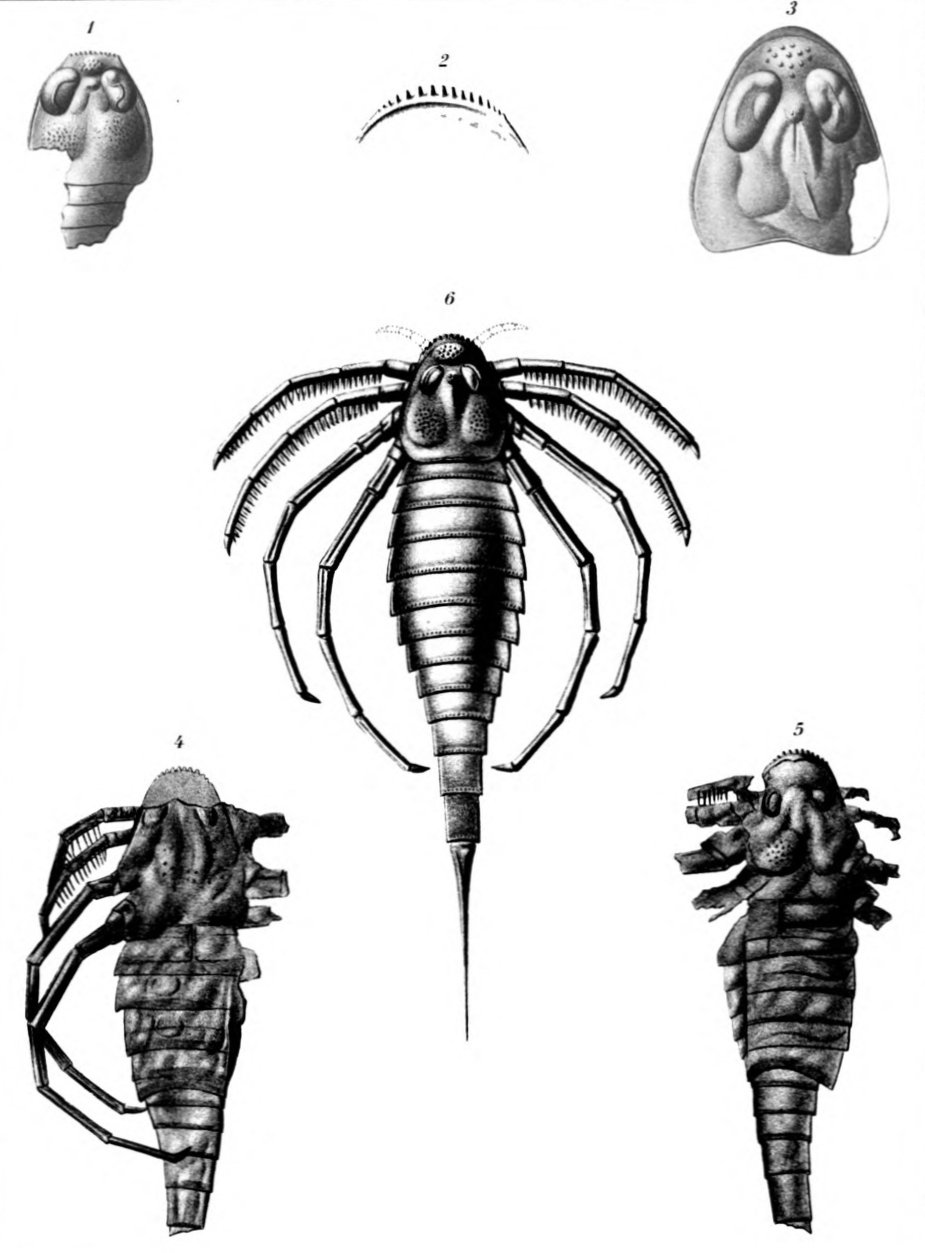
- Fossils and life restoration of the Silurian eurypterid ("sea scorpion") Ctenopterus
  †Ctenopterus
  - †Ctenopterus cestrotus
- †Cuneamya
  - †Cuneamya alveata
  - †Cuneamya cuneata
  - †Cuneamya elliptica
- †Cupularostrum
  - †Cupularostrum congregata
  - †Cupularostrum contracta
  - †Cupularostrum dotis
  - †Cupularostrum exima
  - †Cupularostrum eximia
  - †Cupularostrum horsfordi
  - †Cupularostrum orbicularis – tentative report
  - †Cupularostrum prolifica
  - †Cupularostrum stevensi
- †Cupulocorona
  - †Cupulocorona gemmiformis
- †Cupulocrinus
  - †Cupulocrinus gracilus
- †Cupulorostrum
  - †Cupulorostrum congregata
  - †Cupulorostrum dotis
  - †Cupulorostrum horsfordi
  - †Cupulorostrum prolifica
  - †Cupulorostrum sappho
- †Curtoceras
  - †Curtoceras eatoni
  - †Curtoceras internistriatum
- †Cyathocylindrium
- †Cyathodictya – tentative report
- †Cyathophyllum
- †Cybele
  - †Cybele prima
  - †Cybele primus
- †Cybeloides
  - †Cybeloides prima
- †Cyclonema
  - †Cyclonema cancellatum
  - †Cyclonema leptonotum
  - †Cyclonema varicasum
  - †Cyclonema varicosum
- †Cyclora
  - †Cyclora subulata
- †Cyclostomiceras
  - †Cyclostomiceras cassinense
- †Cylindrophyllum
- †Cymatonota
  - †Cymatonota raricosta
  - †Cymatonota undatum
- †Cymostrophia
  - †Cymostrophia patersoni
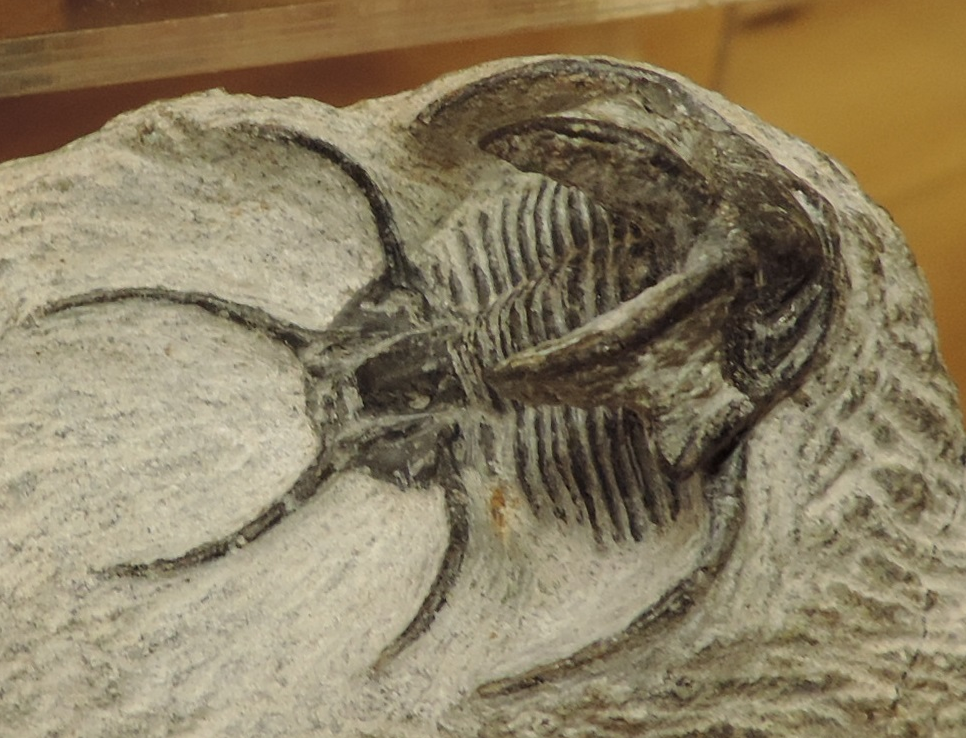
- Fossil of the Late Ordovician-Late Devonian trilobite Cyphaspis
  †Cyphaspis
- †Cypricardella
  - †Cypricardella bellastriata
  - †Cypricardella bellistriata
  - †Cypricardella complana
  - †Cypricardella complanata
  - †Cypricardella complanatus
  - †Cypricardella crassa
  - †Cypricardella gregaria
  - †Cypricardella laroquei
  - †Cypricardella marylandica
  - †Cypricardella tenuistriata
  - †Cypricardella tenuistriatus
- †Cypricardina
- †Cypricardinea
  - †Cypricardinea indenta
- †Cypricardinia
  - †Cypricardinia indenta
  - †Cypricardinia undulostriata
- †Cypricordella
  - †Cypricordella tenuistriata
- †Cyrtactinoceras
  - †Cyrtactinoceras boycii
  - †Cyrtactinoceras champlainense
- †Cyrtia
  - †Cyrtia exporrecta
  - †Cyrtia meta
  - †Cyrtia pyramidalis
- †Cyrtina
  - †Cyrtina dalmani – or unidentified comparable form
  - †Cyrtina hamiltonensis
  - †Cyrtina hamiltoniae
  - †Cyrtina pyramidalis
  - †Cyrtina recta
  - †Cyrtina rostrata
  - †Cyrtina varia – or unidentified comparable form
- †Cyrtinoides
  - †Cyrtinoides eliei
- †Cyrtobaltoceras
  - †Cyrtobaltoceras gracile
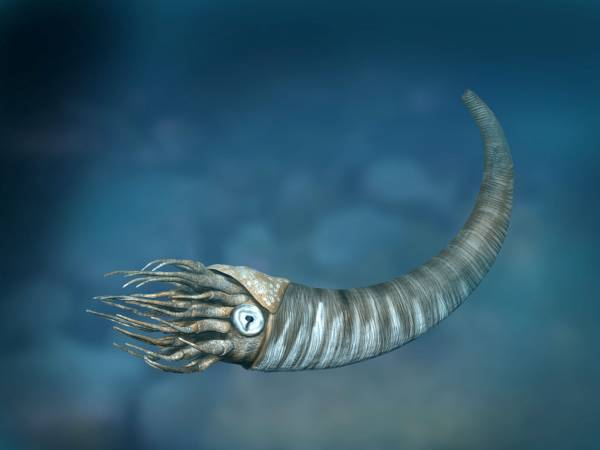
- Restoration of the Cambrian-Middle Devonian nautiloid cephalopod Cyrtoceras
  †Cyrtoceras
  - †Cyrtoceras eugenium
  - †Cyrtoceras kirkbyi – tentative report
  - †Cyrtoceras subcancellatum
- †Cyrtodonta
  - †Cyrtodonta alata
  - †Cyrtodonta scala
  - †Cyrtodonta solitaria
- †Cyrtodontula
  - †Cyrtodontula ventricosa
- †Cyrtolites
  - †Cyrtolites ornatus
  - †Cyrtolites pileolus
  - †Cyrtolites type locality for species – informal
- †Cyrtonella
  - †Cyrtonella mitella
- †Cyrtorizoceras
  - †Cyrtorizoceras rusti – type locality for species
- †Cyrtospira
  - †Cyrtospira raymondi
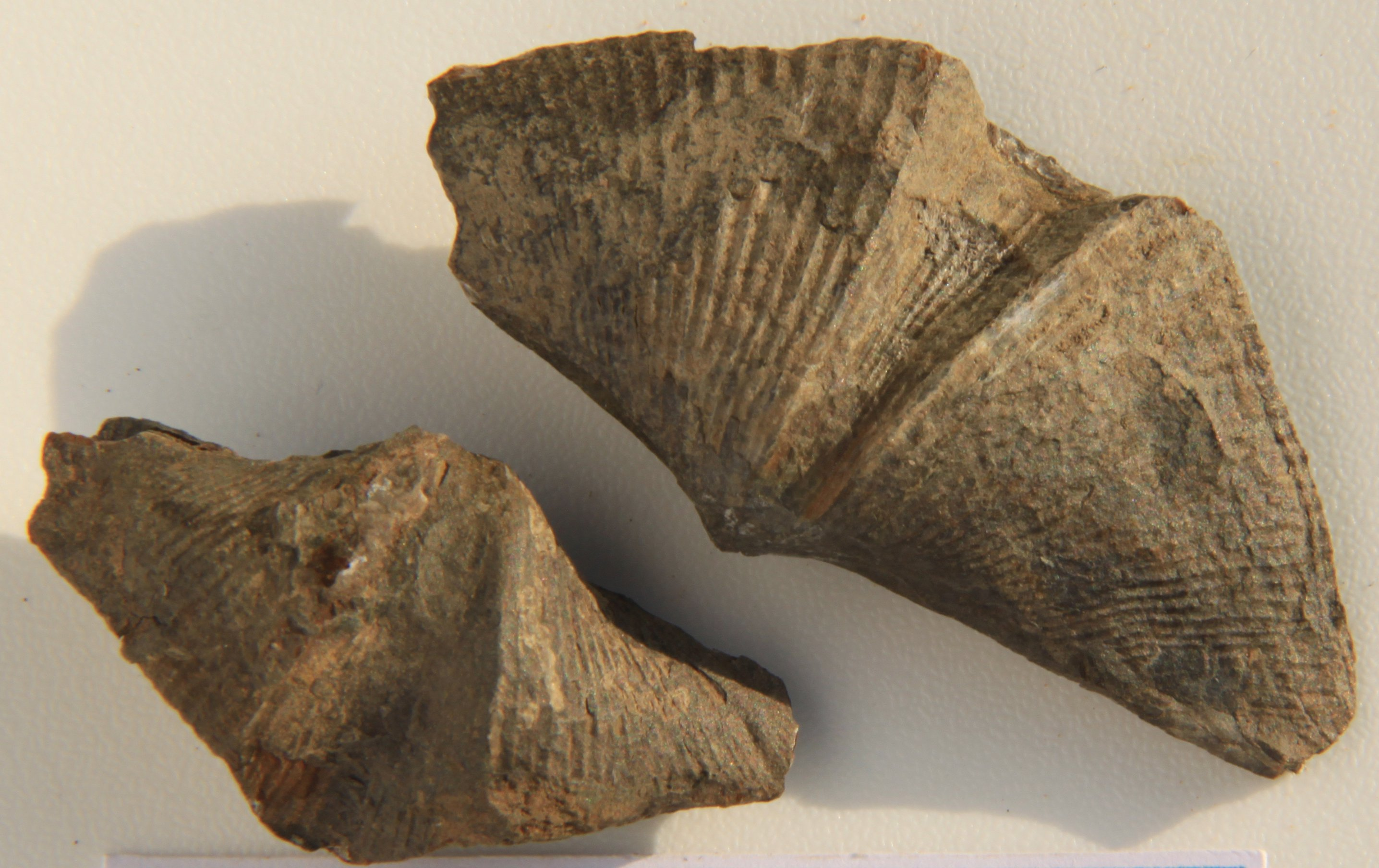
- Fossilized shells of the Middle-Late Devonian brachiopod Cyrtospirifer
  †Cyrtospirifer
  - †Cyrtospirifer alti
  - †Cyrtospirifer altiplicatus
  - †Cyrtospirifer augusticardinalis
  - †Cyrtospirifer chemungensis
  - †Cyrtospirifer cyrtiniformis
  - †Cyrtospirifer disjunctus
  - †Cyrtospirifer hornellensis
  - †Cyrtospirifer inermis
  - †Cyrtospirifer nucalis
  - †Cyrtospirifer preshoensis
  - †Cyrtospirifer sulcifer
  - †Cyrtospirifer vandermarkensis
  - †Cyrtospirifer whitneyi
- †Cyrtostropha – type locality for genus
  - †Cyrtostropha macrospira
- †Cyrtovaginoceras
- †Cystiphylloides
  - †Cystiphylloides americanum
  - †Cystiphylloides confollis
  - †Cystiphylloides conifolis
  - †Cystiphylloides conifollis
  - †Cystiphylloides sulcatum
- †Cystiphyllum
  - †Cystiphyllum niagarense
- †Cystophylloides
- †Cytarocrinus
- †Cyttarocrinus
  - †Cyttarocrinus eriensis

== D ==
- †Dactylogonia
  - †Dactylogonia incrassata
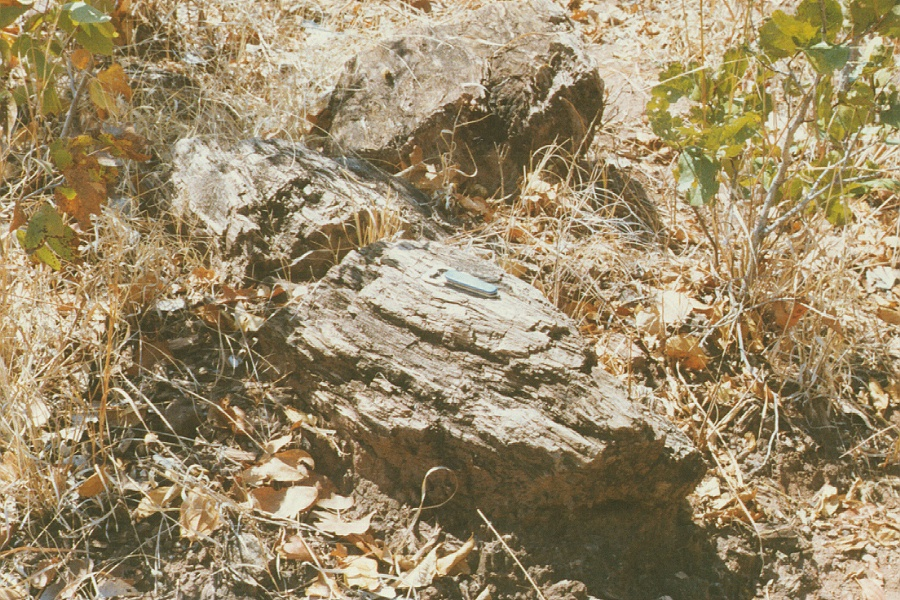
- Fossil of the Carboniferous-Late Cretaceous petrified conifer wood morphogenus Dadoxylon
  †Dadoxylon
  - †Dadoxylon halli – or unidentified comparable form
- †Dakeoceras
  - †Dakeoceras champlainense – type locality for species
  - †Dakeoceras gracilis
  - †Dakeoceras harrisi – type locality for species
- †Dalejina
  - †Dalejina hybrida
  - †Dalejina oblata – tentative report
- †Dalmanella
  - †Dalmanella elegantula
  - †Dalmanella elgantula
  - †Dalmanella rogata
  - †Dalmanella whittakeri
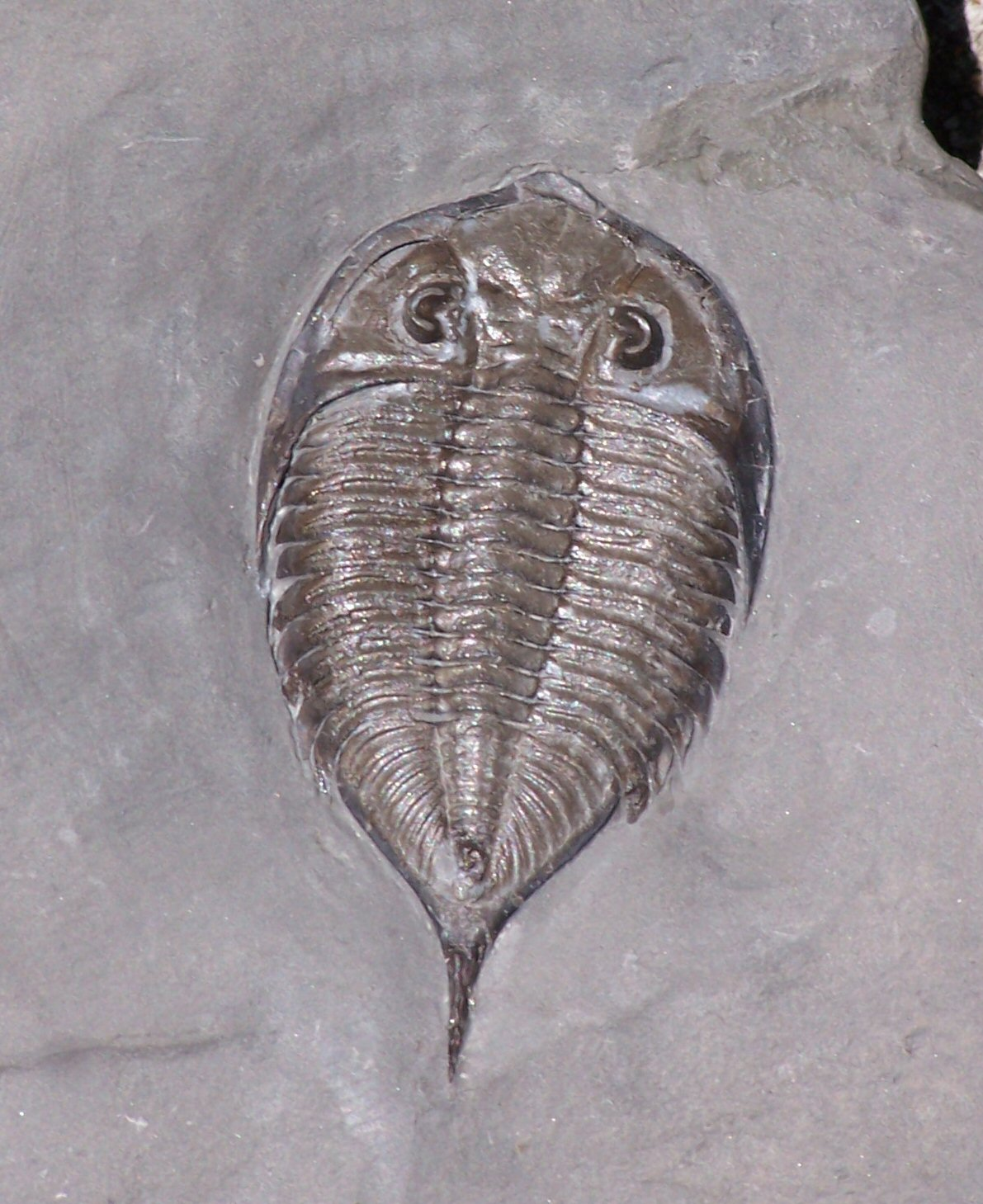
- Fossil of the Late Ordovician-Middle Devonian trilobite Dalmanites
  †Dalmanites
  - †Dalmanites limulurus
  - †Dalmanites litchfieldensis
- †Dalmanitina
- †Daonella
- †Dapsilodus
  - †Dapsilodus mutatus
- †Dawsonoceras
  - †Dawsonoceras americanum
  - †Dawsonoceras americanus
  - †Dawsonoceras annulatum
- †Decadocrinus
  - †Decadocrinus multinodosus
  - †Decadocrinus ornatus
- †Dechenella
  - †Dechenella macrocephalus
  - †Dechenella rowi
- †Decoriconus
  - †Decoriconus fragilis
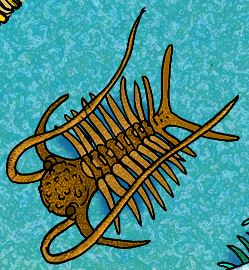
- Life restoration of two species of the Silurian trilobite Deiphon
  †Deiphon
- †Dekayia
- †Delphiceras
  - †Delphiceras cataphractum
- †Deltacrinus
  - †Deltacrinus clarus
  - †Deltacrinus contractus
- †Delthyris
- †Deltoceras
  - †Deltoceras vaningeri
- †Denayella
  - †Denayella rotalia
- †Dendrocrinus
  - †Dendrocrinus alternatus
  - †Dendrocrinus aphelos
  - †Dendrocrinus bactronodosus
  - †Dendrocrinus longidactylus
  - †Dendrocrinus ursae
- †Dendrocystites
  - †Dendrocystites paradoxocus
- †Densastroma
  - †Densastroma pexisum
- †Depasophyllum
  - †Depasophyllum tabulatum – type locality for species
- †Desmograptus
- †Devonacarus – type locality for genus
  - †Devonacarus sellnicki – type locality for species
- †Devonaster
- †Devonoblastus
  - †Devonoblastus leda
- †Devonochonetes
  - †Devonochonetes coronatus
  - †Devonochonetes scitulus
- †Diabolirhynchia
  - †Diabolirhynchia acinus – or unidentified comparable form
- †Diabolirhynchus
  - †Diabolirhynchus acinus
- †Diacanthaspis
  - †Diacanthaspis parvula
- †Diamesopora
  - †Diamesopora dichotoma
- †Diamesropora
  - †Diamesropora dichotoma
- †Diaphelasma
  - †Diaphelasma oklahomense – or unidentified comparable form
- †Diaphorastoma
- †Diaphorodus
  - †Diaphorodus delicatus
- †Dibolbina
- †Dibolisporites
  - †Dibolisporites correctus – or unidentified comparable form
- †Dicellograptus
- †Dicoelosia
  - †Dicoelosia biloba
- †Dicranella
  - †Dicranella bivertex
- †Dicranograptus
  - †Dicranograptus nicholsoni
- †Dicranopeltis
- †Dicranopltus
  - †Dicranopltus nereus – or unidentified comparable form
- †Dictyobembix
  - †Dictyobembix hebe – type locality for species
- †Dictyonema
  - †Dictyonema gracile
  - †Dictyonema gracilis
  - †Dictyonema hamiltoniae
  - †Dictyonema retiforme
  - †Dictyonema subretiforme
- †Dictyotomaria
  - †Dictyotomaria capillaria
  - †Dictyotomaria itylus – type locality for species
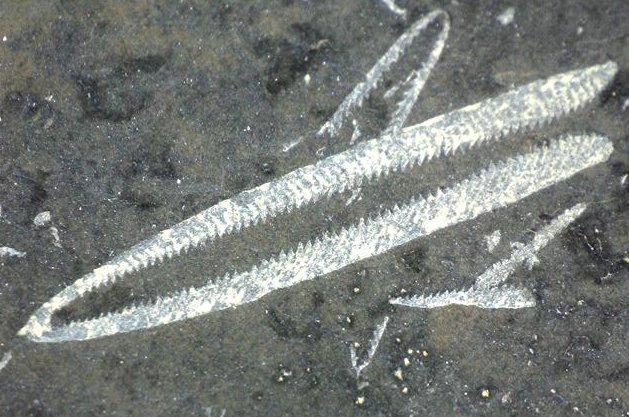
- Fossil of the Middle Ordovician graptolite Didymograptus
  †Didymograptus
- †Diestoceras
  - †Diestoceras sycon – type locality for species
- †Dignomia
  - †Dignomia alveata
- †Dikelocephalus
  - †Dikelocephalus hartti
  - †Dikelocephalus tribulus – type locality for species
- †Dimerocrinites
  - †Dimerocrinites arborescens
  - †Dimerocrinites lilliformis
  - †Dimerocrinites lockportensis
- †Dimerocrinus
  - †Dimerocrinus brachiatus
  - †Dimerocrinus liliiformis
- †Dimeropyge
  - †Dimeropyge clintonensis
- †Dinorthis
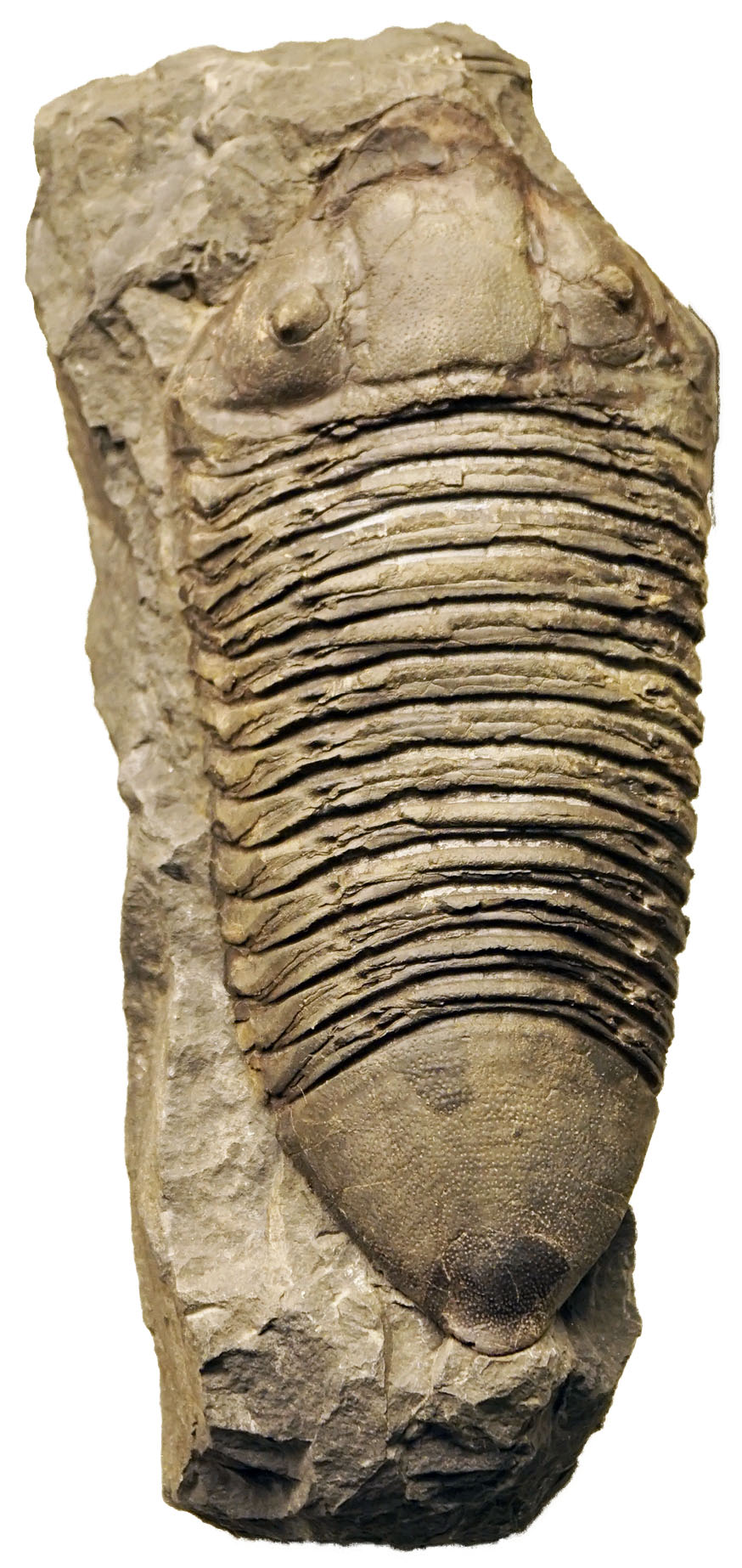
- Fossil of the Late Ordovician-Middle Devonian trilobite Dipleura
  †Dipleura
  - †Dipleura dekayi
- †Diploclema
  - †Diploclema sparsum
- †Diplograptus
- †Diplophyllum
  - †Diplophyllum subcaespitosum
- Discina
  - †Discina doria
  - †Discina minuta
- †Discinella
  - †Discinella micans
- †Discinocaris
- †Discomyorthis
  - †Discomyorthis musculosa
- †Discosorus
  - †Discosorus conoideus
- †Disphyllum
  - †Disphyllum caespitosum
- †Distacodus
  - †Distacodus falcatus
- †Distomodus
  - †Distomodus staurognathoides
- †Dizygopleura
  - †Dizygopleura intermedia
  - †Dizygopleura proutyi
- †Dizygopleurella
- †Dolatocrinus
  - †Dolatocrinus lirata
  - †Dolatocrinus liratus
  - †Dolatocrinus springeri – type locality for species
- †Doleroides
- †Dolerorthis
  - †Dolerorthis flabella
  - †Dolerorthis flabellites – or unidentified related form
- †Dolichoharpes
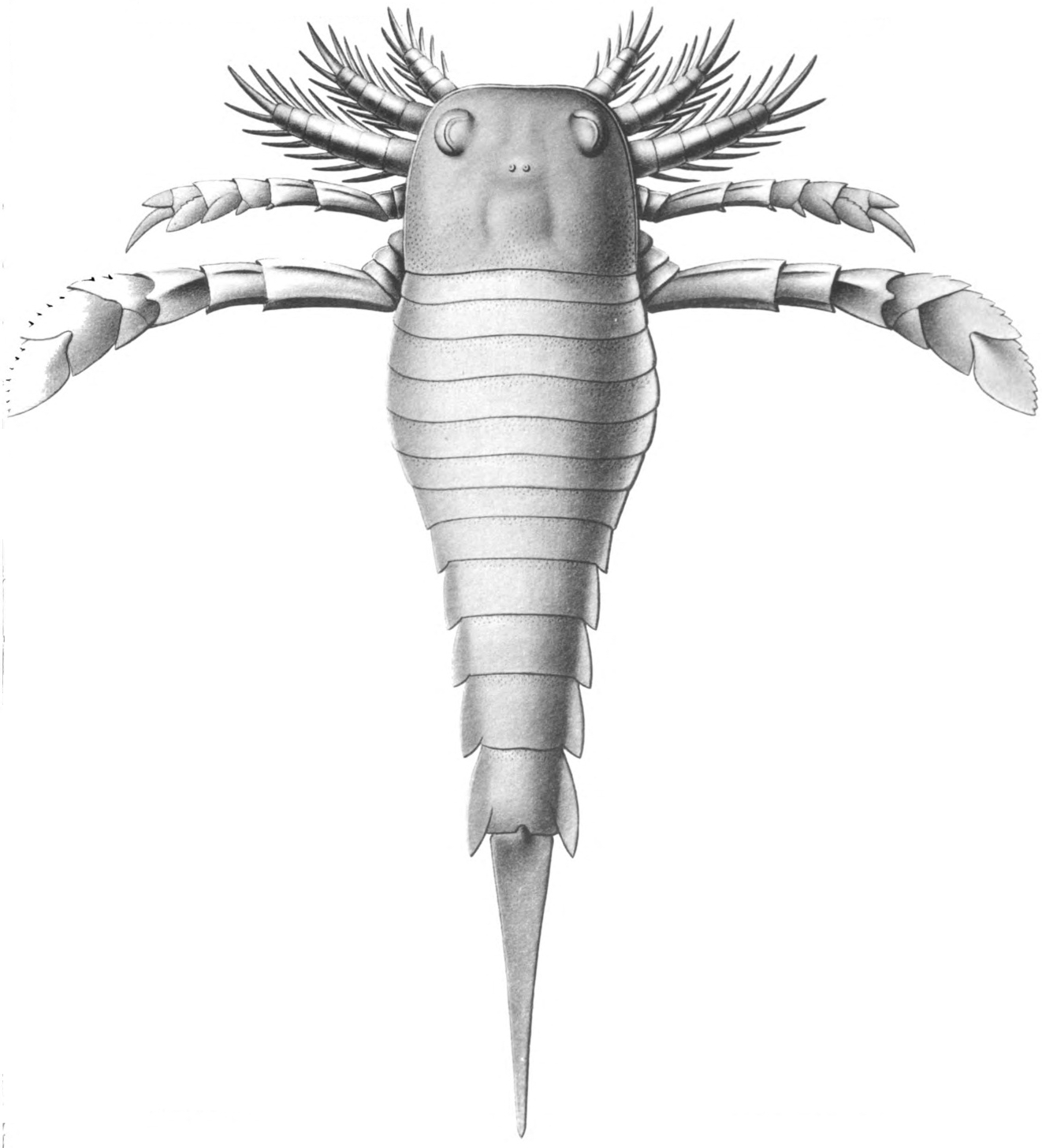
- Life restoration of the Silurian eurypterid ("sea scorpion") Dolichopterus
  †Dolichopterus
  - †Dolichopterus herkimerensis – type locality for species
  - †Dolichopterus jewetti – type locality for species
  - †Dolichopterus macocheirus
  - †Dolichopterus siluriceps
- †Doraclatum
  - †Doraclatum compandium – type locality for species
- †Douvillina
  - †Douvillina cayuta
  - †Douvillina inaequistriata
  - †Douvillina inequistriata
  - †Douvillina ineuistriata
  - †Douvillina inquistriata
- †Dracochela – type locality for genus
  - †Dracochela deprehendor – type locality for species
- †Drepanellina
  - †Drepanellina modesta
- †Drepanoistodus
  - †Drepanoistodus concavus
  - †Drepanoistodus suberectus
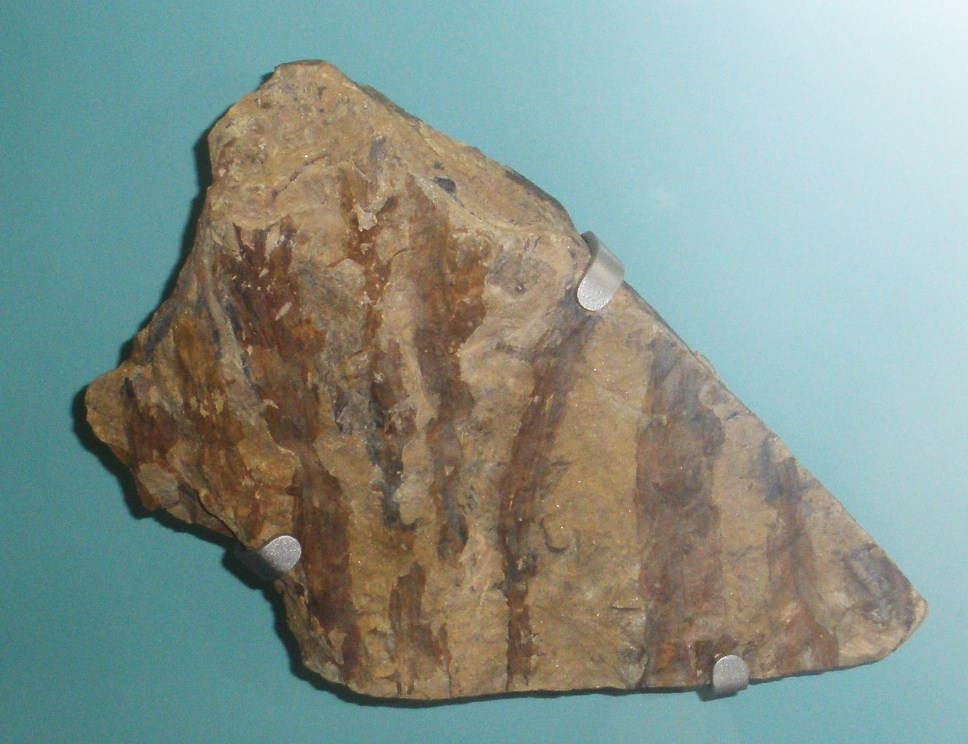
- Fossilized foliage from the Early-Late Devonian club moss relative Drepanophycus
  †Drepanophycus
  - †Drepanophycus colophyllus
  - †Drepanophycus gaspianus
  - †Drepanophycus spinaeformis
  - †Drepanophycus spinosus
- †Drydenia
  - †Drydenia foliata
- †Dwightoceras
  - †Dwightoceras dactyloides
- †Dynamocrinus
  - †Dynamocrinus robustus
- †Dyoidophragma
  - †Dyoidophragma polymorphum

== E ==
- †Eatonia
  - †Eatonia medalis
  - †Eatonia medialis
- †Ecchosis – type locality for genus
  - †Ecchosis pulchribothrium – type locality for species
- †Ecculiomphalus
  - †Ecculiomphalus fredericus
- †Eccyliopterus
  - †Eccyliopterus kalmi
  - †Eccyliopterus vagrans
- †Ecdyceras
  - †Ecdyceras sinuiferum
- †Echinocaris
- †Echinocoelia
  - †Echinocoelia ambocoelioides
  - †Echinocoelia ambocoeloides
- †Echinolichas
  - †Echinolichas eriopus
- †Ectenoceras
- †Ectenocrinus
  - †Ectenocrinus simplex
  - †Ectenocrinus triangulus
- †Ectenodesma
- †Ectenolites
  - †Ectenolites clelandi
  - †Ectenolites curviseptatus
  - †Ectenolites extensus
  - †Ectenolites sinuatus
- †Ectocycloceras
  - †Ectocycloceras cataline
  - †Ectocycloceras cato
- †Edaphophyllum
- †Eddya
  - †Eddya sullivanensis
- †Edmondia (bivalve) – tentative report
  - †Edmondia philipi
- †Edriocrinus
  - †Edriocrinus occidentalis
  - †Edriocrinus pociliformis
- †Elasmonema
  - †Elasmonema lichas
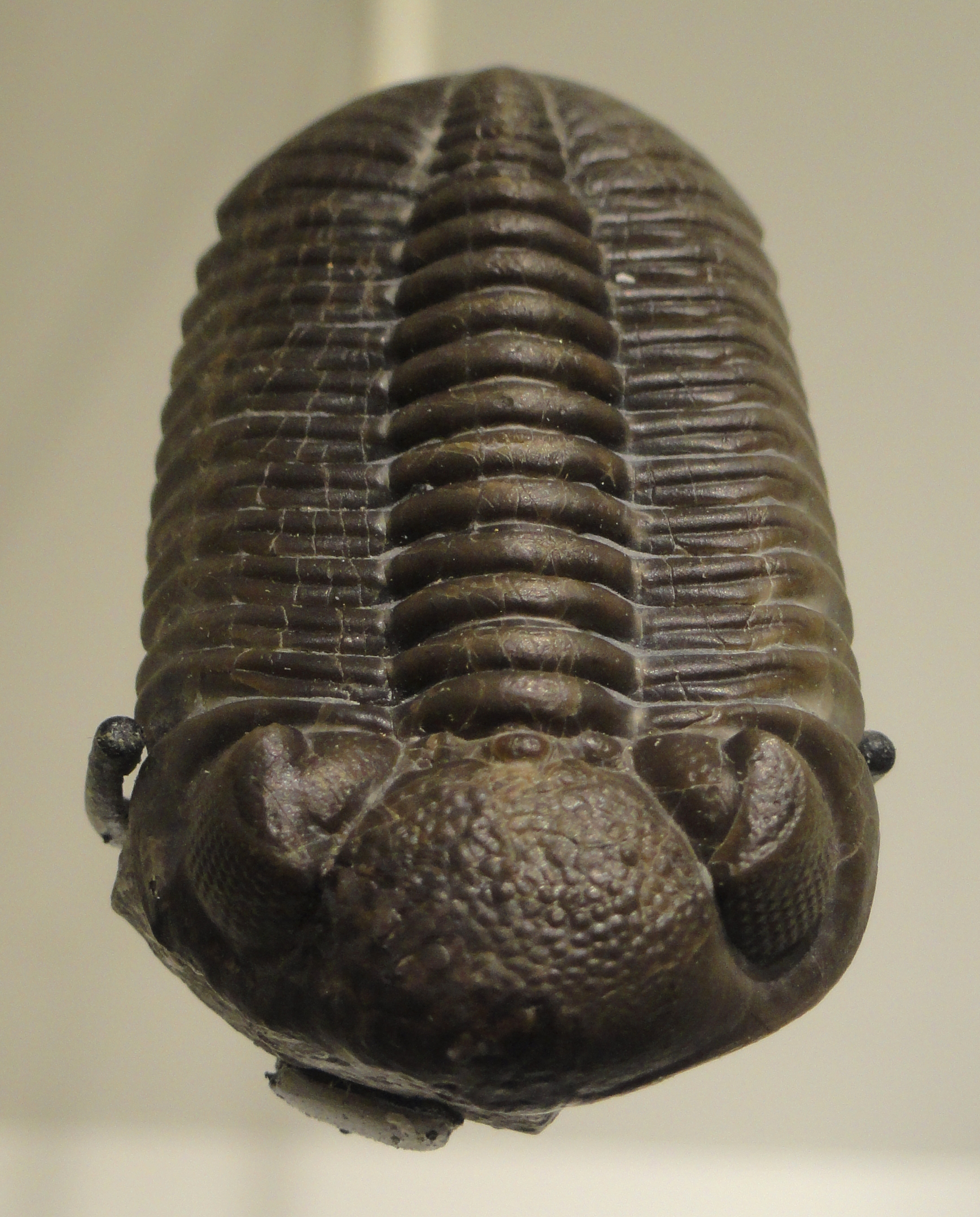
- Fossil of the Middle-Late Devonian trilobite Eldredgeops
  †Eldredgeops
  - †Eldredgeops rana
- †Eleutherocrinus
- †Elita
  - †Elita fimbriata
  - †Elita fimoriata
- †Ellesmeroceras
  - †Ellesmeroceras inbricatum
  - †Ellesmeroceras indomitum
- †Elliptocephala
  - †Elliptocephala asaphoides
- †Elyta
  - †Elyta fimbriata
- †Emanuella
  - †Emanuella subumbona
- †Emmanuella
  - †Emmanuella subumbona
- †Emmelezoe
- †Emmelozoe
- †Emmonsia
- †Emphanisporites – tentative report
- †Enallophrentis – tentative report
- †Encrinaster
- †Encrinurus
  - †Encrinurus ornatus
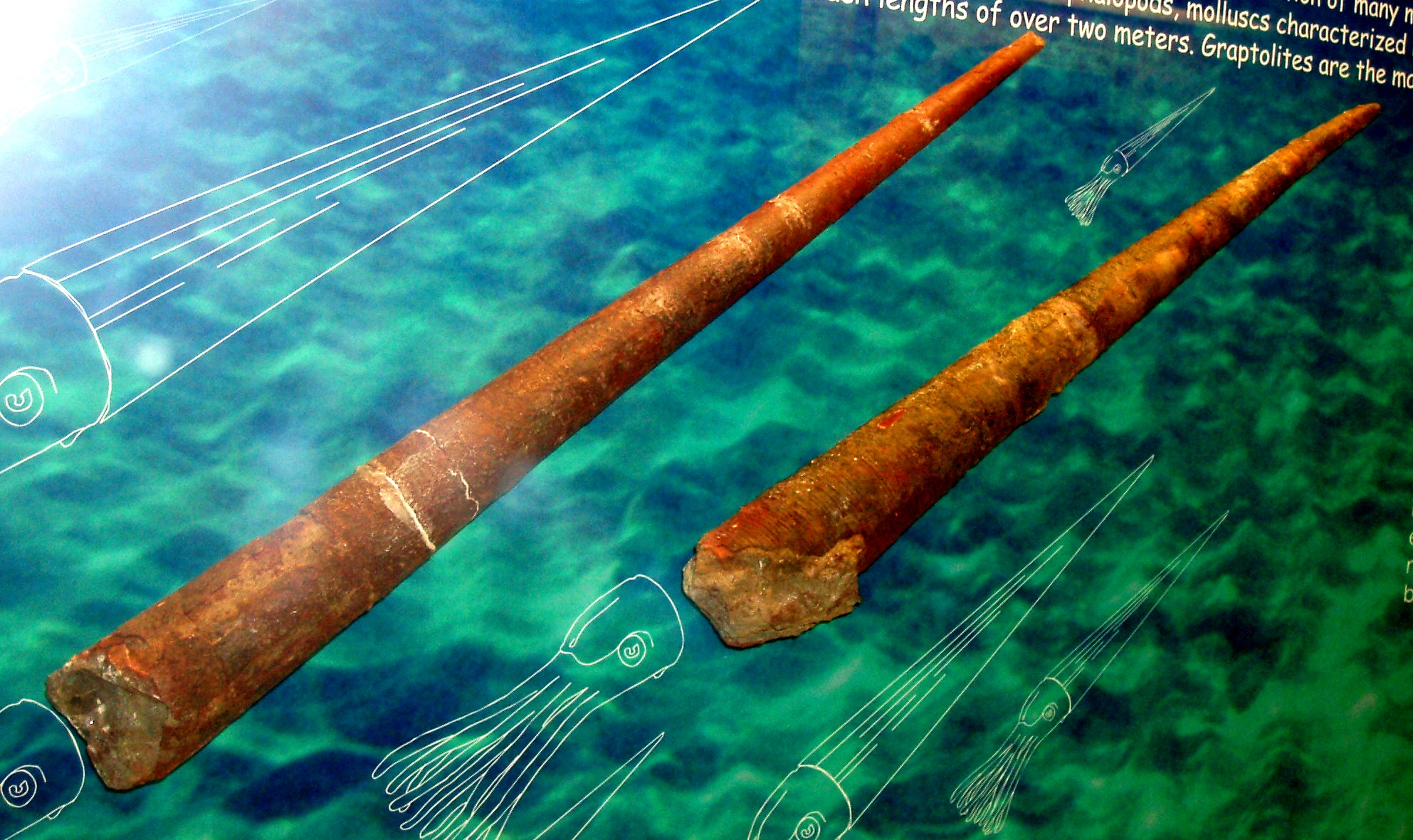
- Fossilized shells and restored appearances of the Middle-Late Ordovician nautiloid cephalopod Endoceras
  †Endoceras
  - †Endoceras annuliferum
  - †Endoceras champlainense
  - †Endoceras hudsoni
  - †Endoceras magister
  - †Endoceras proteiforme
  - †Endoceras raymondi
  - †Endoceras tityrus
- †Endodesma
  - †Endodesma tranceps
- †Endophyllum
  - †Endophyllum ciurcai – type locality for species
- †Enfieldia
  - †Enfieldia mutilata
- †Ensiferites
  - †Ensiferites armatus
  - †Ensiferites bennetti
  - †Ensiferites delicatulus
  - †Ensiferites leptodactylus
  - †Ensiferites wattlesi
- †Enterolasma
  - †Enterolasma calculum
  - †Enterolasma caliculum
  - †Enterolasma strictum
- †Eoagnostus
  - †Eoagnostus acrorhachis – type locality for species
- †Eoangyomphalus
  - †Eoangyomphalus peneglabra – type locality for species
- †Eoarthropleura – type locality for genus
- †Eobucania
  - †Eobucania subovatus – type locality for species
- †Eocoelia
  - †Eocoelia hemisphaerica
  - †Eocoelia hemispherica
  - †Eocoelia intermedia
  - †Eocoelia sulcata
- †Eodevonaria
  - †Eodevonaria acutiradiata
  - †Eodevonaria arcuata
  - †Eodevonaria gaspensis – or unidentified comparable form
  - †Eodevonaria hemispherica
- †Eodictyonella (formerly Dictyonella)
  - †Eodictyonella coralifera
- †Eohalysiocrinus
  - †Eohalysiocrinus caelatus
  - †Eohalysiocrinus typus
- †Eoleperditia
- †Eomyelodactylus
  - †Eomyelodactylus sparteus – type locality for species
  - †Eomyelodactylus spartus
  - †Eomyelodactylus uniformis – type locality for species
- †Eoplectodonta
  - †Eoplectodonta transversalis
- †Eopolychaetus
- †Eorizoceras
  - †Eorizoceras platyceroides
- †Eorudolfoceras
  - †Eorudolfoceras antiquum
- †Eoschizodus
  - †Eoschizodus chemungensis
- †Eoschuchertella
  - †Eoschuchertella arcotostriata
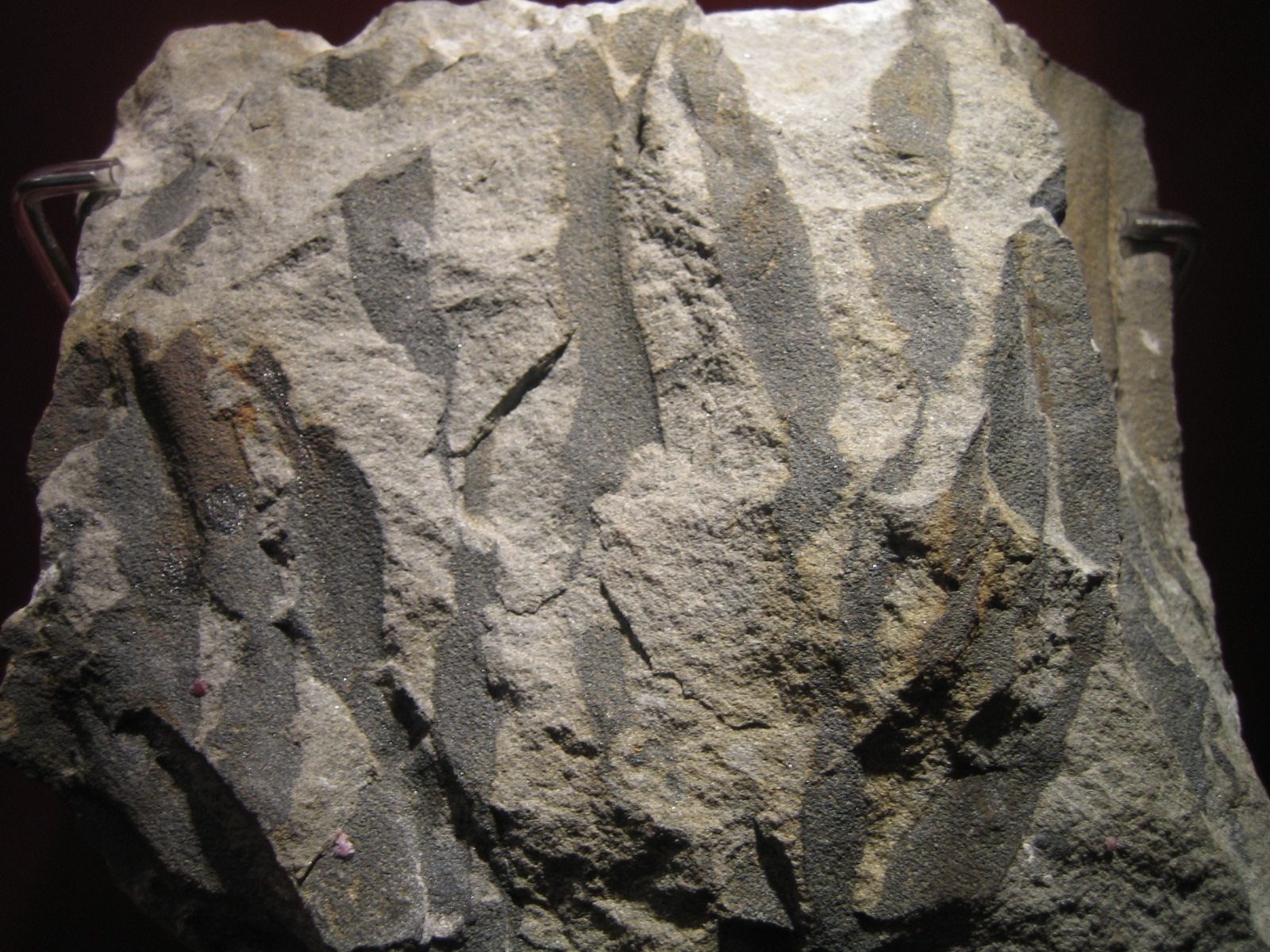
- Fossilized roots of the Middle Devonian tree Wattieza
  †Eospermatopteris
  - †Eospermatopteris erianus – tentative report
- †Eospinatrypa
  - †Eospinatrypa nodostriata
- †Eospirifer
  - †Eospirifer plicatula – or unidentified comparable form
  - †Eospirifer radiatus
- †Eospongia
  - †Eospongia varians
- †Eosyringothyris – or unidentified comparable form
  - †Eosyringothyris asper
- †Eotripteroceras
  - †Eotripteroceras minutum
- †Epitornoceras
  - †Epitornoceras mithracoides – or unidentified comparable form
  - †Epitornoceras peracutum
- †Erdiotrypa
  - †Erdiotrypa striata
- †Eremoceras
  - †Eremoceras expansum
  - †Eremoceras multicameratum
  - †Eremoceras teres
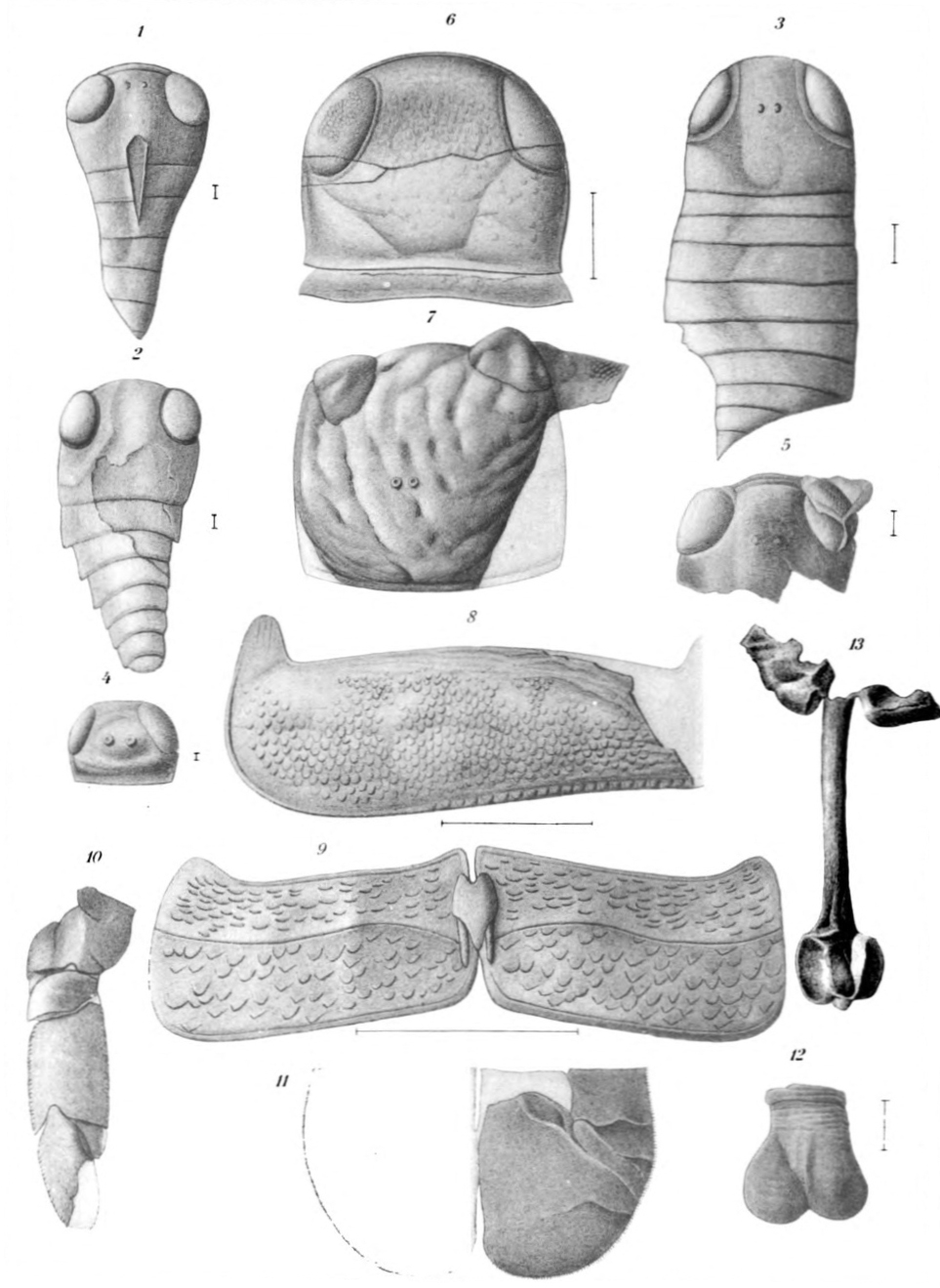
- Illustration of fossils of various organs and stages of development of the Silurian-Early Devonian eurypterid ("sea scorpion") Erettopterus
  †Erettopterus
  - †Erettopterus globiceps
  - †Erettopterus grandis
  - †Erettopterus waylandsmithi – type locality for species
- †Eridophyllum
  - †Eridophyllum gigas
  - †Eridophyllum subcaespitosum
- †Eridotrypa
  - †Eridotrypa exigua
  - †Eridotrypa mutabilis
  - †Eridotrypa nutabilis
  - †Eridotrypa solida
  - †Eridotrypa striata
- †Eridotrypella
  - †Eridotrypella striata – or unidentified comparable form
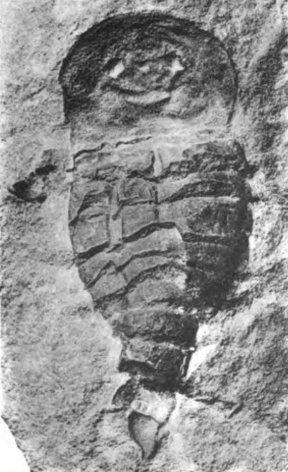
- Fossils (figures 2-10) of the Silurian-Devonian eurypterid ("sea scorpion") Erieopterus
  †Erieopterus
  - †Erieopterus microphthalmus
- †Eroicaspira
  - †Eroicaspira bellicincta
- †Erratencrinurus
  - †Erratencrinurus vigilans
- †Escharopora
- †Etymothyris
- †Eucalyptocrinites
  - †Eucalyptocrinites caelatus
- †Eucalyptocrinus
  - †Eucalyptocrinus caelatus
- †Eucheirocrinus
- †Euconia
  - †Euconia sinuata – type locality for species
- †Euglyphella
  - †Euglyphella asapha – type locality for species
  - †Euglyphella deltella – type locality for species
  - †Euglyphella numismoides
- †Eukloedenella
- †Eumetabolotoechia
  - †Eumetabolotoechia multicostata
- †Eunema
- †Eunoa
- †Euomphalus
  - †Euomphalus clymenoides
  - †Euomphalus fairchildi – type locality for species
- †Euptychaspis
  - †Euptychaspis typicalis
- †Eurychilina
  - †Eurychilina canadensis
  - †Eurychilina latimarginata
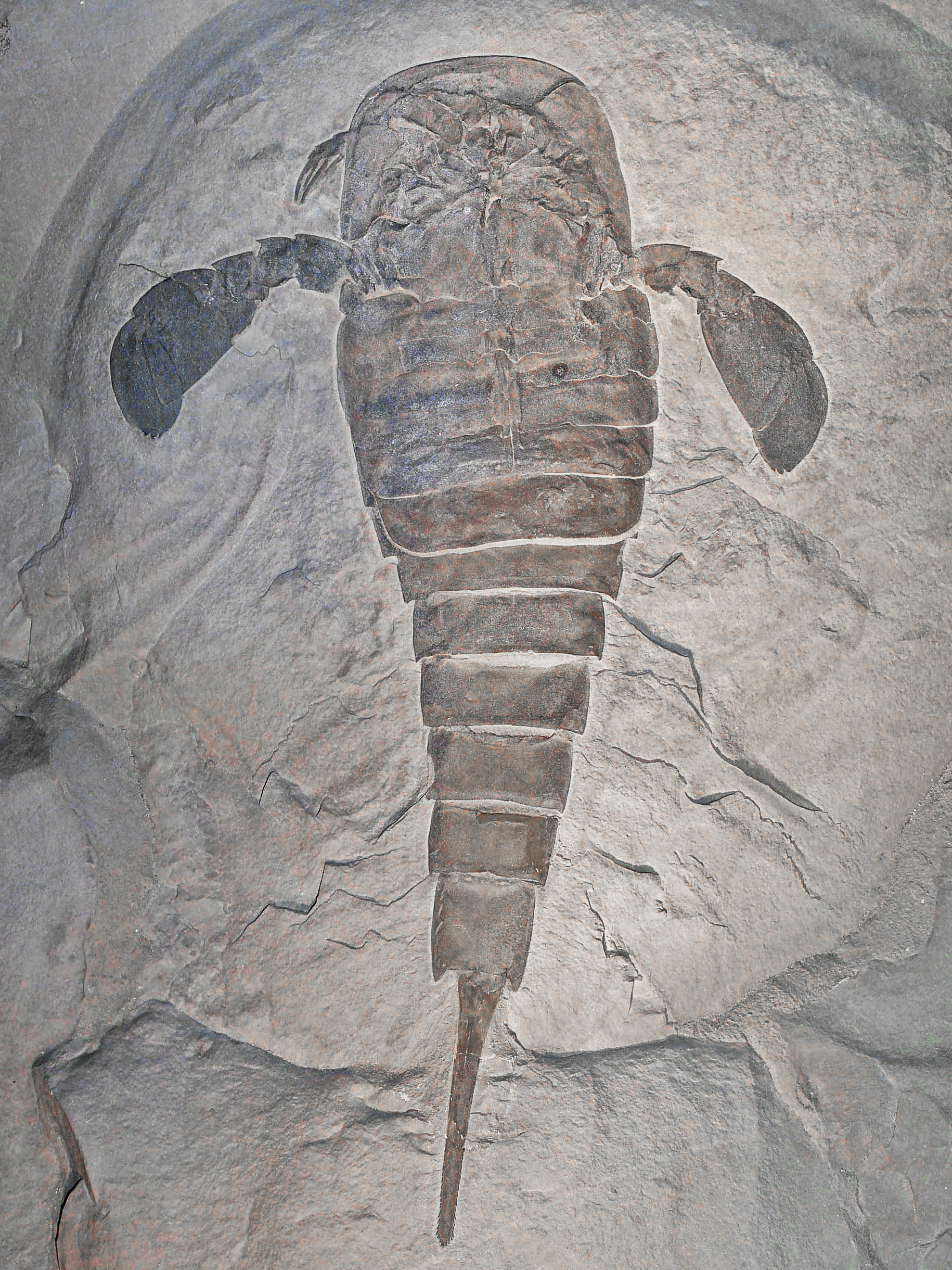
- Fossil of the Silurian eurypterid ("sea scorpion") Eurypterus
  †Eurypterus
  - †Eurypterus dekayi
  - †Eurypterus laculatus
  - †Eurypterus pittsfordensis
  - †Eurypterus remipes
- †Eurystomites
  - †Eurystomites accelerans
  - †Eurystomites amplectens
  - †Eurystomites kelloggi
- †Euryzone
  - †Euryzone arata
  - †Euryzone clausa
  - †Euryzone itys
- †Eusarcus
- †Euspirocrinus
  - †Euspirocrinus wolcottense
- †Eutaxocrinus
  - †Eutaxocrinus ithacense
  - †Eutaxocrinus whiteavesi
- †Exoclitendoceras – type locality for genus
  - †Exoclitendoceras rochdalense – type locality for species

== F ==
- †Fahraeusodus
  - †Fahraeusodus marathonensis
- †Failleana
  - †Failleana limbata
- †Falsipollex
  - †Falsipollex simplilobatus – type locality for species
- †Fardenia
  - †Fardenia interstriata
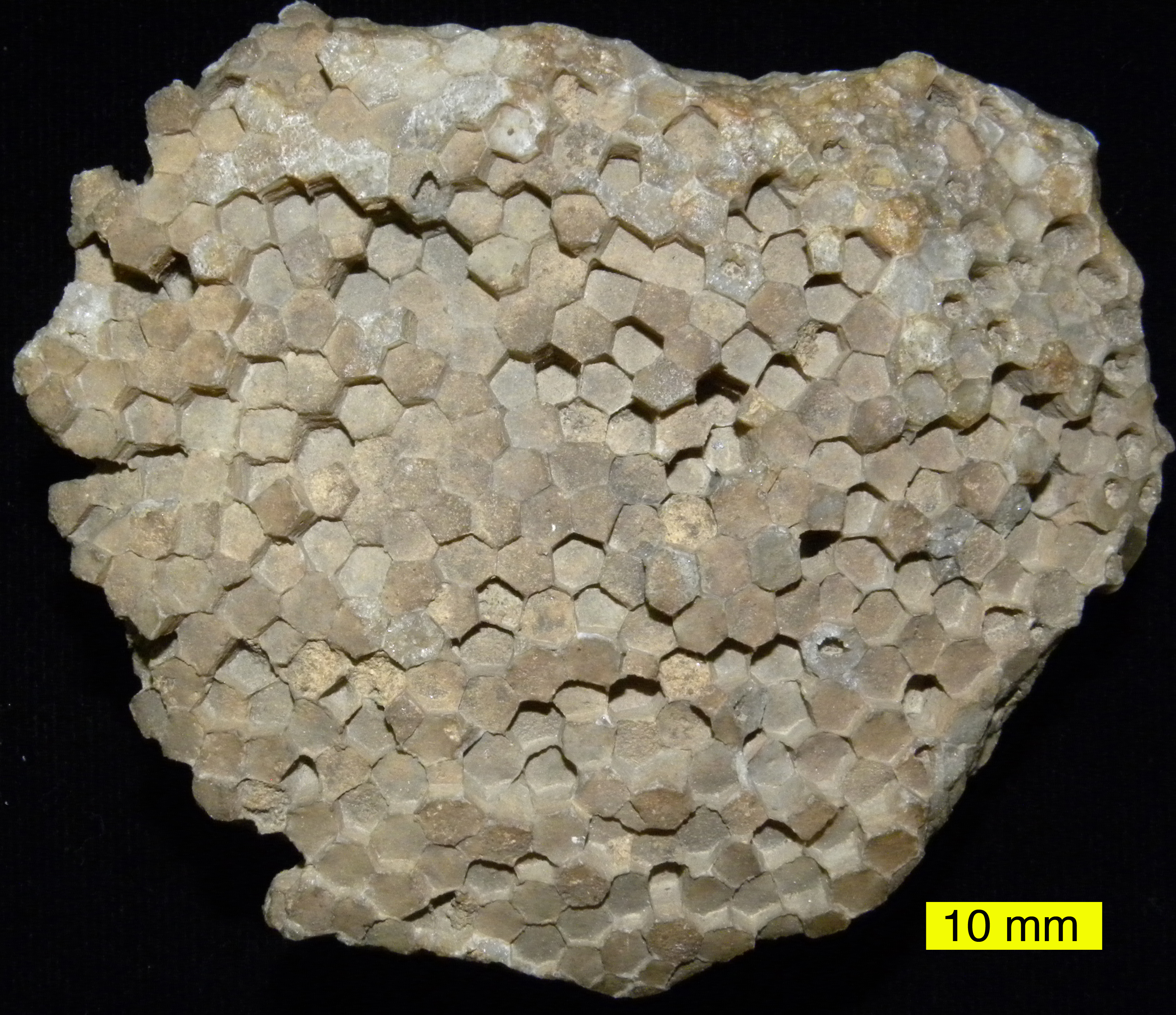
- Fossil of the Late Ordovician-Permian tabulate coral Favosites
  †Favosites
  - †Favosites alpenensis
  - †Favosites arbuscula
  - †Favosites argus
  - †Favosites basalticus
  - †Favosites biloculi
  - †Favosites canadensis
  - †Favosites constrictus
  - †Favosites emmonsi
  - †Favosites epidermatus
  - †Favosites favosideus
  - †Favosites hamiltoniae
  - †Favosites helderbergensis
  - †Favosites helderbergiae
  - †Favosites hisingeri
  - †Favosites limitaris
  - †Favosites milne-edswardii
  - †Favosites milneedwardsii
  - †Favosites niagarensis
  - †Favosites nitella – tentative report
  - †Favosites parasiticus
  - †Favosites placenta
  - †Favosites pyriforme
  - †Favosites pyriformis
  - †Favosites tuberosa
  - †Favosites turbinata
  - †Favosites turbinatus
- †Fenestella
  - †Fenestella elegans
  - †Fenestella emaciata
  - †Fenestella eumaciata
  - †Fenestella planiramosa
  - †Fenestella tenuis
- †Fenestrellina
- †Ferestromatopora – report made of unidentified related form or using admittedly obsolete nomenclature
- †Filogranites
  - †Filogranites booiji
- †Fimbrispirifer
  - †Fimbrispirifer divaricata
  - †Fimbrispirifer divaricatus
- †Finkelnburgia
- †Fistulipora
  - †Fistulipora crustula
  - †Fistulipora laminata
  - †Fistulipora sphericus
  - †Fistulipora tuberculosa
- †Fistulopora
  - †Fistulopora tuberculosa
- †Flabellitesia
  - †Flabellitesia flabellites
- †Fletcheria
  - †Fletcheria incerta
  - †Fletcheria incognita
- †Fletcherina
  - †Fletcherina incognita
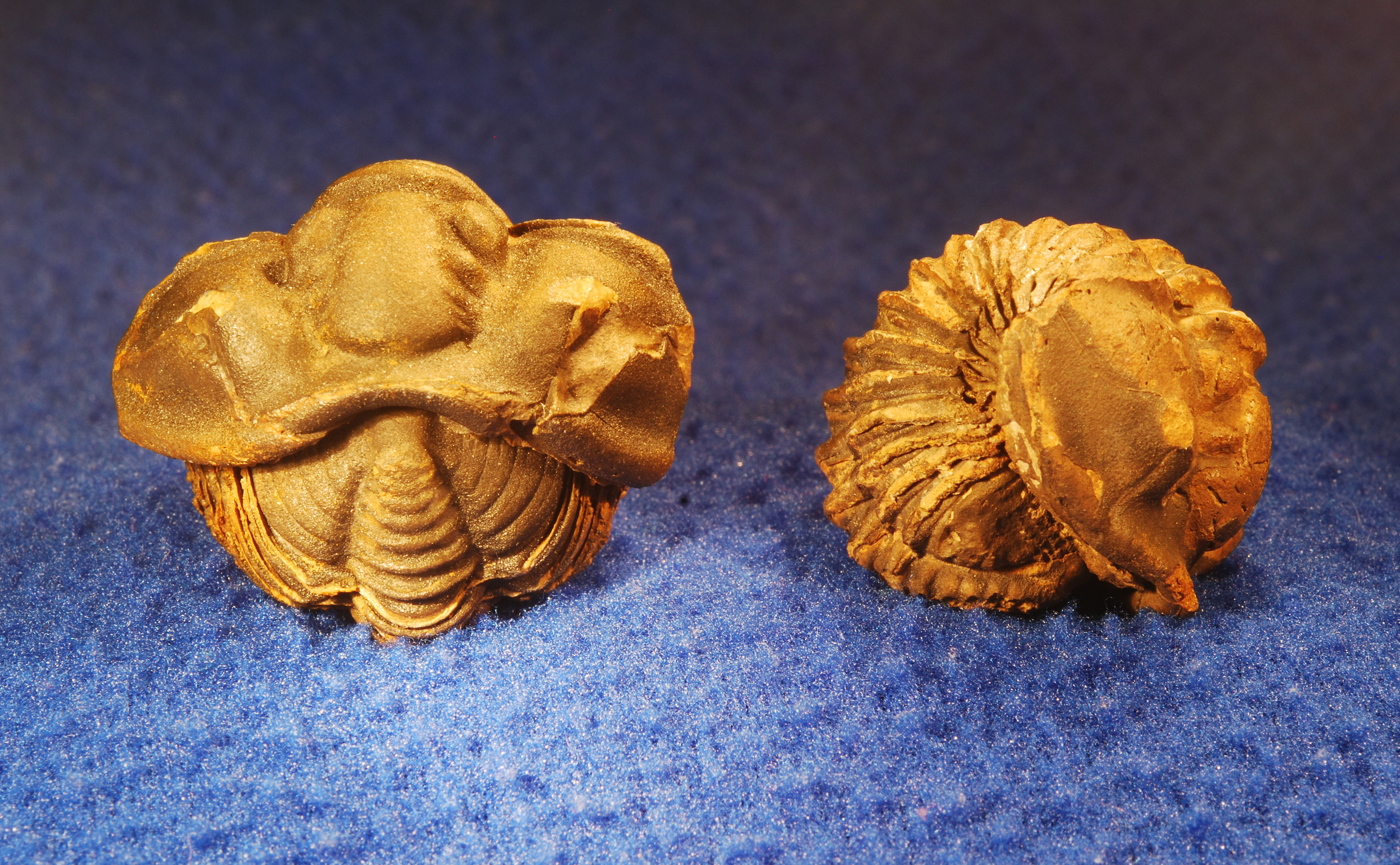
- Front (left) and right side (right) views of an enrolled fossil of the Middle Ordovician-Silurian trilobite Flexicalymene
  †Flexicalymene
  - †Flexicalymene senaria
- †Floripatella
  - †Floripatella irregularis
- †Floweria
  - †Floweria arctostriata
  - †Floweria becraftensis
  - †Floweria chemungensis
  - †Floweria perversa
- †Foersteoceras
- †Foerstephyllum
  - †Foerstephyllum halli
- †Foliaster
  - †Foliaster transversus
- †Foordites
  - †Foordites buttsi – or unidentified comparable form
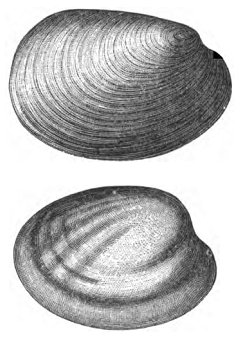
- Illustrations of fossilized shells of the Cambrian marine bivalve Fordilla
  †Fordilla
- †Fremontoceras
  - †Fremontoceras jewetti
- †Fusispira

== G ==
- †Garwoodia
  - †Garwoodia gregaria
- †Gasconadia
  - †Gasconadia floridensis – type locality for species
  - †Gasconadia mohawkensis – type locality for species
- †Gazacrinus
  - †Gazacrinus immaturus
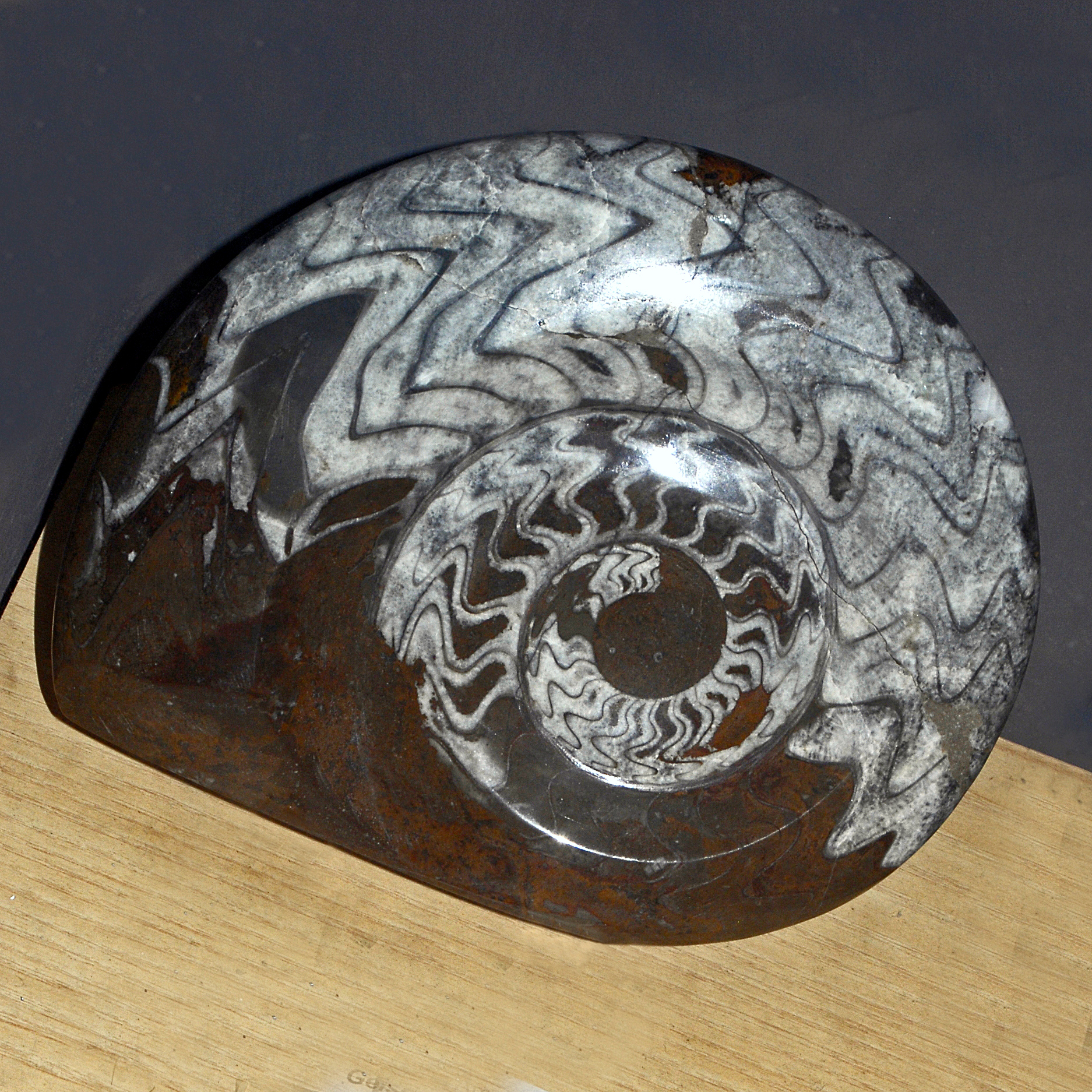
- Fossilized shell of the Middle Ordovician-Middle Devonian nautiloid cephalopod Geisonoceras
  †Geisonoceras
  - †Geisonoceras lineolatus
  - †Geisonoceras shumardi
  - †Geisonoceras tenuistriatum
  - †Geisonoceras tenuitextum
- †Gelasinotarbus – type locality for genus
  - †Gelasinotarbus bifidus – type locality for species
  - †Gelasinotarbus bonamoae – type locality for species
  - †Gelasinotarbus fimbriunguis – type locality for species
  - †Gelasinotarbus heptops – type locality for species
  - †Gelasinotarbus reticulatus – type locality for species
- †Gennaeocrinus
  - †Gennaeocrinus eucharis
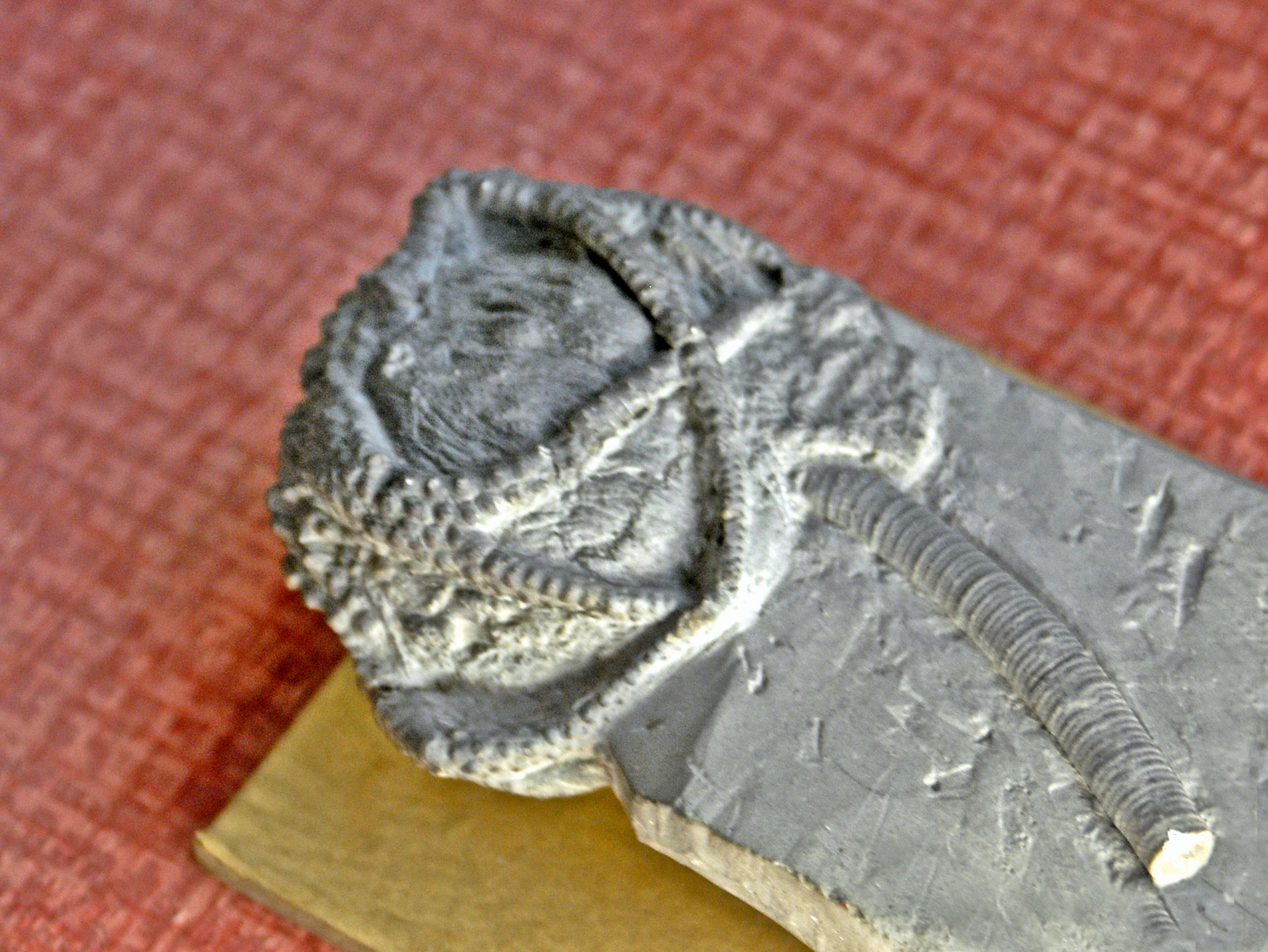
- Fossilized calyx and partial stem of the Devonian-Carboniferous crinoid ("sea lily") Gilbertsocrinus
  †Gilbertsocrinus
  - †Gilbertsocrinus alpenensis
  - †Gilbertsocrinus intersculptus – type locality for species
  - †Gilbertsocrinus rarispinus – type locality for species
  - †Gilbertsocrinus spinigerous
  - †Gilbertsocrinus spinigerus
- †Gilboaphyton
  - †Gilboaphyton goldringiae
- †Gilboarachne
  - †Gilboarachne griersoni – type locality for species
- †Ginkgophyton
- †Glaphurina
  - †Glaphurina lamottensis
- †Glaphurus
  - †Glaphurus pustulatus
  - †Glaphurus pustulotus
- †Glenisteroceras
  - †Glenisteroceras obscurum
- †Glossites
  - †Glossites depressus
  - †Glossites nuculoides
- †Glossograptus
- †Glyptocardia
  - †Glyptocardia speciosa
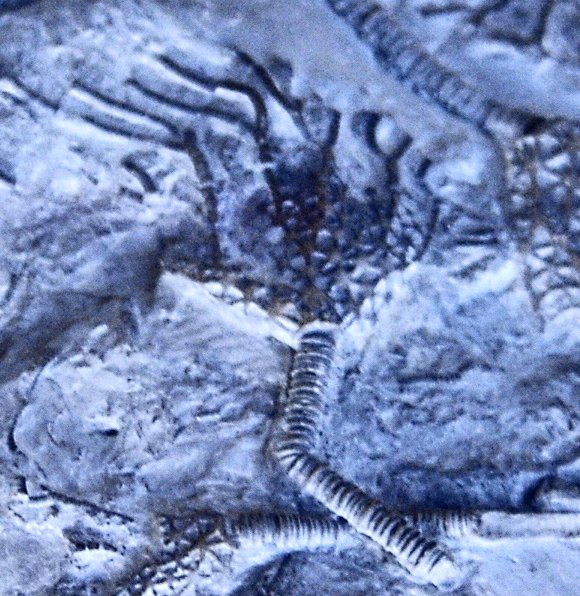
- Assemblage of fossils of the Middle Ordovician-Silurian crinoid ("sea lily") Glyptocrinus
  †Glyptocrinus
- †Glyptocystites
  - †Glyptocystites forbesi
- †Glyptodesma
- †Glyptograptus
- †Glyptomena
  - †Glyptomena distans
  - †Glyptomena prisca
- †Glyptorthis
  - †Glyptorthis bellarugosa
  - †Glyptorthis crispata
  - †Glyptorthis sulcata
- †Glyptotomaria
  - †Glyptotomaria ciliata – type locality for species
  - †Glyptotomaria genundewa – type locality for species
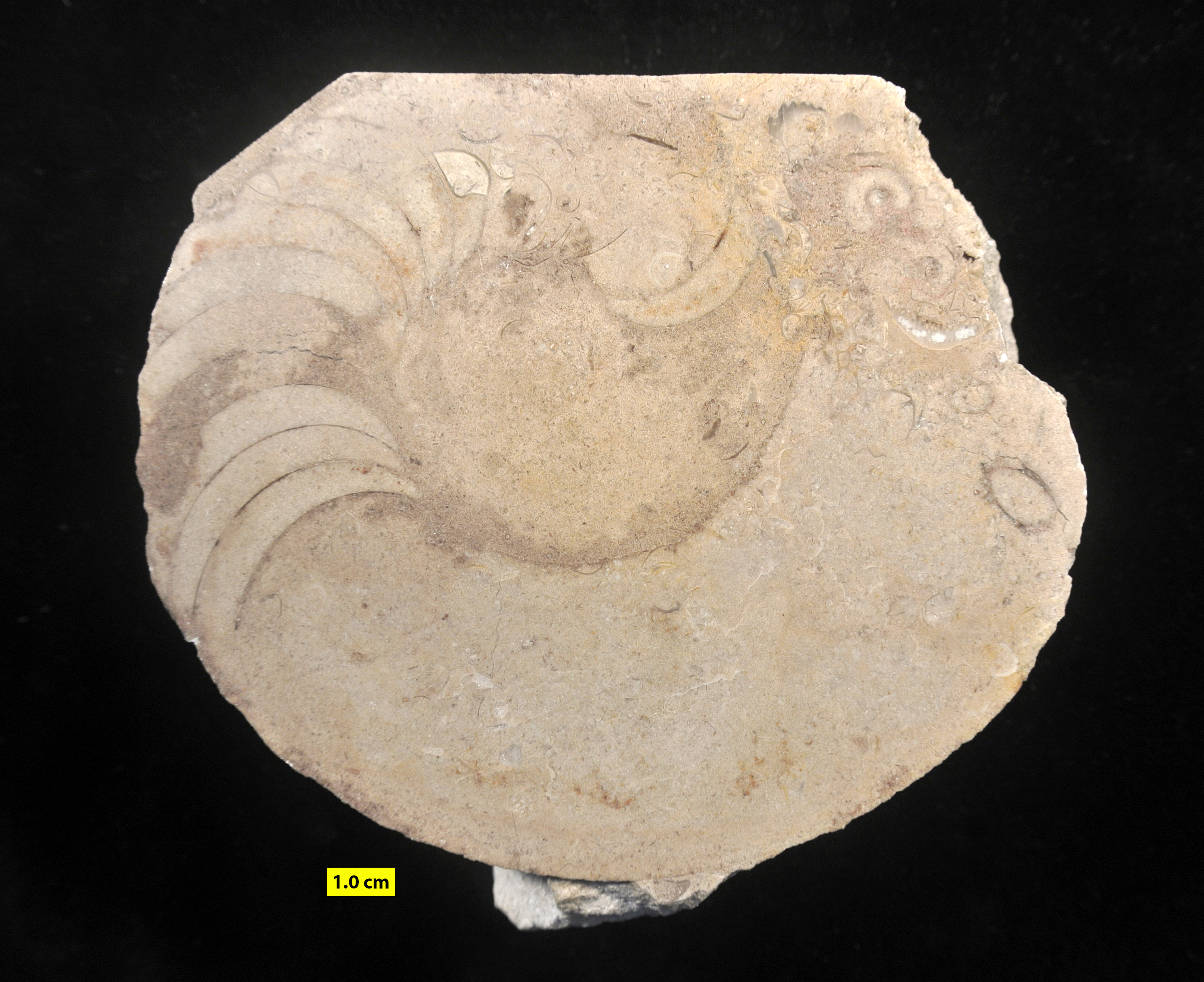
- Fossilized shell of the Middle Devonian nautiloid cephalopod Goldringia
  †Goldringia
  - †Goldringia trivolvis
- †Gomphoceras
- †Gomphocysstites
  - †Gomphocysstites tenax – or unidentified comparable form
- †Gonatocaris
- †Gondekia
  - †Gondekia lancifer
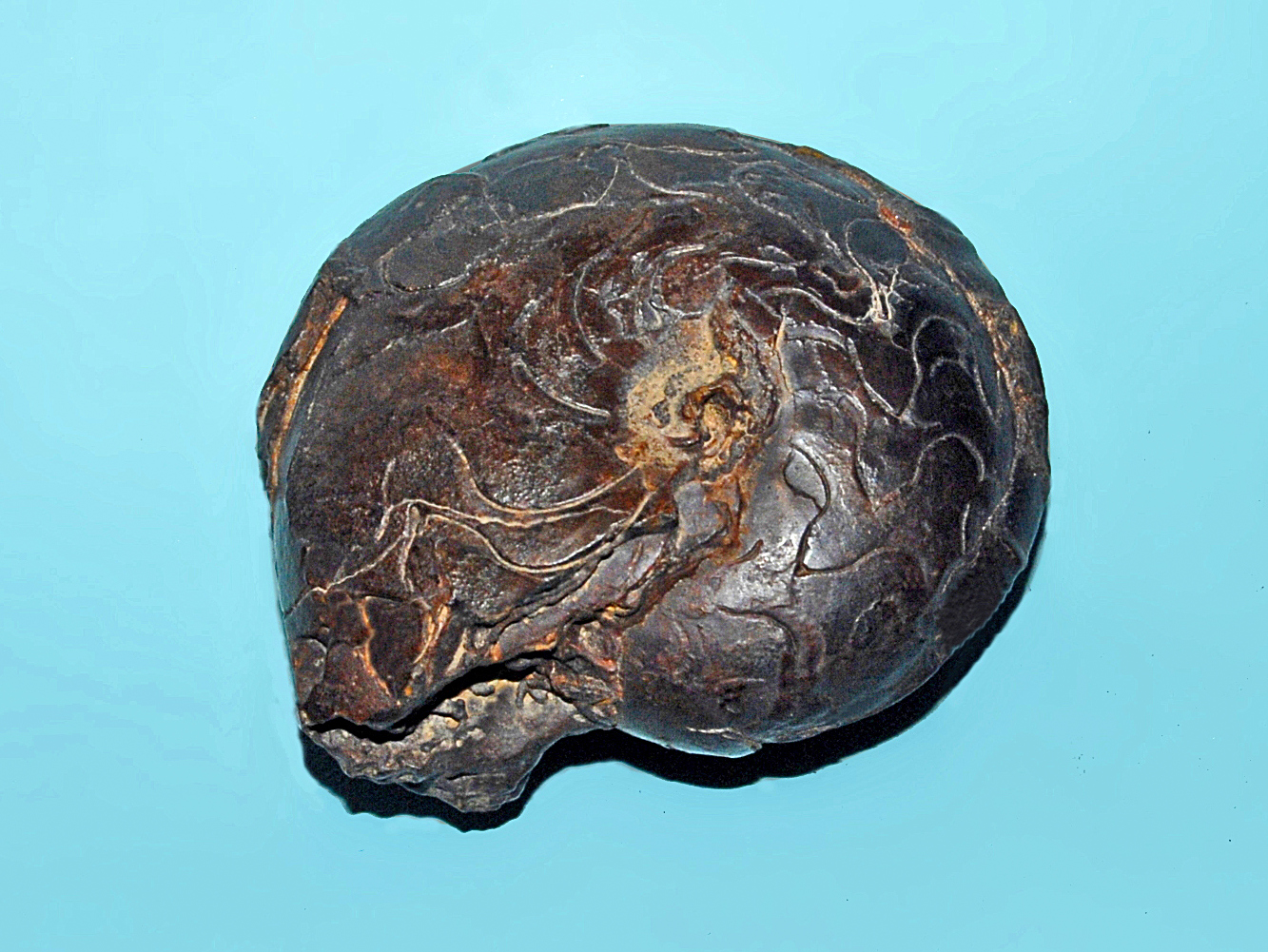
- Fossilized shell of the Late Devonian-Late Triassic ammonoid cephalopod Goniatites
  †Goniatites
- †Gonioceras
  - †Gonioceras anceps
  - †Gonioceras brainerdi
  - †Gonioceras chaziense
  - †Gonioceras multiseptatum
  - †Gonioceras pameliense
  - †Gonioceras quadratum
- †Goniograptus
- †Goniophora
  - †Goniophora chemungensis
  - †Goniophora hamiltonensis
  - †Goniophora hamiltoniae
  - †Goniophora rugosa
  - †Goniophora truncata
- †Goniophoria
  - †Goniophoria chemungensis
- †Goniostropha
  - †Goniostropha extenuata
- †Gosseletia
  - †Gosseletia triquetra
- †Gothocrinus – tentative report
  - †Gothocrinus multibrachiatus
- †Graciloceras
  - †Graciloceras longidomum
- †Gramatodon
  - †Gramatodon chemungensis
  - †Gramatodon hamiltoniae
- †Grammatodon
  - †Grammatodon hamiltoniae
- †Grammysia
  - †Grammysia alveata
  - †Grammysia arcuata
  - †Grammysia bisulcata
  - †Grammysia elliptica
  - †Grammysia nodocosta
  - †Grammysia obsoleta
  - †Grammysia praecursor
- †Grammysioidea
  - †Grammysioidea alveata
  - †Grammysioidea arcuata
  - †Grammysioidea constricta
  - †Grammysioidea elliptica – or unidentified comparable form
  - †Grammysioidea globosa
  - †Grammysioidea obsoleta
  - †Grammysioidea subarcuata
- †Grammysoidea
  - †Grammysoidea arcuata
  - †Grammysoidea bisulcata
  - †Grammysoidea constricta
- †Graptodictya
- †Graptospongia
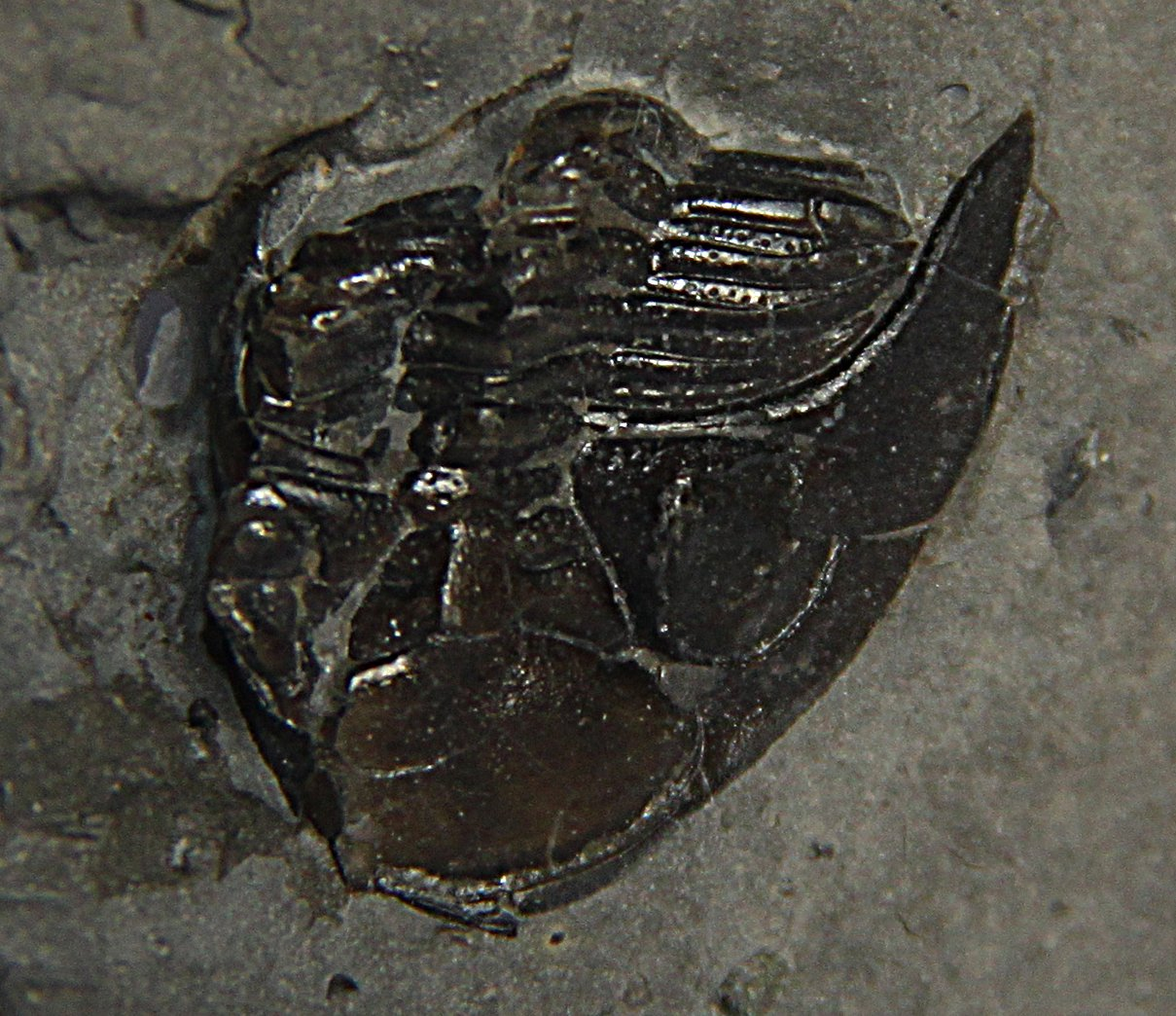
- Fossil of the Middle-Late Devonian trilobite Greenops
  †Greenops
  - †Greenops boothi
- †Grinnellaspis
  - †Grinnellaspis marginiata – or unidentified comparable form
- †Groomodiscus
  - †Groomodiscus calcifer – type locality for species
- †Gypidula
  - †Gypidula coeymanensis
- †Gyroceras
  - †Gyroceras paucinodum

== H ==
- †Habrostroma
  - †Habrostroma centrotum
  - †Habrostroma controtum
  - †Habrostroma microporum
- †Hadrophyllum
  - †Hadrophyllum woodi
- †Hagnocrinus
  - †Hagnocrinus corporiculus
- †Haileyia
- †Halkieria
- †Hallinetes
  - †Hallinetes lineatus
  - †Hallinetes setigera
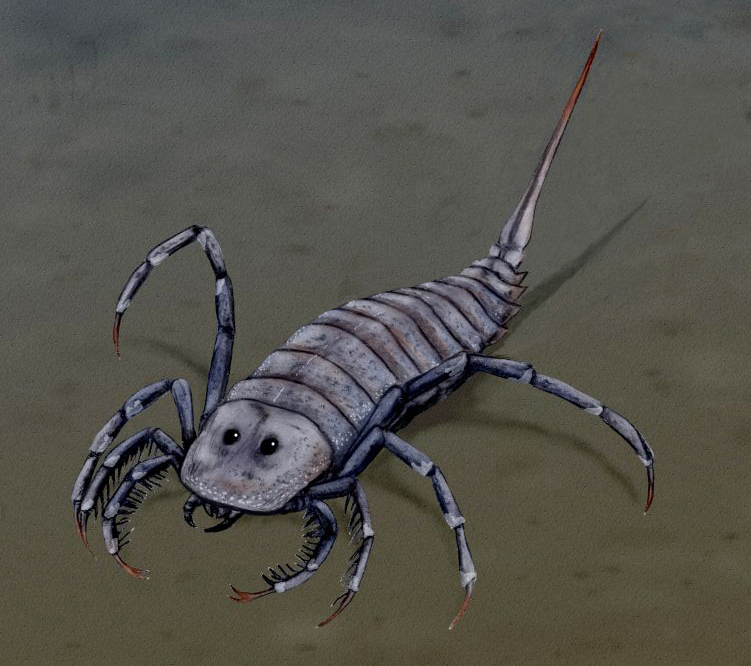
- Life restoration of the Late Devonian eurypterid ("sea scorpion") Hallipterus
  †Hallipterus
  - †Hallipterus excelsior
- †Halloceras
  - †Halloceras undulatum
- †Hallograptus
- †Hallopora
  - †Hallopora elegantula
- †Halysites
  - †Halysites catenularia
- †Hanaites
  - †Hanaites platus
- †Hapsiphyllum
  - †Hapsiphyllum bifurcatum
- †Haptocrinus
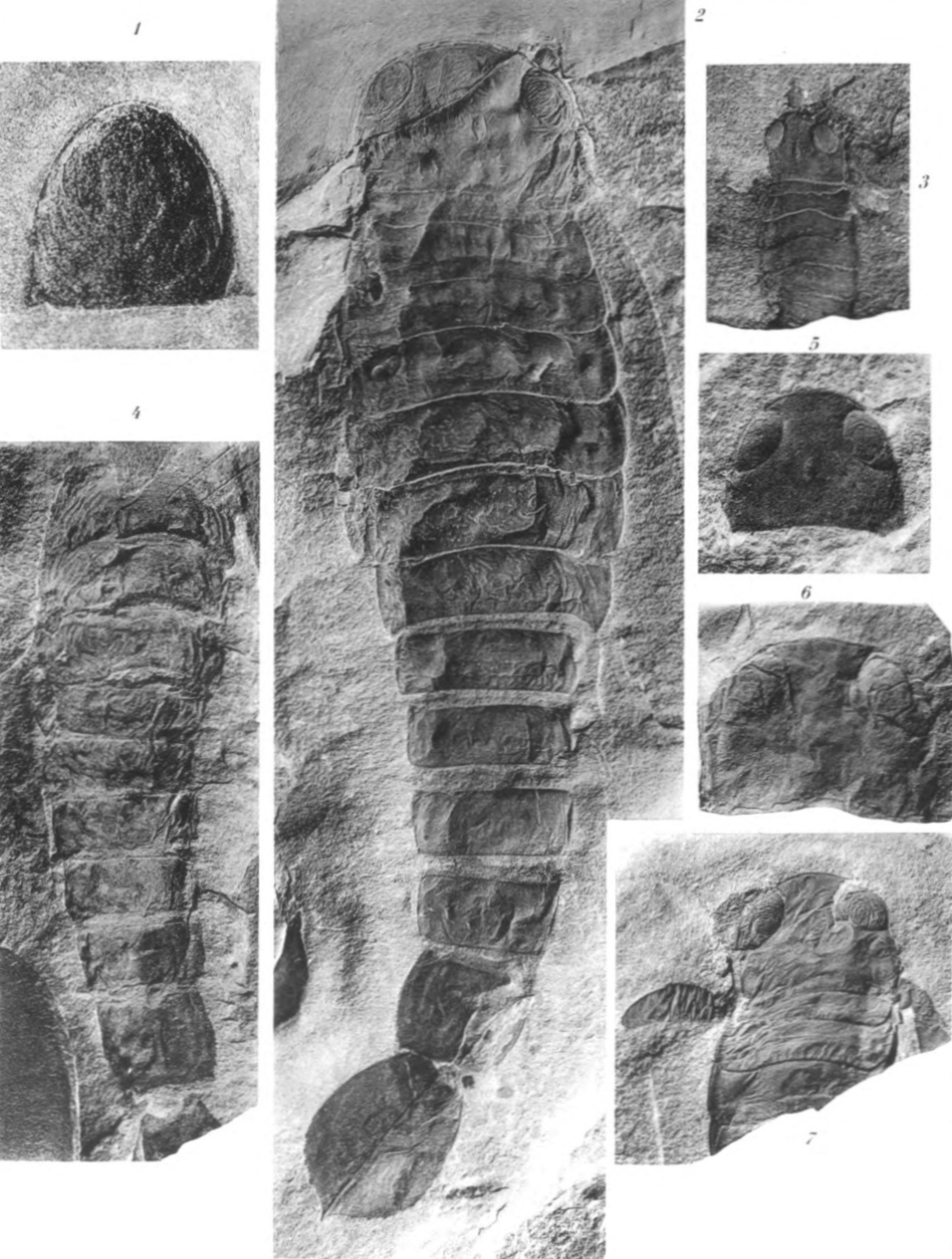
- Fossil of the Silurian eurypterid ("sea scorpion") Hardieopterus
  †Hardieopterus
  - †Hardieopterus myops
- †Haskinsia
  - †Haskinsia colophylla
- †Healdia
  - †Healdia arkonensis – or unidentified comparable form
- †Hebetoceras
  - †Hebetoceras cylindriforme
  - †Hebetoceras mirandum
- †Hedeina
  - †Hedeina eudora
  - †Hedeina macropleura
- †Hedellara
- †Hederella
- †Helcionella
  - †Helcionella subrugosa
- †Heliolites
  - †Heliolites elegans
  - †Heliolites pyriformis
  - †Heliolites spinipora – tentative report
- †Heliomeroides
  - †Heliomeroides teres
- †Heliophylloides
  - †Heliophylloides corniculum
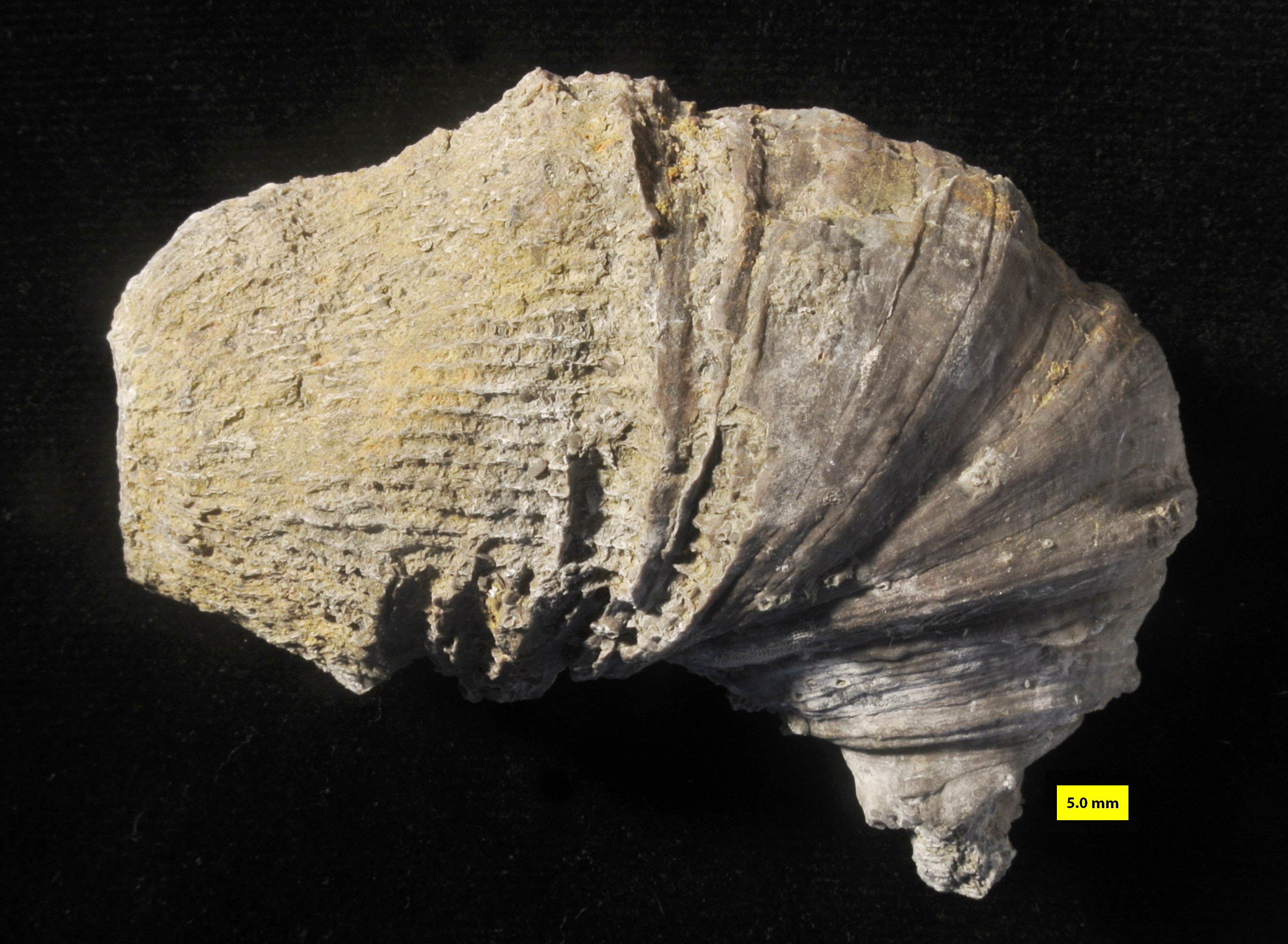
- Fossil of the Middle Devonian horn coral Heliophyllum
  †Heliophyllum
  - †Heliophyllum confluens
  - †Heliophyllum gemmatum
  - †Heliophyllum halli
- †Helopora
  - †Helopora fragilis
  - †Helopora ragilis
- †Hemiarges
  - †Hemiarges turneri
- †Hemiaspis
- †Hemicystites
  - †Hemicystites parasiticus
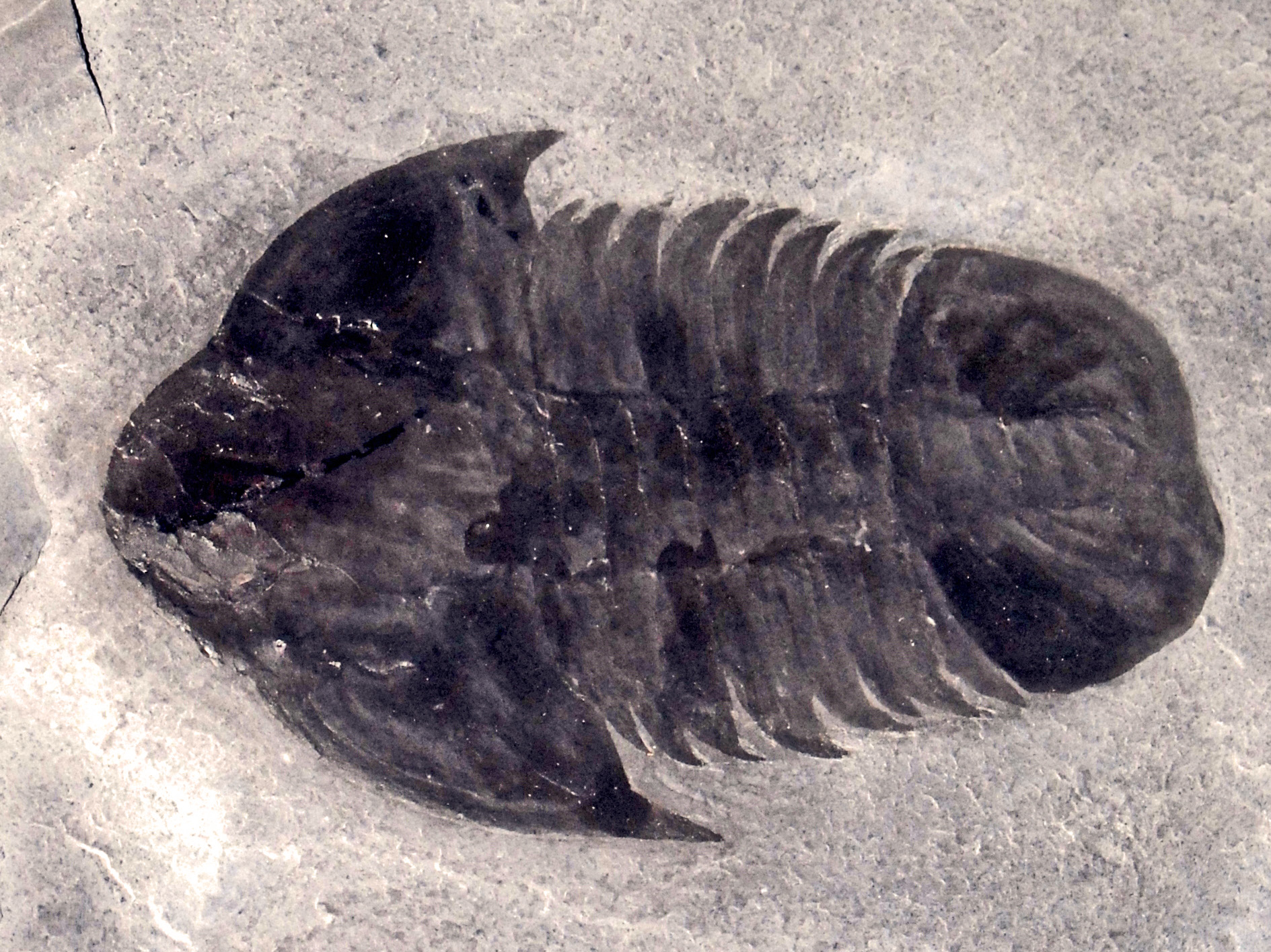
- Fossil of the Cambrian trilobite Hemirhodon
  †Hemirhodon
- †Hennigopora
- †Hepaticites
  - †Hepaticites devonicus
- †Hercostrophia
  - †Hercostrophia subcamerata
- †Hercynella
  - †Hercynella buffaloensis – or unidentified comparable form
- †Hernodia
- †Herrmannina
  - †Herrmannina alta
- †Hertzina
  - †Hertzina elongata
- †Hesperorthis
  - †Hesperorthis costalis
  - †Hesperorthis ignicula
- †Heterocrinus
  - †Heterocrinus heterodactylus
- †Heterophrentis
  - †Heterophrentis complanata
  - †Heterophrentis prolifica
  - †Heterophrentis simplex
- †Heteroschisma
  - †Heteroschisma canadensis
- †Hexameroceras
  - †Hexameroceras chadwicki – tentative report
- †Hibbardia
  - †Hibbardia lacrimosa
- †Hibbertia
  - †Hibbertia valcourensis
- †Hindella
- †Hindia
- †Hipparionix
- †Hipparionyx
  - †Hipparionyx proximus – or unidentified comparable form
- †Hoareicardia
  - †Hoareicardia cunea
- †Hollinella
  - †Hollinella ampulla – type locality for species
  - †Hollinella epakra – type locality for species
  - †Hollinella plauta
  - †Hollinella retusilobata – type locality for species
  - †Hollinella sella – type locality for species
  - †Hollinella tricollina
- †Holocystites – tentative report
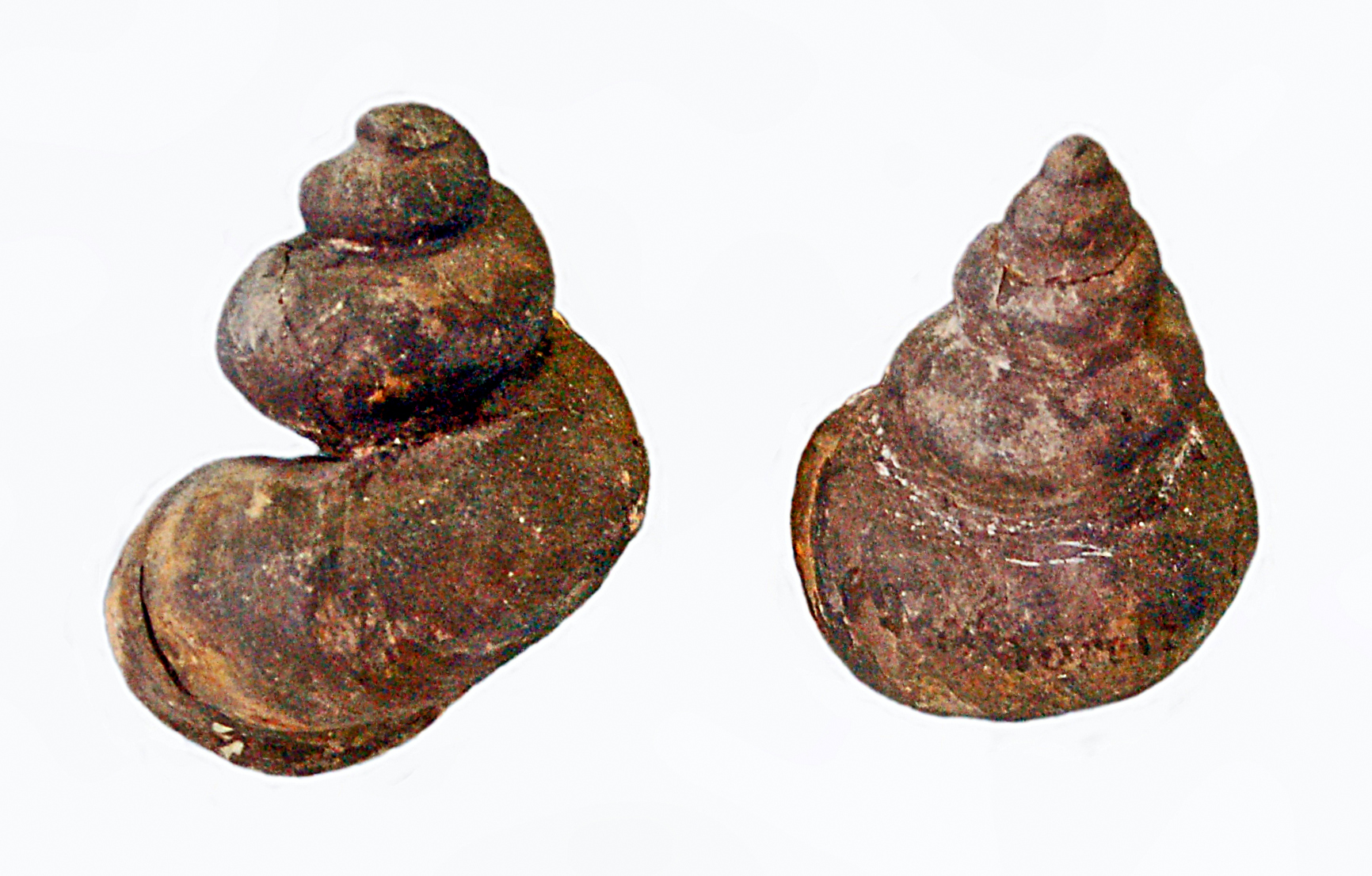
- Fossilized shells of the Ordovician-Carboniferous sea snail Holopea
  †Holopea
  - †Holopea obsoleta
  - †Holopea plauta
  - †Holopea plautus
  - †Holopea scrutator
- †Homalonotus
  - †Homalonotus delphinocephalus
  - †Homalonotus dlephinocephalus
- †Homalophyllum
  - †Homalophyllum exigum
- †Homeospira
  - †Homeospira apriniformis
- †Homocrinus
  - †Homocrinus parvus
- †Homocystites
  - †Homocystites anatiformis
- †Homoeospira
  - †Homoeospira apriniformis
- †Homotrypa
  - †Homotrypa similis
- †Hormotoma
  - †Hormotoma bilineata – type locality for species
  - †Hormotoma gracilis
  - †Hormotoma micula
  - †Hormotoma simplex
  - †Hormotoma sulcatum
- †Hostinella
  - †Hostinella silurica
- †Howellella
  - †Howellella crispa
  - †Howellella cycloptera – or unidentified comparable form
  - †Howellella cyclopterus
  - †Howellella vanuxemi
- †Hudsonoceras
  - †Hudsonoceras aristos
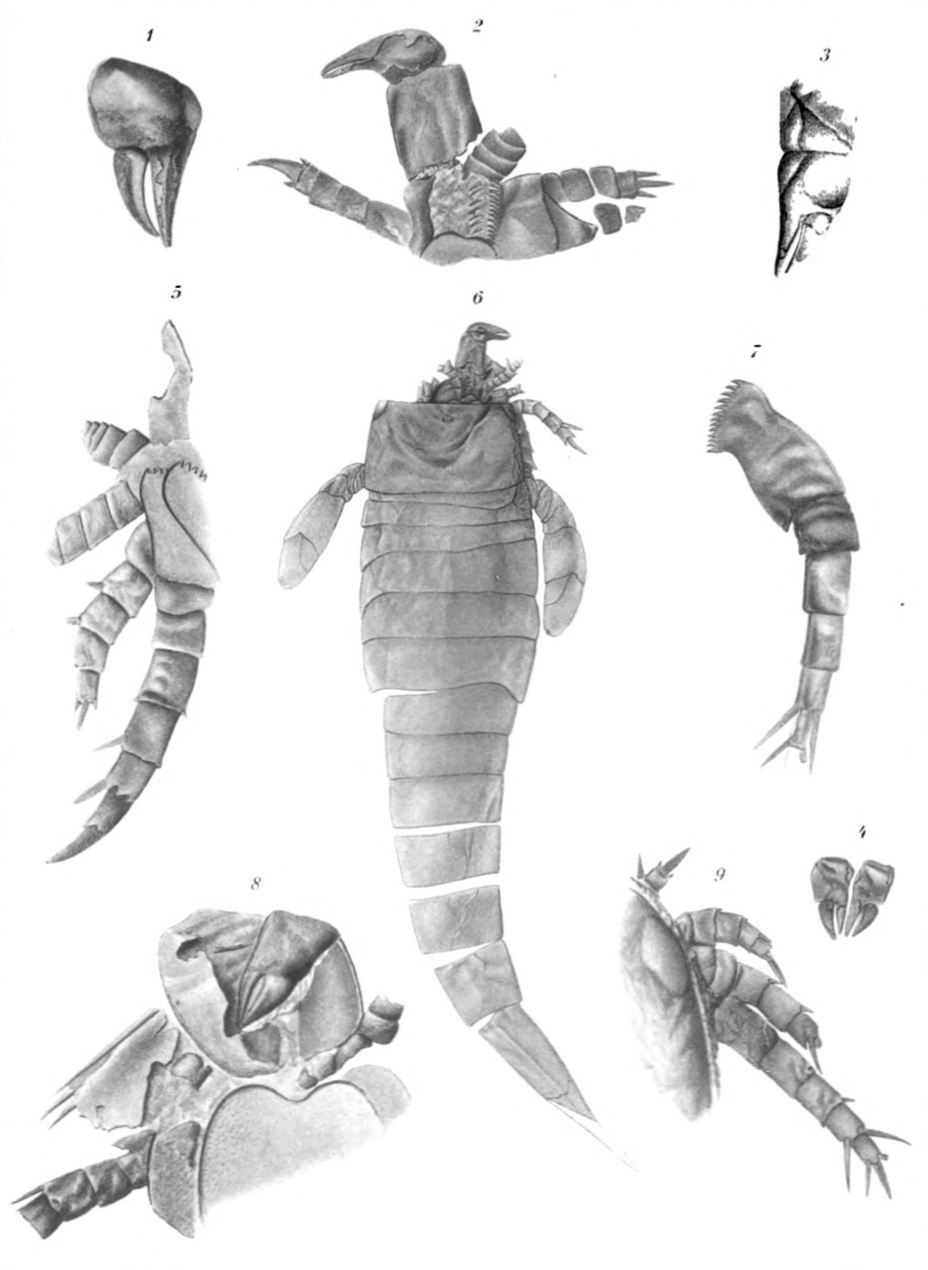
- Fossils of the Silurian eurypterid ("sea scorpion") Hughmilleria
  †Hughmilleria
  - †Hughmilleria shawangunk
  - †Hughmilleria socialis
- †Hungerfordia
  - †Hungerfordia dichotoma
- †Hyattidina
  - †Hyattidina congesta
- †Hyboaspis
  - †Hyboaspis depressa
- †Hyenia
  - †Hyenia banksii
- †Hyolithellus
  - †Hyolithellus micans
  - †Hyolithellus papillatus – type locality for species
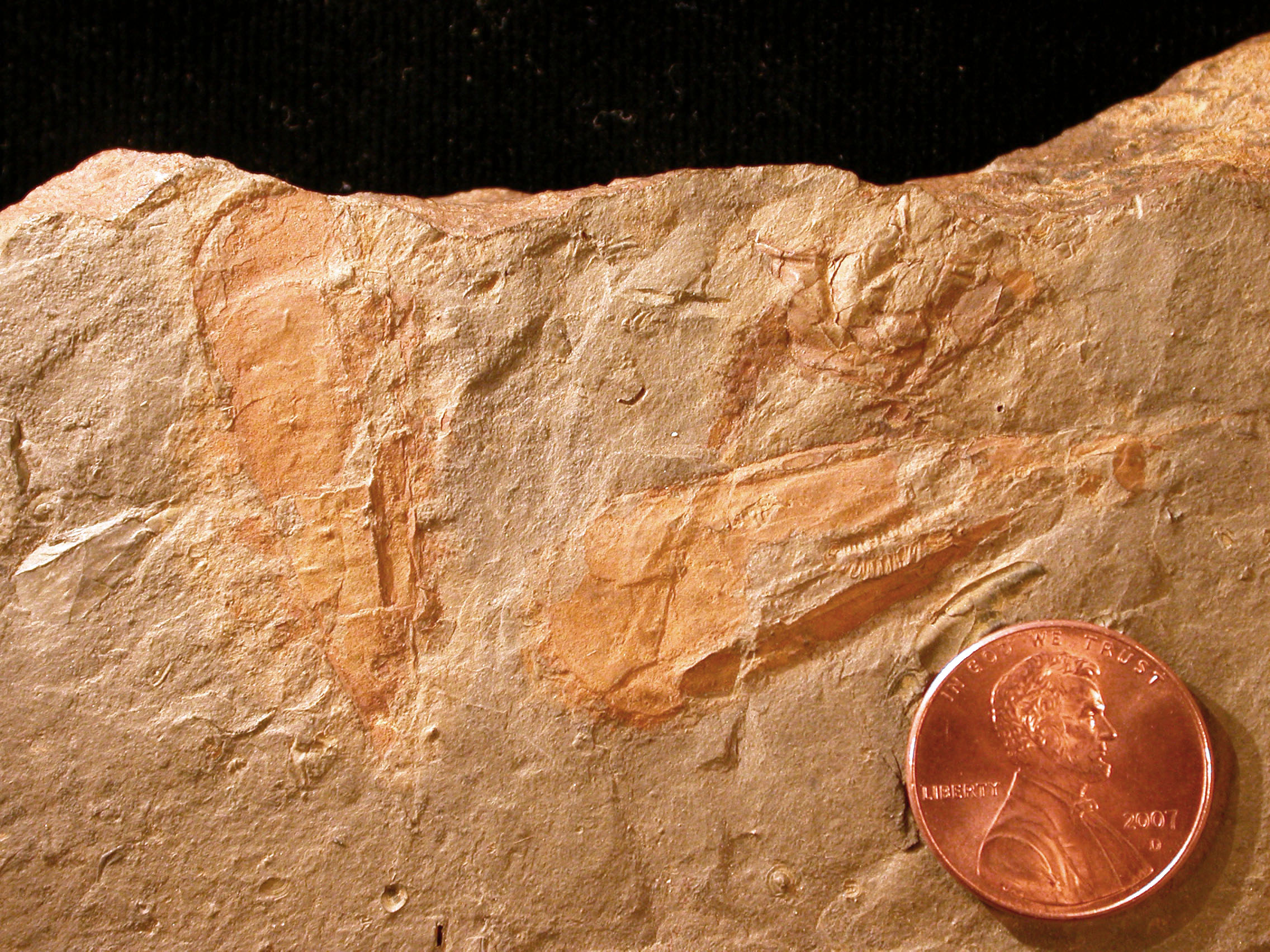
- Fossilized shells of the Cambrian-Permian brachiopod relative Hyolitha
  †Hyolithes
  - †Hyolithes aclis
  - †Hyolithes americanus
  - †Hyolithes gibbosus
- †Hypagnostus
- †Hyperoblastus
  - †Hyperoblastus goldringae
- †Hypodicranotus
  - †Hypodicranotus striatulus
- †Hypothyridina
  - †Hypothyridina venestula
  - †Hypothyridina venustula
- †Hysterolites
  - †Hysterolites perimele
- †Hystricurus
  - †Hystricurus conicus – or unidentified comparable form
  - †Hystricurus ellipticus

== I ==
- †Ibyka
  - †Ibyka amphikoma
- †Ichthyocrinus
  - †Ichthyocrinus laevis
- †Icriodella
  - †Icriodella superba
- †Icriodus
  - †Icriodus alternatus
- †Icthyocrinus
  - †Icthyocrinus conoideus
  - †Icthyocrinus laevis
  - †Icthyocrinus subangulatus
- †Idiospira – tentative report
  - †Idiospira longa – type locality for species
- †Illaenoides
- †Illaenus
  - †Illaenus incertus
  - †Illaenus punctatus
- †Inocaulis
  - †Inocaulis aborescens
- †Insolitotheca – type locality for genus
  - †Insolitotheca communis
- †Intexodictyon
  - †Intexodictyon manliusense – type locality for species
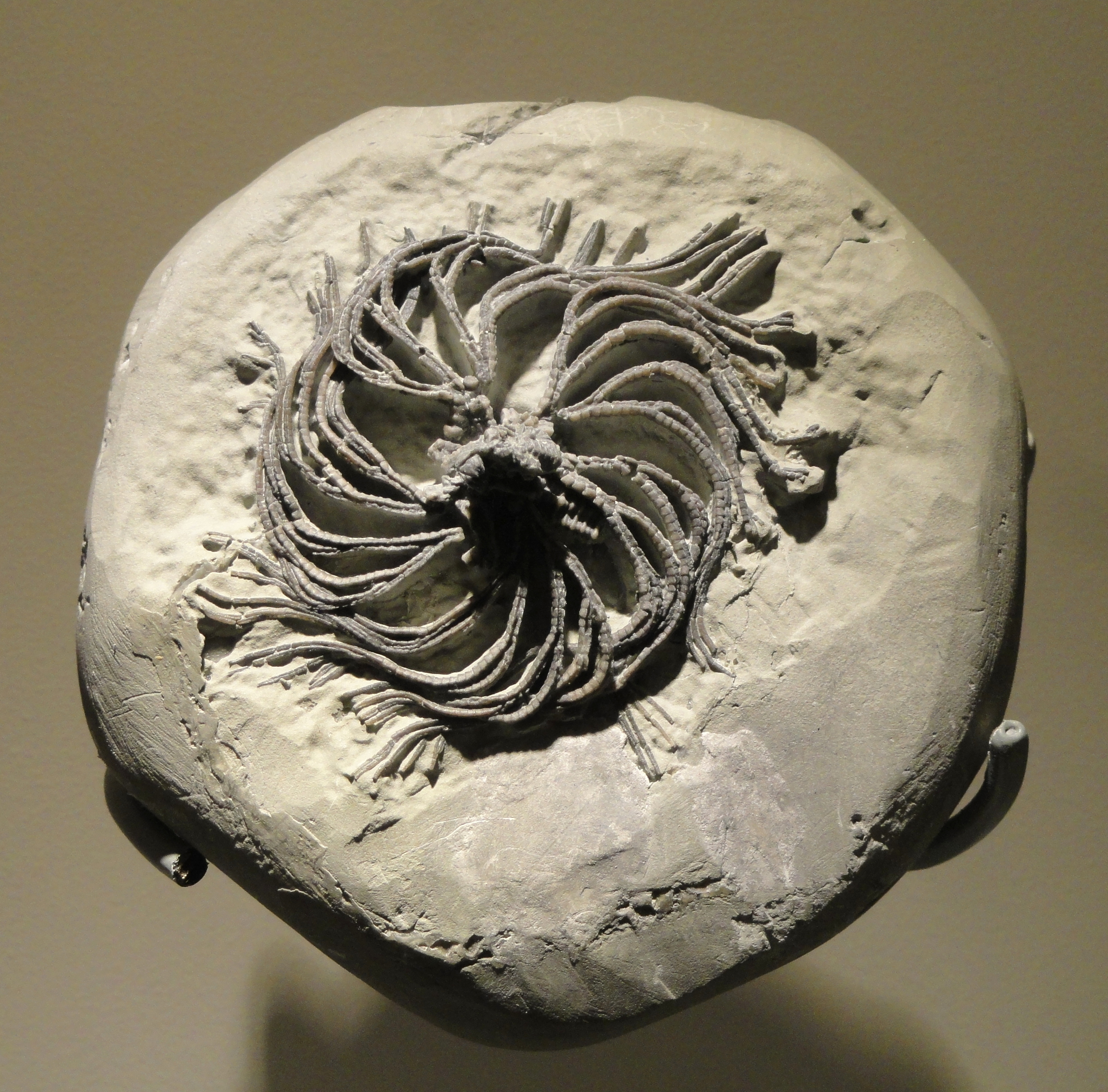
- Fossil of the Ordovician crinoid ("sea lily") Iocrinus
  †Iocrinus
  - †Iocrinus subcrassus
  - †Iocrinus trentonensis
- †Iridistrophia
  - †Iridistrophia radiata – or unidentified comparable form
- †Iridopteris
  - †Iridopteris eriensis
- †Ischadites
  - †Ischadites planoconvexa
  - †Ischadites planoconvexum
  - †Ischadites planoconvexus
- †Ischyrodonta
  - †Ischyrodonta unionoides
- †Ischyrotoma
- †Isochilina
  - †Isochilina labrosa
- †Isograptus
- †Isorthis
  - †Isorthis perelegans
  - †Isorthis proinqua
  - †Isorthis propinqua
- †Isoteloides
  - †Isoteloides canalis
  - †Isoteloides peri
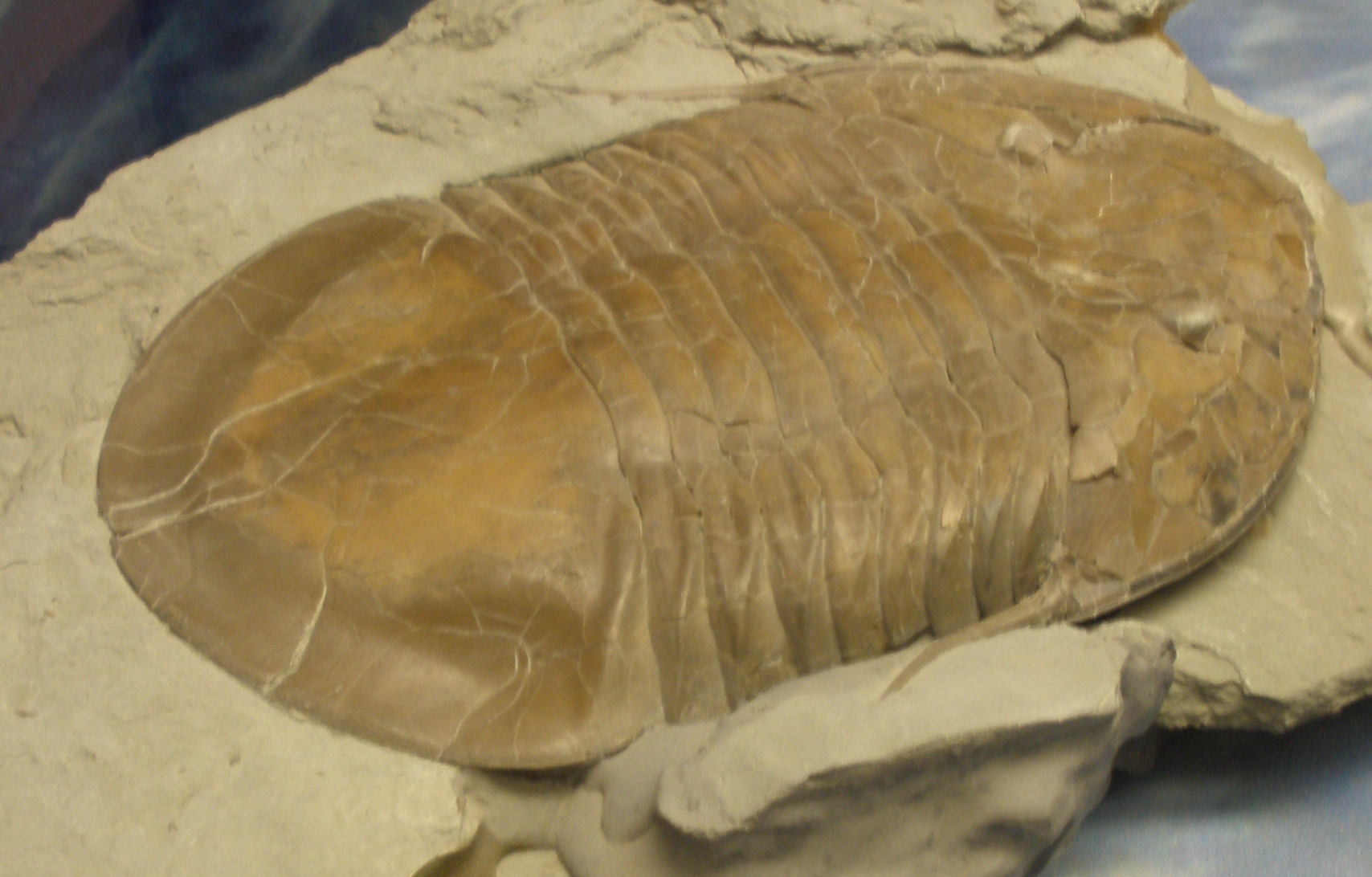
- Fossil of the Middle-Late Ordovician giant trilobite Isotelus.
  †Isotelus
  - †Isotelus angusticaudum
  - †Isotelus bearsi
  - †Isotelus canalis
  - †Isotelus gigas
  - †Isotelus gingas
  - †Isotelus harrisi
  - †Isotelus obtusum
  - †Isotelus obtusus
  - †Isotelus simplex
  - †Isotelus walcotti
- †Ithacadictya – type locality for genus
  - †Ithacadictya cornelli – type locality for species

== J ==
- †Janusella
- †Jenningsina
  - †Jenningsina catenulata
- †Joleaudella
  - †Joleaudella catilloides
- †Jonesina
  - †Jonesina apoglypha – type locality for species
- †Jordanopora
  - †Jordanopora heroensis

== K ==
- †Katabuporhynchus
  - †Katabuporhynchus mesacostalis
- †Kawina
  - †Kawina chazyensis
- †Keithiella
- †Keraiaceras – tentative report
  - †Keraiaceras percostatum
- †Keriaceras – tentative report
  - †Keriaceras percostatum
- †Kiaeropterus
  - †Kiaeropterus otisius
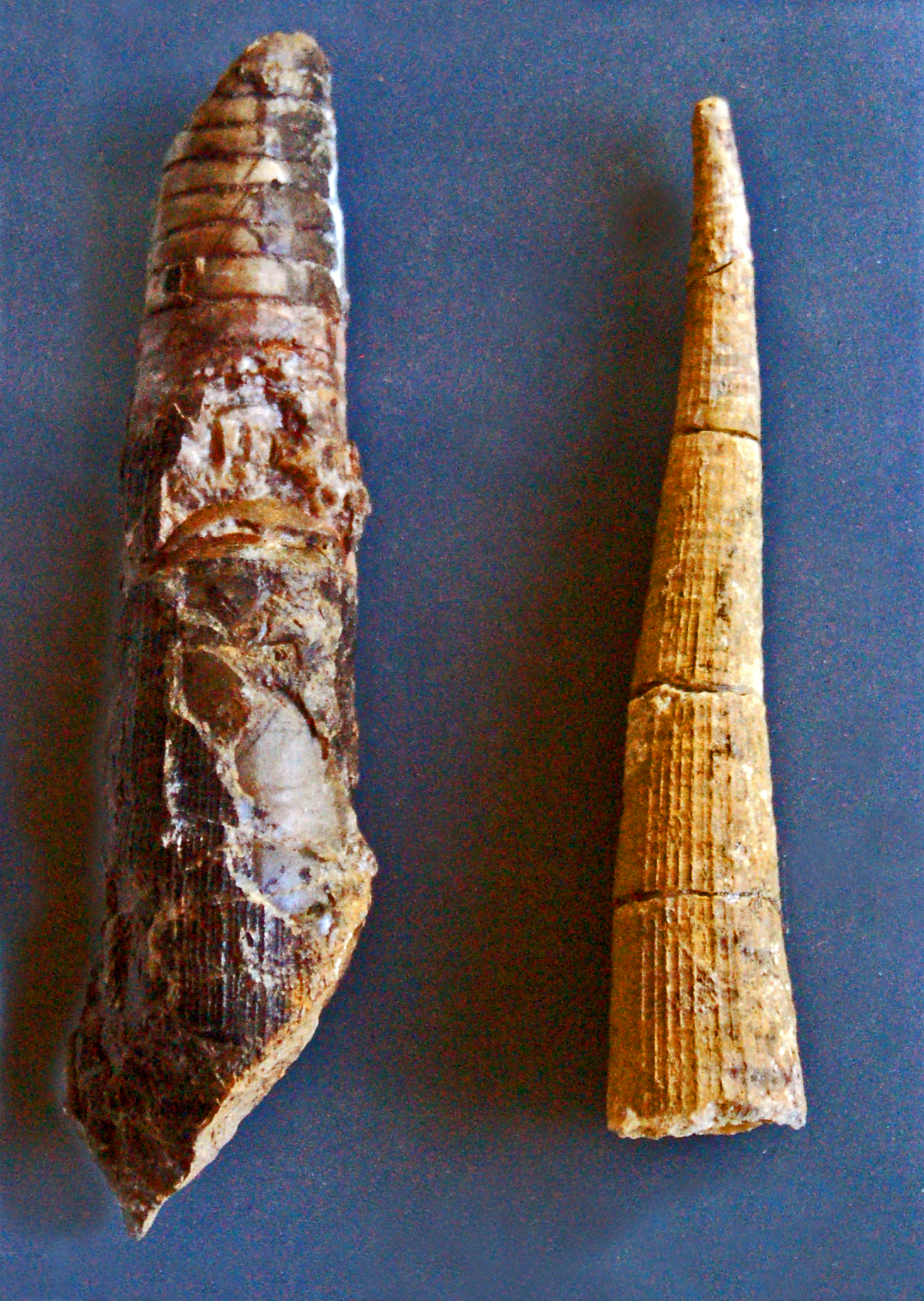
- Fossilized shells of the Middle Ordovician-Permian nautiloid cephalopod Kionoceras
  †Kionoceras
  - †Kionoceras cancellatum
  - †Kionoceras erraticum – type locality for species
  - †Kionoceras infrequens – type locality for species
  - †Kionoceras polyplicatum – type locality for species
  - †Kionoceras profundum
  - †Kionoceras valcourense – type locality for species
- †Kirkbyella
  - †Kirkbyella tora – type locality for species
  - †Kirkbyella unicornis
  - †Kirkbyella verticalis
- †Kitikamispira
  - †Kitikamispira concinna – type locality for species
  - †Kitikamispira hamiltoniae
- †Kloedenella
- †Kloedenia
- †Knorria
  - †Knorria chemungensis
- †Knoxiella
  - †Knoxiella reticulata – type locality for species
- †Kockelella
  - †Kockelella ortus
  - †Kockelella ranuliformis
  - †Kockelella walliseri
- †Koenenia
  - †Koenenia emarginata
- †Koenenites
  - †Koenenites beckeri – type locality for species
  - †Koenenites cooperi
  - †Koenenites fasciculatus
  - †Koenenites styliophilus – type locality for species
- †Kophinocrinus
  - †Kophinocrinus spiniferous
  - †Kophinocrinus spiniferus
- †Kozlowskiellina
  - †Kozlowskiellina perlamellosa
- †Kyphosocrinus
  - †Kyphosocrinus tetreaulti

== L ==
- †Labechia
  - †Labechia eatoni
  - †Labechia prima – type locality for species
  - †Labechia pustulosa – or unidentified comparable form
  - †Labechia valcourensis – type locality for species
- †Lambeophyllum
  - †Lambeophyllum profundum
- †Lamottoceras
  - †Lamottoceras franklini
- †Lamottopora
  - †Lamottopora duncanae
- †Lapworthella
  - †Lapworthella schodakensis
- †Lasiocrinus
  - †Lasiocrinus scoparius
- †Laurentoscandodus
  - †Laurentoscandodus triangularis
  - †Laurentoscandodus triangulatus
- †Lawrenceoceras
  - †Lawrenceoceras breve
  - †Lawrenceoceras confertissimum
- †Lecanocrinus
  - †Lecanocrinus macropetalus
  - †Lecanocrinus magnaradialis
  - †Lecanocrinus pusillus – or unidentified comparable form
- †Lecanospira
  - †Lecanospira compacta
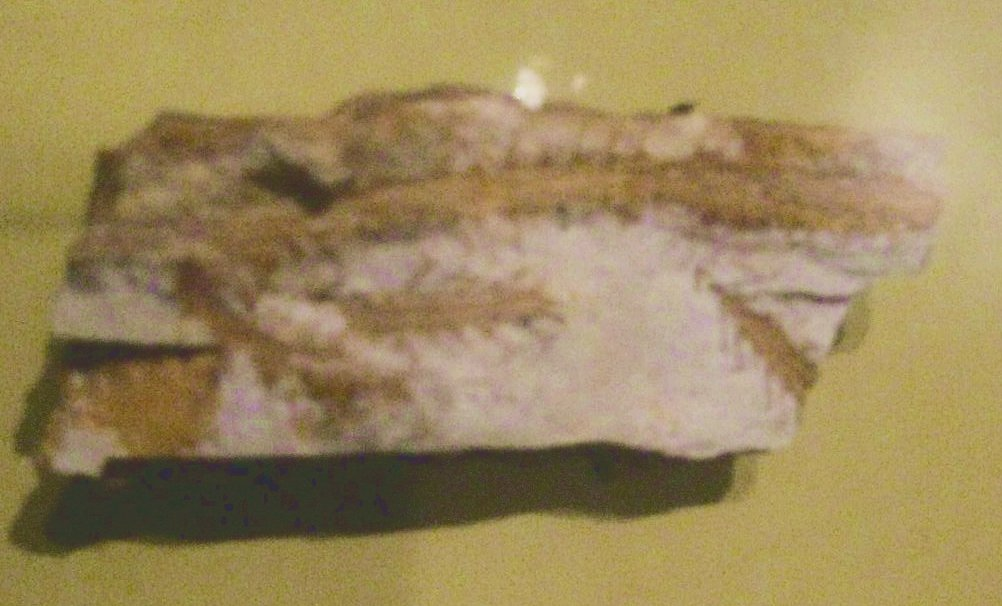
- Fossils of the Middle Devonian clubmoss Leclercqia
  †Leclercqia
  - †Leclercqia complexa
- †Leidosigillaria – or unidentified comparable form
- †Leioclema
  - †Leioclema aspera
  - †Leioclema asperum
  - †Leioclema confertiporum
  - †Leioclema decipiens
  - †Leioclema florida
- †Leiocorphyge – tentative report
  - †Leiocorphyge lobata – type locality for species
- †Leiocoryphe – tentative report
  - †Leiocoryphe lobata
- †Leiopyge
- †Leiorhynchus
  - †Leiorhynchus laura
  - †Leiorhynchus limitare
  - †Leiorhynchus limitaris
  - †Leiorhynchus mesacarina
  - †Leiorhynchus multicostum
  - †Leiorhynchus multiscostum – tentative report
  - †Leiorhynchus quadracostata
  - †Leiorhynchus quadracostatus
  - †Leiorhynchus quadricostatum
  - †Leiorhynchus sinuata
  - †Leiorhynchus sinuatum
  - †Leiorhynchus ventricosum
- †Leperditia
  - †Leperditia alta
  - †Leperditia canadensis
  - †Leperditia fabulites
  - †Leperditia limatula
  - †Leperditia nana
  - †Leperditia scalaris
- †Lepidocoleus
  - †Lepidocoleus jamesi
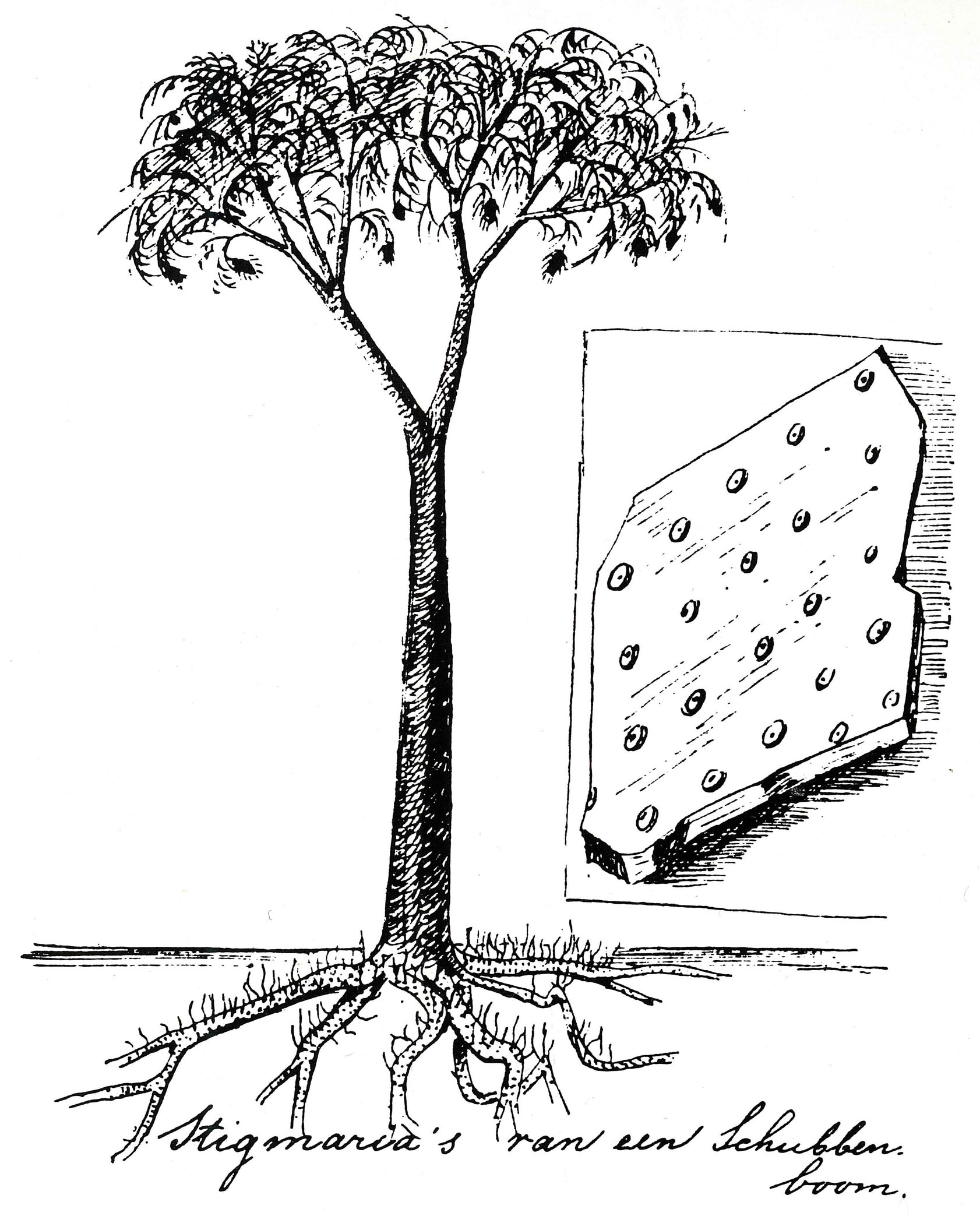
- Restoration of the Carboniferous-Late Triassic club moss relative Lepidodendron. Eli Heimans (1911).
  †Lepidodendron
  - †Lepidodendron chemungense
- †Lepidosigillaria
  - †Lepidosigillaria whitei
- †Lepocrinites
  - †Lepocrinites gebhardi
  - †Lepocrinites gebhardii
- †Leptaean
  - †Leptaean rhomboidalis – report made of unidentified related form or using admittedly obsolete nomenclature
- †Leptaena
  - †Leptaena moniquensis
  - †Leptaena ordovicica
  - †Leptaena rhomboidalis
- †Leptaenisca
- †Leptobolus
  - †Leptobolus insigna
  - †Leptobolus insignis
- †Leptochilodiscus
- †Leptocoelia
  - †Leptocoelia flabellites
- †Leptodesma
  - †Leptodesma bigsbyi
  - †Leptodesma billingsi
  - †Leptodesma clitus
  - †Leptodesma conradi
  - †Leptodesma dekayi
  - †Leptodesma extenuatum
  - †Leptodesma jason
  - †Leptodesma laevis
  - †Leptodesma lichas
  - †Leptodesma mathori
  - †Leptodesma mesacostalis
  - †Leptodesma mortoni
  - †Leptodesma naviforme
  - †Leptodesma nitida
  - †Leptodesma potens
  - †Leptodesma propinquum
  - †Leptodesma rafinesqui
  - †Leptodesma rhomboidea
  - †Leptodesma rhomboideum
  - †Leptodesma sayi
  - †Leptodesma spinerigum
  - †Leptodesma spinigerum
  - †Leptodesma striatula
  - †Leptodesma striatus
  - †Leptodesma subplana
  - †Leptodesma torregi
  - †Leptodesma waviformes
- †Leptograptus
  - †Leptograptus annectans
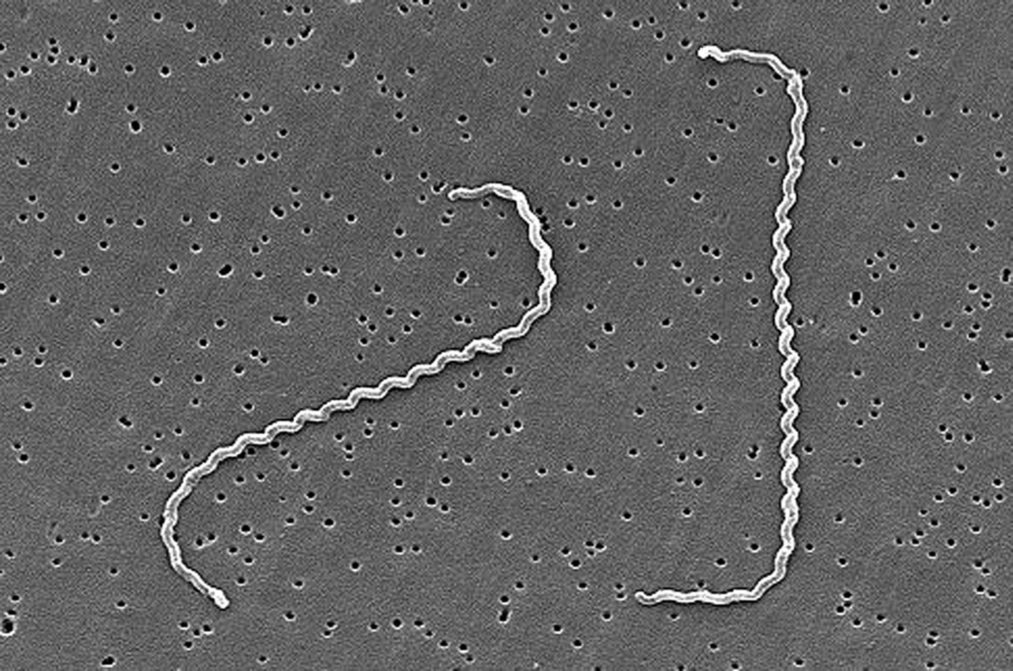
- Leptospira
  †Leptospira
  - †Leptospira gibbosa
- †Leptostrophia
  - †Leptostrophia beckii
  - †Leptostrophia bipartita
  - †Leptostrophia planulata
- †Leptotrypella
  - †Leptotrypella amplectens
  - †Leptotrypella asterica
  - †Leptotrypella multitecta
- †Levenea
  - †Levenea subcarinata
- †Levenia
  - †Levenia lenticularis
- Life restoration of the Early Ordovician nautiloid cephalopod Levisoceras
  †Levisoceras
- †Liacalymene
- †Lichenalia
  - †Lichenalia concentrica
- †Lichenocrinus
- †Lidstroemella
  - †Lidstroemella aspidum
- †Limoptera
  - †Limoptera macroptera
- †Limuloides – tentative report
- †Linguatornoceras
  - †Linguatornoceras linguum – or unidentified related form
- †Linguella
  - †Linguella granvillensis – or unidentified comparable form
- †Lingula
  - †Lingula allingi – type locality for species
  - †Lingula clintoni
  - †Lingula complanata
  - †Lingula curta
  - †Lingula densa
  - †Lingula desiderata
  - †Lingula lamellata
  - †Lingula oblata
  - †Lingula procne
  - †Lingula punctata
  - †Lingula riciniformis
  - †Lingula semina
  - †Lingula spatulata
  - †Lingula vicina
- †Lingulapholis – tentative report
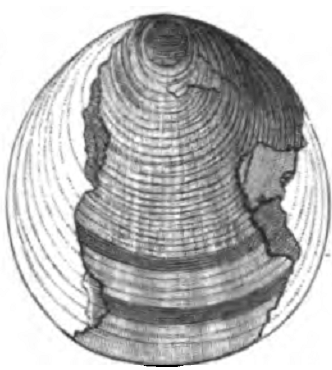
- Illustration of a fossilized shell of the Cambrian-Late Ordovician brachiopod Lingulella
  †Lingulella
  - †Lingulella brainerdi
  - †Lingulella columba
  - †Lingulella granvillensis
  - †Lingulella prima
- †Lingulepis
  - †Lingulepis acuminata
- †Linnarssonia
- †Linoporella
- †Liocalymene
  - †Liocalymene clintonensis
  - †Liocalymene clintoni
  - †Liocalymene niagarensis
- †Liomphalus
  - †Liomphalus disjunctus
- †Liospira
  - †Liospira americana
- †Lobobactrites
  - †Lobobactrites clavus
- †Lobotornoceras
  - †Lobotornoceras hassoni – or unidentified related form
- †Loculipora
  - †Loculipora perforata
- †Logocrinus
  - †Logocrinus geniculatus
- †Lonchocephalus
  - †Lonchocephalus calciferus
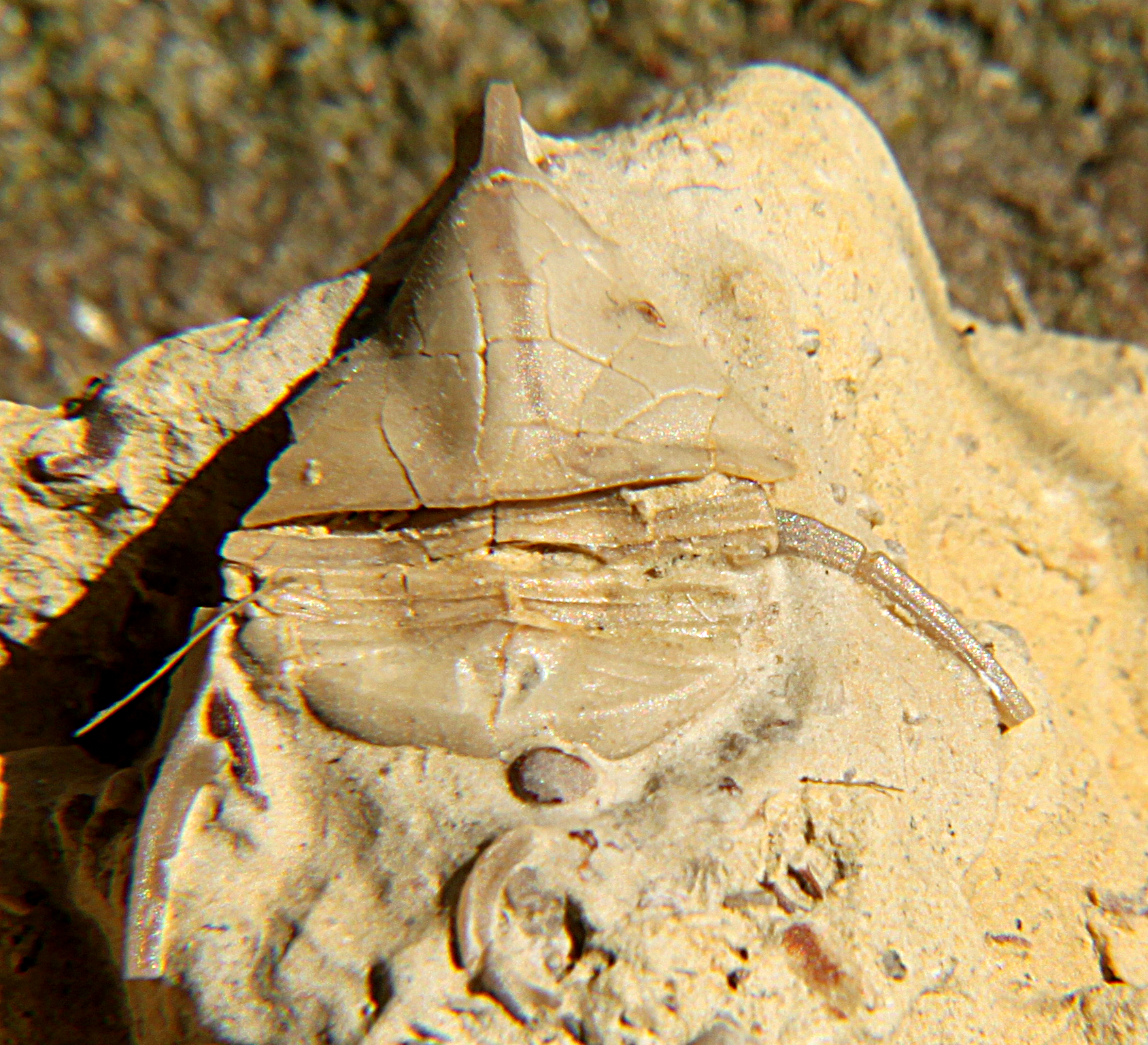
- Fossil of the Ordovician trilobite Lonchodomas
  †Lonchodomas
  - †Lonchodomas chaziensis
  - †Lonchodomas halli
- †Longispina
  - †Longispina mucronata
  - †Longispina mucronatus
- †Longstaffia
  - †Longstaffia pulchra
- †Lophospira
  - †Lophospira billingsi
  - †Lophospira perangulata
  - †Lophospira rectistriata
  - †Lophospira ventricosa
- †Loxodus
  - †Loxodus bransoni
- †Loxonema
  - †Loxonema bertiense – tentative report
  - †Loxonema postremum
- †Loxophragma
  - †Loxophragma lechrium
- †Loxoplocus
  - †Loxoplocus gothlandicus – type locality for species
- †Lucasella – tentative report
  - †Lucasella spinulifera
- †Lunulacardium
  - †Lunulacardium curtum
  - †Lunulacardium marcellense
  - †Lunulacardium ornatum
- †Luprisca – type locality for genus
  - †Luprisca incuba – type locality for species
- †Lyriocrinus
  - †Lyriocrinus dactylus
- †Lyriopecten
  - †Lyriopecten orbiculatus
- †Lyrodesma
  - †Lyrodesma poststriatum

== M ==
- †Macgeea
  - †Macgeea ponderosa – type locality for species
- †Machaeraria
- †Mackinnonia
  - †Mackinnonia rostratum – type locality for species
  - †Mackinnonia taconica – type locality for species
- †Macluritella
  - †Macluritella imperfecta – type locality for species
  - †Macluritella multiseptarius – type locality for species
  - †Macluritella uniangulata
- †Maclurites
  - †Maclurites magnus
- †Macrochilina
  - †Macrochilina pygmaea
  - †Macrochilina seneca
- †Macrocoelia
  - †Macrocoelia champlainensis
  - †Macrocoelia ruedemanni
- †Macropleura
  - †Macropleura eudora
  - †Macropleura macropleura
- †Macrostylocrinus
  - †Macrostylocrinus fusibrachiatus
  - †Macrostylocrinus granulosus – or unidentified comparable form
  - †Macrostylocrinus ornatus
- †Maeneceras
  - †Maeneceras acutolaterale – or unidentified related form
- †Malocystites
  - †Malocystites emmonsi
  - †Malocystites murchisoni
- †Manticeras
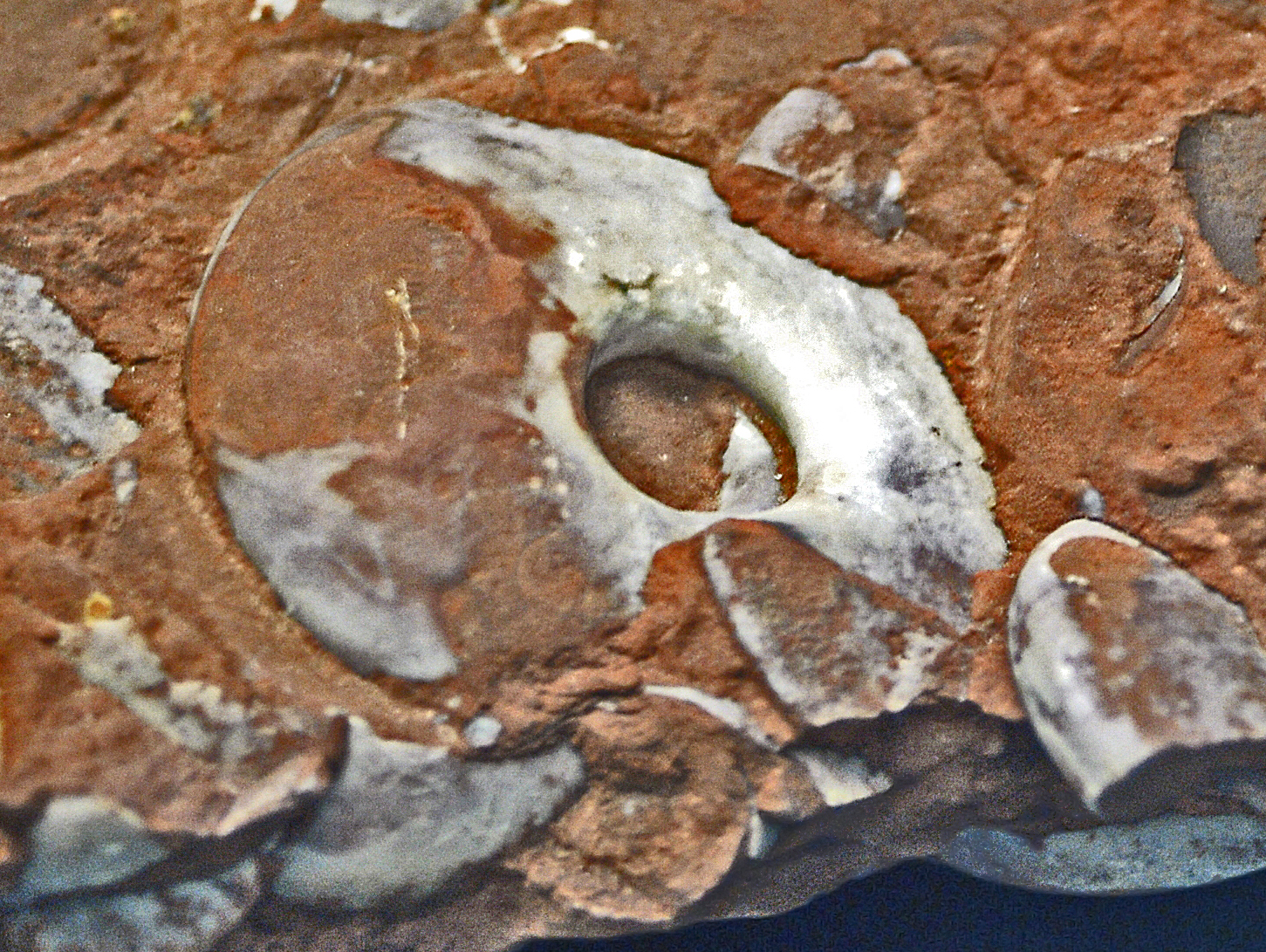
- Fossilized shell of the Devonian ammonoid cephalopod Manticoceras
  †Manticoceras
  - †Manticoceras contractum
  - †Manticoceras lamed
  - †Manticoceras nodifer
  - †Manticoceras sinuosum
- †Mariacrinus – report made of unidentified related form or using admittedly obsolete nomenclature
  - †Mariacrinus stoloniferus
- †Marsupiocrinus
  - †Marsupiocrinus tentaculatus
- †Mastigobolbina
  - †Mastigobolbina clarkei
  - †Mastigobolbina decora
  - †Mastigobolbina incipiens
  - †Mastigobolbina lata
  - †Mastigobolbina punctata
  - †Mastigobolbina retifera
  - †Mastigobolbina trilobata
  - †Mastigobolbina trilobatus
  - †Mastigobolbina trilobita
  - †Mastigobolbina typus
  - †Mastigobolbina vanuxemi
- †Mastigograptus
- †Matherella – type locality for genus
  - †Matherella saratogensis
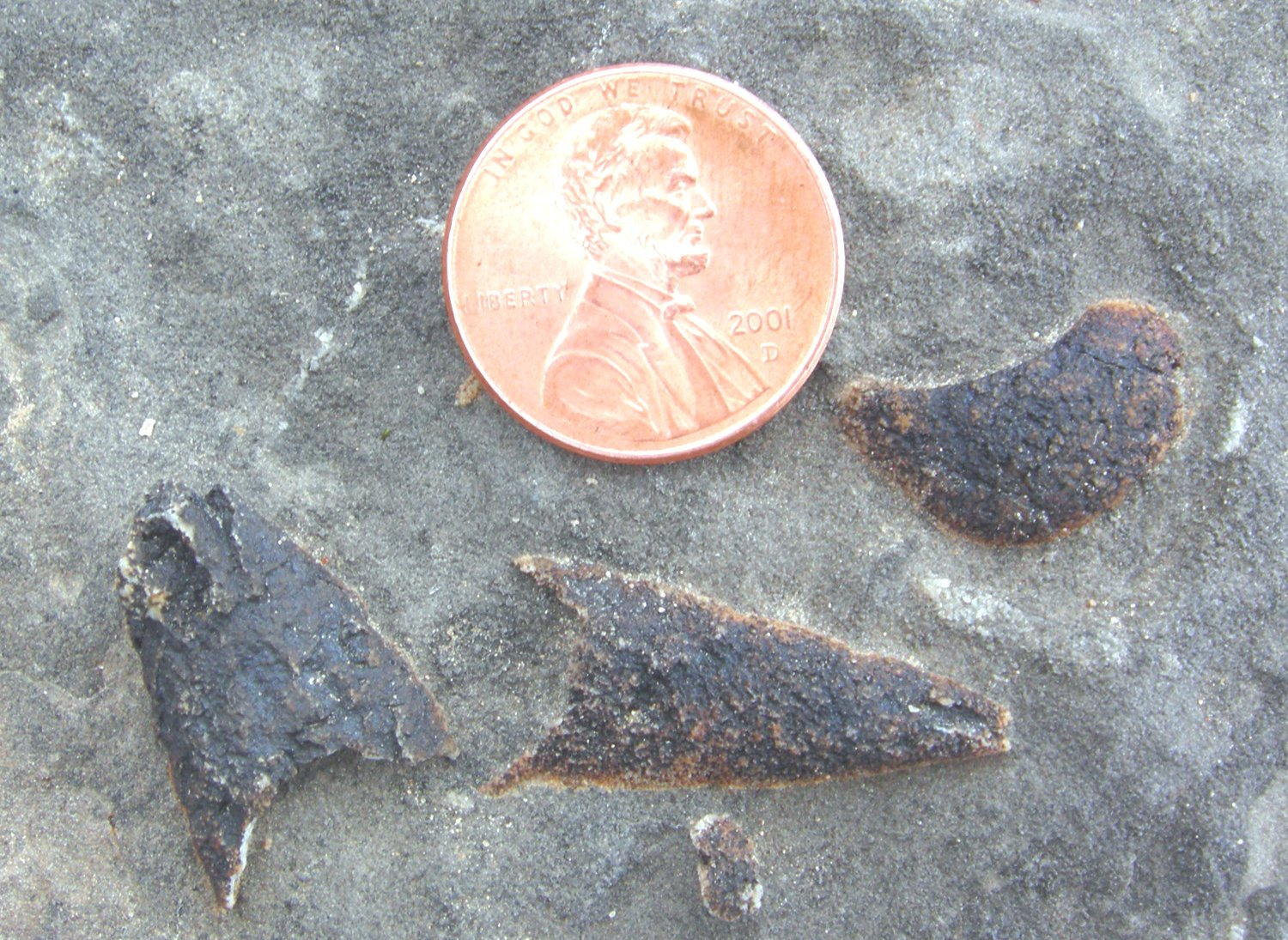
- Fossilized plates of the Cambrian-Early Ordovician chiton Matthevia
  †Matthevia
- †Mccluskiceras – type locality for genus
  - †Mccluskiceras comstockense – type locality for species
- †Mclearnites
- †Mcqueenoceras
  - †Mcqueenoceras jeffersonense – or unidentified related form
- †Meadowtownella
  - †Meadowtownella trentonensis
- †Mediospirifer
  - †Mediospirifer angustus
  - †Mediospirifer audaculus
  - †Mediospirifer mucronatus
- †Medusaegraptus
  - †Medusaegraptus graminiformis
- †Medusagraptus
- †Megakozlowkiella
  - †Megakozlowkiella sculptilis
- †Megakozlowskiella
  - †Megakozlowskiella perlamellosa – or unidentified comparable form
  - †Megakozlowskiella raricosta
  - †Megakozlowskiella sculptilis
  - †Megakozlowskiella sculptis
- †Megambonia
  - †Megambonia aviculoidea
- †Meganterella
  - †Meganterella finksi
- †Megastrophia
  - †Megastrophia concava
  - †Megastrophia hemisphaerica
  - †Megastrophia hemispherica
  - †Megastrophia hemisphericus
  - †Megastrophia profunda
- †Megastylia
- †Megistocrinus
  - †Megistocrinus depressus
- †Mellopegma – tentative report
  - †Mellopegma georginensis – tentative report
- †Melocrinus
  - †Melocrinus ornatus – type locality for species
- †Mendacella
- †Meniscoceras
  - †Meniscoceras coronense
- †Menoeidina
  - †Menoeidina multipuncata – type locality for species
  - †Menoeidina versicula – type locality for species
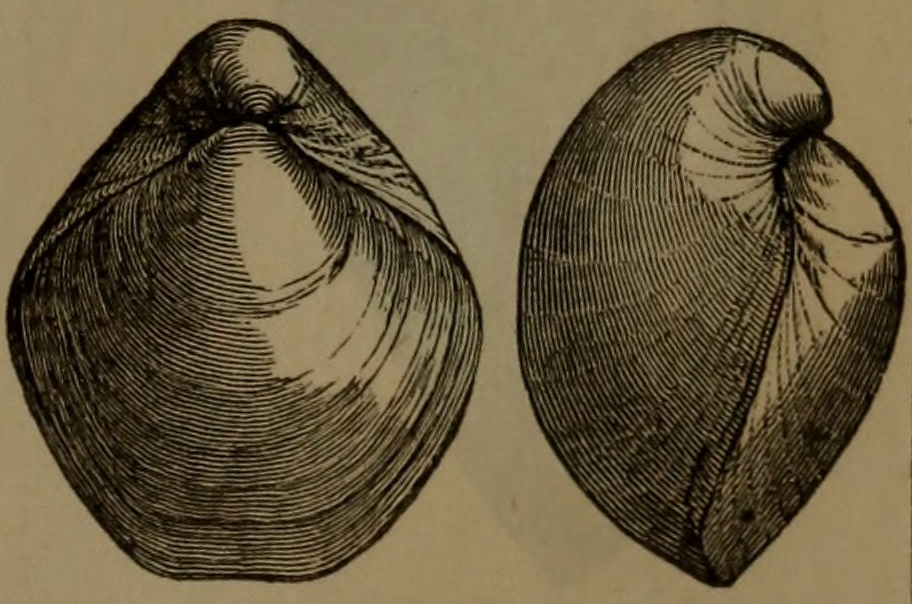
- Illustration (lower right, entry 15) of a fossilized shell in front and side views of the Silurian-Late Devonian brachiopod Meristella
  †Meristella
  - †Meristella arcuata
  - †Meristella barissi
  - †Meristella barrisi
  - †Meristella doris
  - †Meristella haskinsi
  - †Meristella laevis
  - †Meristella nasuta
  - †Meristella praenuntia
  - †Meristella princeps
  - †Meristella scitula
- †Meristina
  - †Meristina nasuta
- †Merocrinus
  - †Merocrinus corroboratus
  - †Merocrinus typus
- †Mesocoelia
  - †Mesocoelia gregaria – or unidentified comparable form
- †Mesodouvillina
  - †Mesodouvillina varistriata
- †Mesoleptosrophia
  - †Mesoleptosrophia junia
- †Mesoleptostrophia
  - †Mesoleptostrophia junia
- †Mesopalaeaster – tentative report
  - †Mesopalaeaster lanceolatus
- †Mesotrypa
  - †Mesotrypa numiformis
  - †Mesotrypa nummiformis
- †Metabaltoceras – type locality for genus
  - †Metabaltoceras fusiforme – type locality for species
- †Metaconularia
- †Metaplasia
  - †Metaplasia minuta
- †Metriophyllum
- †Michelia
  - †Michelia whiteavesi – type locality for species
- †Michelinia
  - †Michelinia stylopora
- †Michelinoceras
  - †Michelinoceras aldenense
  - †Michelinoceras rigidum
- †Microchilina
- †Microcyclus
- †Microdisca
- †Micromitra
- †Mictophyllum
  - †Mictophyllum orientalis – type locality for species
- †Millardicurus
- †Mimella
  - †Mimella borealis
  - †Mimella vulgaris
- †Mirabiloceras
  - †Mirabiloceras multitubulatum
- †Missisquoia
  - †Missisquoia typicalis
- †Mitroceras
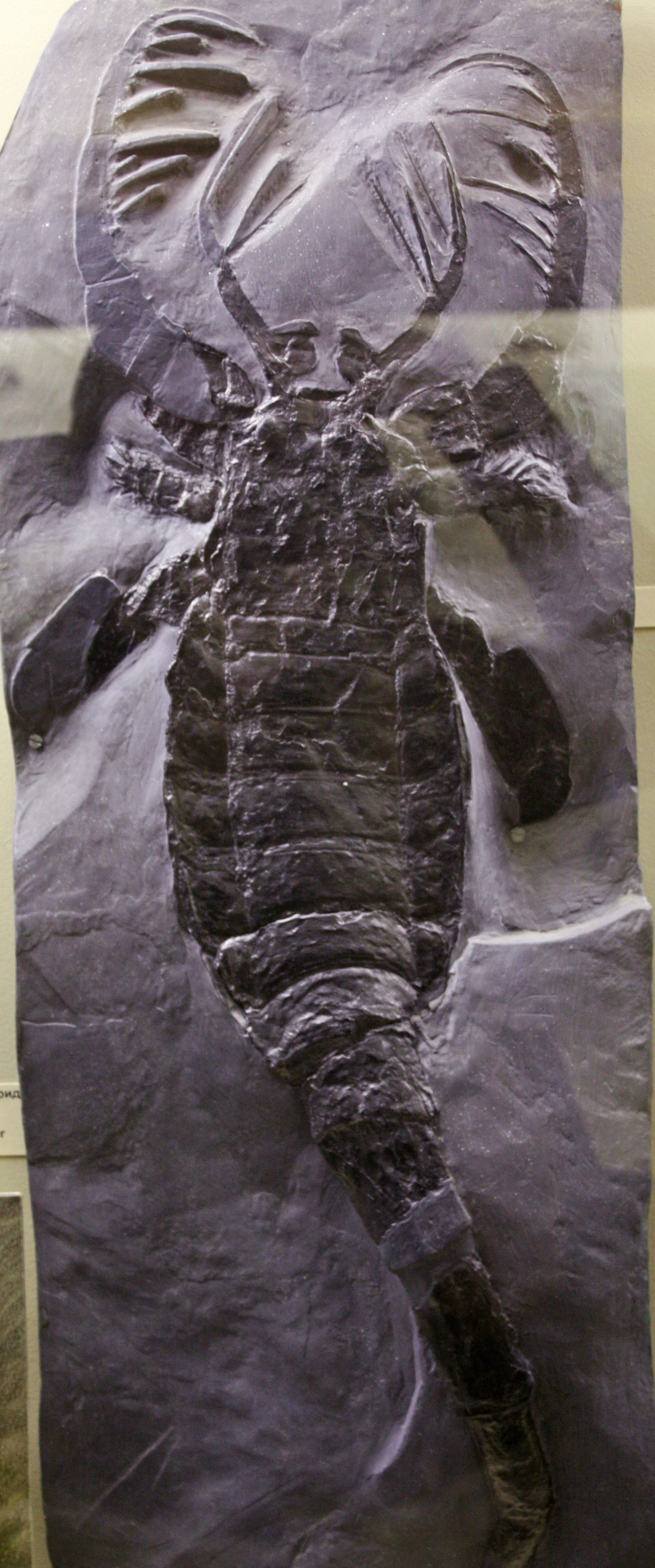
- Fossil of the Silurian eurypterid ("sea scorpion") Mixopterus
  †Mixopterus
  - †Mixopterus multispinosus
- †Modiella
  - †Modiella pygmaea
- †Modiodesma
  - †Modiodesma modiolare
- †Modiolopsis
  - †Modiolopsis anodontoides
  - †Modiolopsis exanimis
  - †Modiolopsis fabaformis
  - †Modiolopsis modiolaris
  - †Modiolopsis orthoconcavus – type locality for species
  - †Modiolopsis ovata
  - †Modiolopsis subalata
  - †Modiolopsis subalatus
  - †Modiolopsis subcarinata
  - †Modiolopsis subcarinatus
- †Modiomorpha
  - †Modiomorpha chemungensis
  - †Modiomorpha concentrica
  - †Modiomorpha mutiloides
  - †Modiomorpha mytiloides
  - †Modiomorpha pygmaea
  - †Modiomorpha quadrula
  - †Modiomorpha subalata
- †Modiomorphia
  - †Modiomorphia alta
  - †Modiomorphia concentrica
  - †Modiomorphia mytiloides
- †Monoceratina
  - †Monoceratina casei
- †Monodechenella
  - †Monodechenella macrocephala
  - †Monodechenella macrocephalus
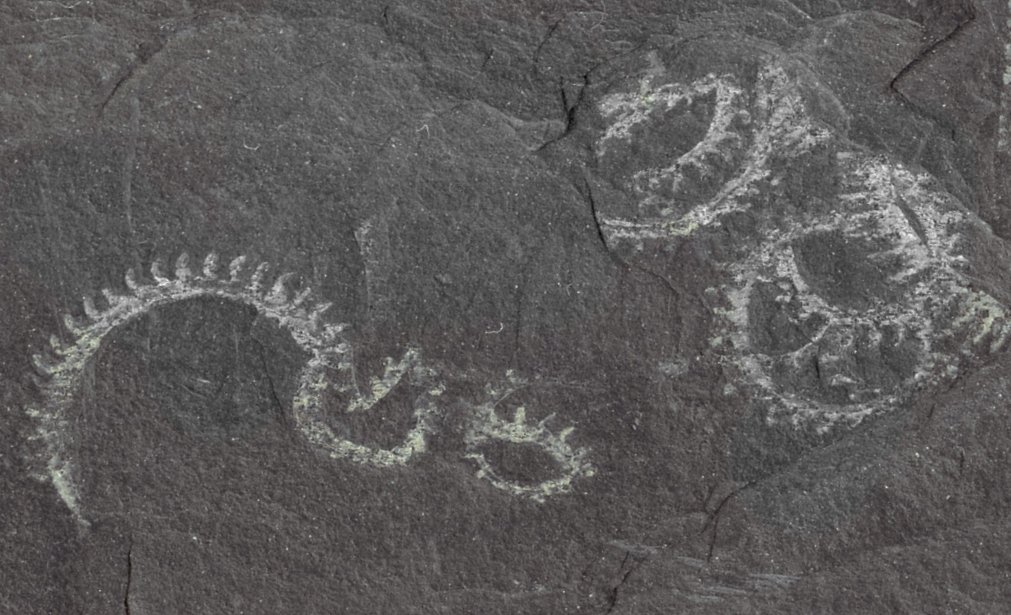
- Fossils of the Early Devonian graptolite Monograptus
  †Monograptus
  - †Monograptus clintonensis
- †Monotrypa
  - †Monotrypa benjamini
  - †Monotrypa osgoodensis – or unidentified comparable form
- †Monotrypella
  - †Monotrypella abrupta – tentative report
  - †Monotrypella arbuscula – tentative report
- †Montyoceras
  - †Montyoceras arcuatum
  - †Montyoceras curviseptatum
  - †Montyoceras titaniforme
- †Moorea
- †Morania
- †Mourlonia
  - †Mourlonia filitexta
  - †Mourlonia plena
  - †Mourlonia rugulata
  - †Mourlonia subzona – type locality for species
- †Mucopraeca
  - †Mucopraeca multicostata – type locality for species
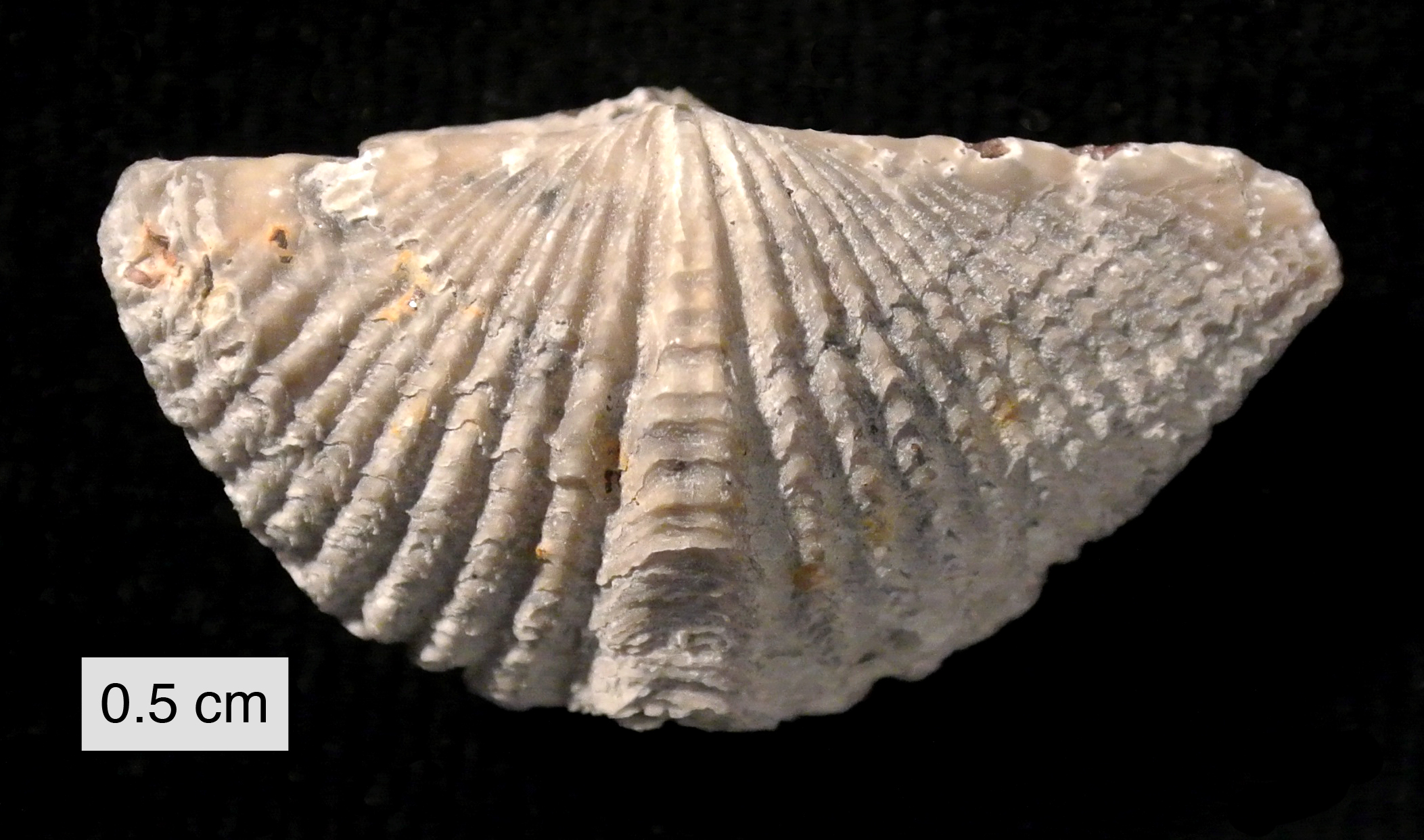
- Fossilized shell of the Devonian brachiopod Mucrospirifer
  †Mucrospirifer
  - †Mucrospirifer consobrinus
  - †Mucrospirifer mucronata
  - †Mucrospirifer mucronatus
  - †Mucrospirifer tulliensis
- †Mucrospirifier
  - †Mucrospirifier mucronatus
- †Mucrspirifer
  - †Mucrspirifer mucronatus
- †Mulceodens
  - †Mulceodens eboraceus – type locality for species
- †Multicostella
  - †Multicostella platys
- †Murchisonia
  - †Murchisonia micula
  - †Murchisonia subulata
- †Muscrospirifer
  - †Muscrospirifer mucronatus
- †Myalina – tentative report
  - †Myalina newelli
- †Myelodactylus
  - †Myelodactylus convolutus
  - †Myelodactylus linae
- †Mytilarca
  - †Mytilarca mytiliformis
  - †Mytilarca oviformis
- †Mytilops
  - †Mytilops praecedens

== N ==
- †Nanahughmilleria
  - †Nanahughmilleria clarkei
  - †Nanahughmilleria prominens
- †Nanillaenus
  - †Nanillaenus americanus
- †Nanno
  - †Nanno noveboracum
- †Nanothyris
  - †Nanothyris subglobosa – or unidentified comparable form
- †Naplesites
  - †Naplesites naplesense
- †Naticonema
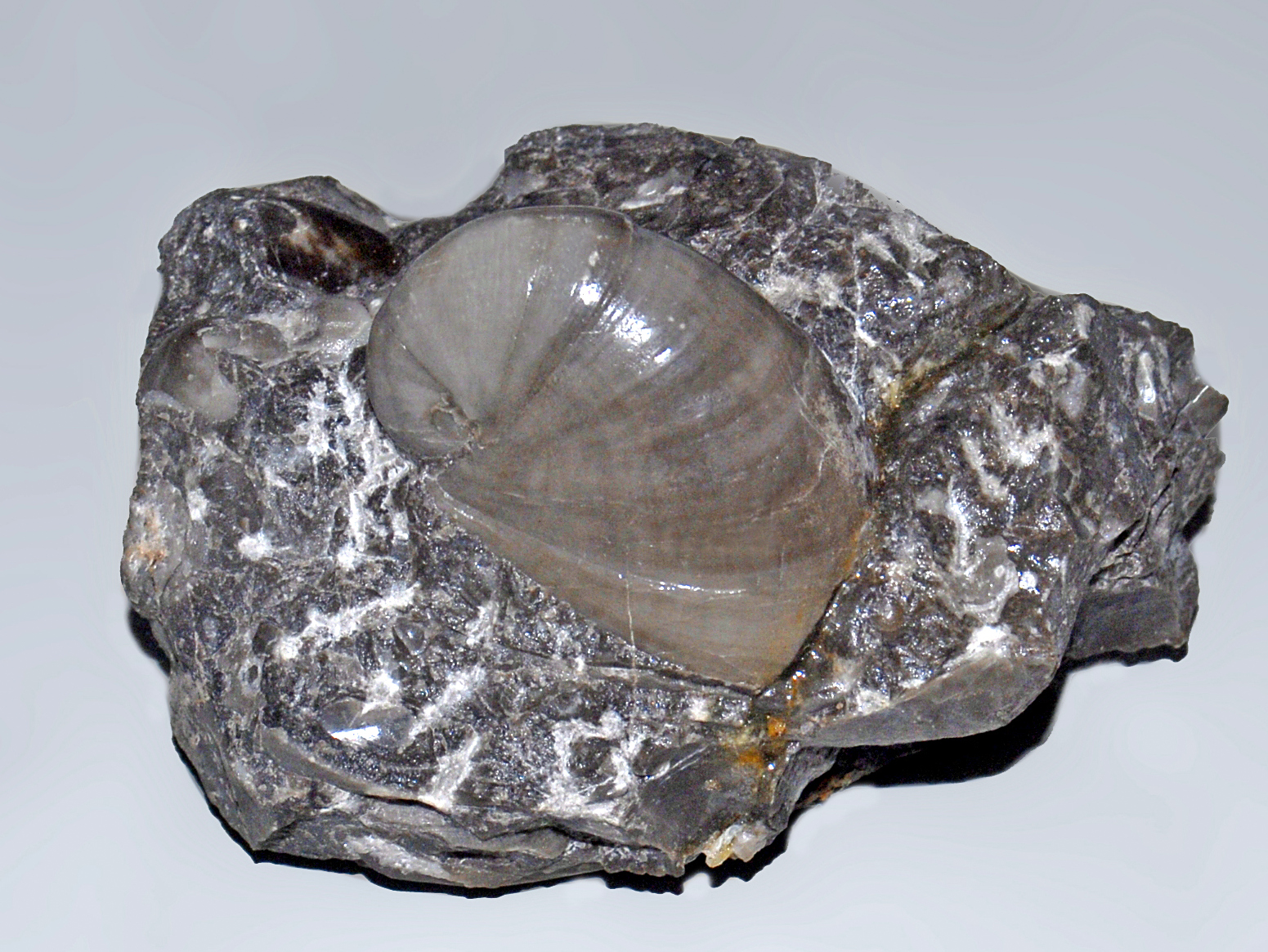
- Fossilized shell of the Early Devonian – Triassic sea snail Naticopsis
  †Naticopsis
- †Navispira – tentative report
- †Nemagraptus
- †Nematopora
  - †Nematopora ovalis
  - †Nematopora raripora
- †Neoaxon
- †Neokloedenella
- †Neozaphrentis
- †Nephriticeras
  - †Nephriticeras metula
- †Nervostrophia
  - †Nervostrophia nervosa
  - †Nervostrophia plana
  - †Nervostrophia tulliensis
- †Newportopora
  - †Newportopora typicalis
- †Niagaracrinus
  - †Niagaracrinus kopfi
- †Nicholsonella
  - †Nicholsonella florida
- †Nieszkowskia – tentative report
  - †Nieszkowskia satyrus
- †Nileoides
  - †Nileoides perkinsi
- †Niobe
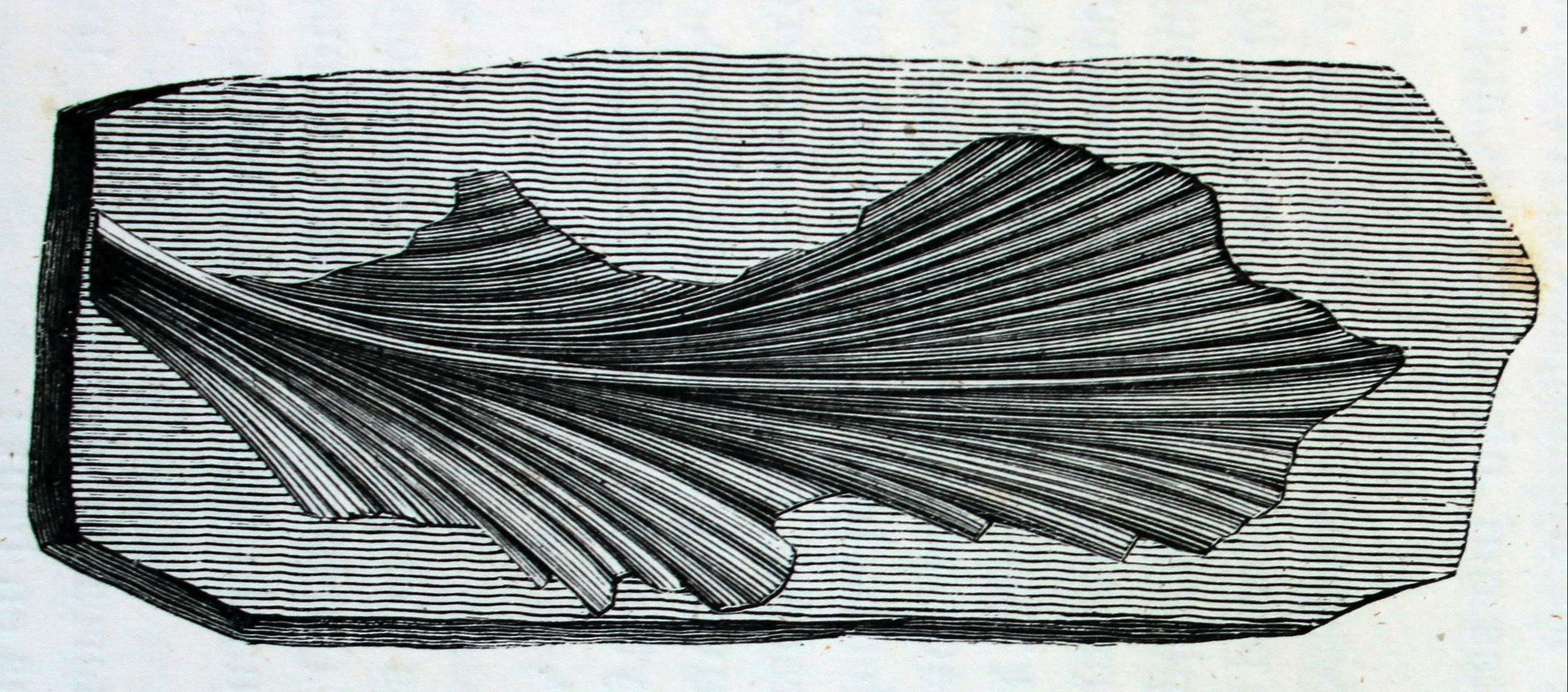
- Illustrations of fossilized foliage of the Carboniferous-Permian plant Noeggerathia
  †Noeggerathia
  - †Noeggerathia gilboensis
- †Nowakia
  - †Nowakia otomari
- †Nucleocrinus
- †Nucleospira
  - †Nucleospira concinna
  - †Nucleospira pisiformis
  - †Nucleospira ventricosa
  - †Nucleospira ventricosta
- Nucula
- Nuculana
- †Nucularca
  - †Nucularca lorrainensis
  - †Nucularca pectunculoides
- †Nuculites
  - †Nuculites lamellata
  - †Nuculites nyassa
  - †Nuculites nyssa
  - †Nuculites oblongatus
  - †Nuculites scitulus
  - †Nuculites triqueter
  - †Nuculites triquiter
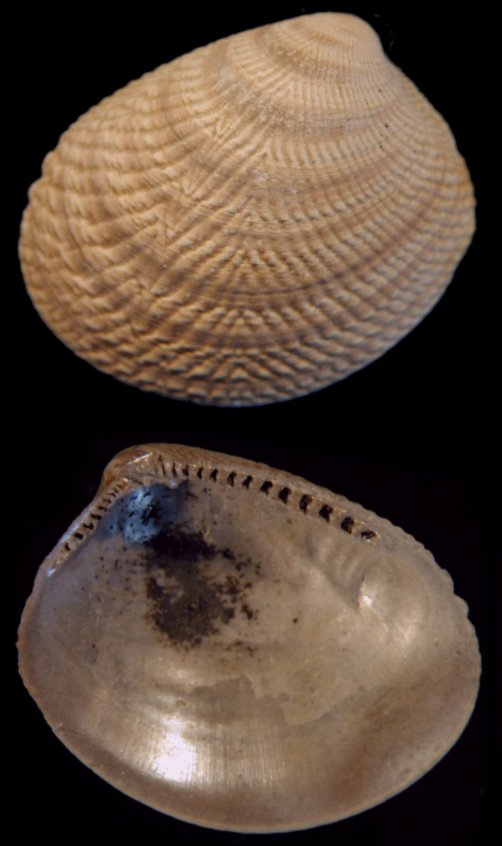
- Nuculoidea
  †Nuculoidea
  - †Nuculoidea corbuliformis
  - †Nuculoidea deceptriformis – type locality for species
  - †Nuculoidea lirata
- †Nyassa
  - †Nyassa arguata
  - †Nyassa arguta
  - †Nyassa dorsata
- †Nybyoceras
  - †Nybyoceras cryptum
- †Nylanderina
  - †Nylanderina goldringae

== O ==
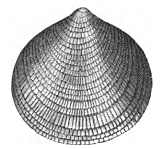
- Illustration of fossils of the Cambrian brachiopod Obolella
  †Obolella
- †Obolus
- †Octonaria
  - †Octonaria bifurcata – type locality for species
- †Odontocephalus
  - †Odontocephalus selenurus
- †Odontochile
  - †Odontochile micrurus
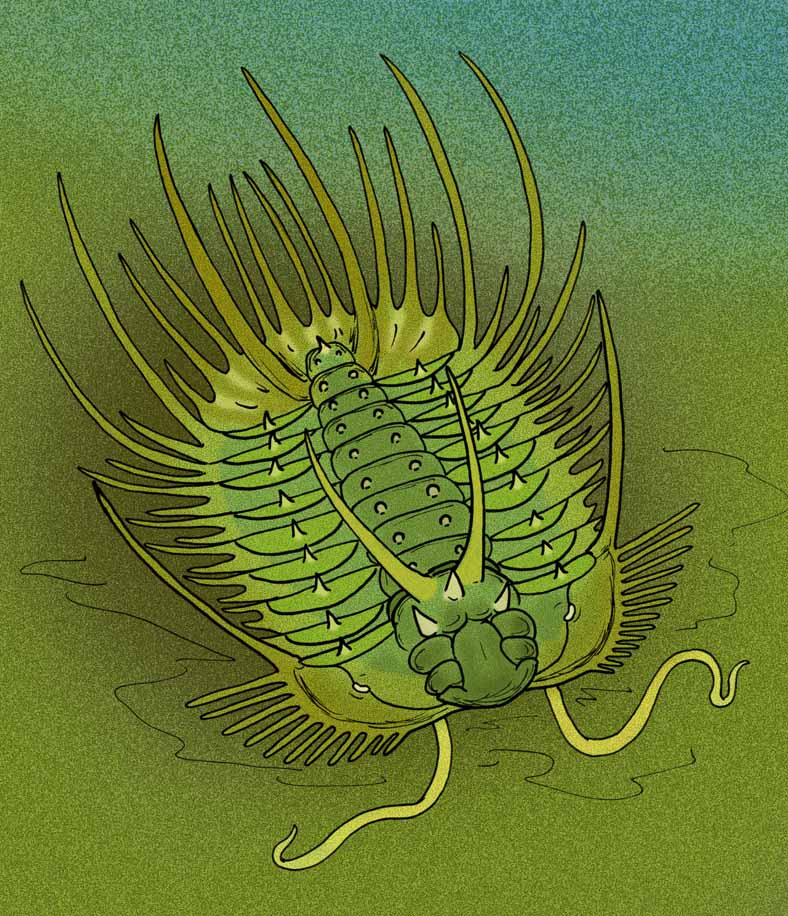
- Restoration of the Late Ordovician-Middle Devonian trilobite Odontopleura
  †Odontopleura
- †Oepikina
- †Oepikodus
  - †Oepikodus communis
- †Oistodus
  - †Oistodus eutyphus
  - †Oistodus venustus
- †Olenellus
- †Olenoides
- †Omospira
  - †Omospira trentonensis
- †Oncoceras
  - †Oncoceras constrictum
  - †Oncoceras pristinum
  - †Oncoceras subrectum
- †Oneotodus – report made of unidentified related form or using admittedly obsolete nomenclature
  - †Oneotodus cavus
- †Onoceras
- †Ontaria
- †Onychoplecia
  - †Onychoplecia longirostris
- †Oonoceras
  - †Oonoceras perkinsi
  - †Oonoceras seelyi
- †Ophileta
  - †Ophileta discus – type locality for species
- †Opsiconidion
  - †Opsiconidion praecursor – or unidentified comparable form
- †Orbiculoidea
  - †Orbiculoidea lodensis
  - †Orbiculoidea lodiensis
  - †Orbiculoidea molina
  - †Orbiculoidea newberryi
  - †Orbiculoidea tenuistriata
  - †Orbiculoidea truncata
  - †Orbiculoidea vanuxemi – or unidentified comparable form
- †Orbignyella
- †Ordogeisonoceras
  - †Ordogeisonoceras amplicameratum
- †Ormoceras
  - †Ormoceras centrale – type locality for species
  - †Ormoceras champlainense – type locality for species
  - †Ormoceras schohariae – type locality for species
- †Orthambonites
  - †Orthambonites acutiplicatus
  - †Orthambonites exfoliata
- †Orthidium
  - †Orthidium lamellosa
  - †Orthidium lamellosum
- †Orthis
  - †Orthis flabellites
  - †Orthis lepidus
  - †Orthis perveta
  - †Orthis praeumbona
  - †Orthis punctostriata
  - †Orthis tenuidens
- †Orthoceras
  - †Orthoceras abruptum
  - †Orthoceras aristides
  - †Orthoceras bassleri
  - †Orthoceras clavatum
  - †Orthoceras lativentrum
  - †Orthoceras lentum
  - †Orthoceras limulurus
  - †Orthoceras luxum
  - †Orthoceras missisquoi
  - †Orthoceras modestum
  - †Orthoceras multicameratum
  - †Orthoceras progressum
  - †Orthoceras rectiannulatum
  - †Orthoceras sayi
  - †Orthoceras vagum
  - †Orthoceras virgulatum
- †Orthodesma
  - †Orthodesma curtum
  - †Orthodesma pulaskiense
- †Orthograptus
  - †Orthograptus pageanus
  - †Orthograptus quadrimucronatus
  - †Orthograptus rivai
  - †Orthograptus ruedemanni
- †Orthonota
  - †Orthonota carinata
  - †Orthonota parvula
  - †Orthonota undulata
- †Orthonychia
  - †Orthonychia concavum
  - †Orthonychia conicum
  - †Orthonychia dentalium
- †Orthospirifer
  - †Orthospirifer mesastrialis
  - †Orthospirifer mesastrialus
  - †Orthospirifer mesatrialis
- †Orthostrophia
  - †Orthostrophia fasciata
- †Orthotetes
- †Otarion
  - †Otarion spinicaudatum
- †Oulodus
  - †Oulodus petila
- †Ovoceras
- †Ozarkina
- †Ozarkodina
  - †Ozarkodina confluens
  - †Ozarkodina hadra
  - †Ozarkodina polinclinata
  - †Ozarkodina sagitta

== P ==
- †Pachecdyceras
  - †Pachecdyceras murale
- †Pachydicta
  - †Pachydicta crassa
- †Pachydictya
  - †Pachydictya acuta
  - †Pachydictya crassa
  - †Pachydictya sheldonensis
- †Pachyphyllum
  - †Pachyphyllum crassicostatum
  - †Pachyphyllum woodmani
- †Pachystrophia – tentative report
- †Pachystylostroma
  - †Pachystylostroma champlainense – type locality for species
  - †Pachystylostroma goodsellense
  - †Pachystylostroma vallum
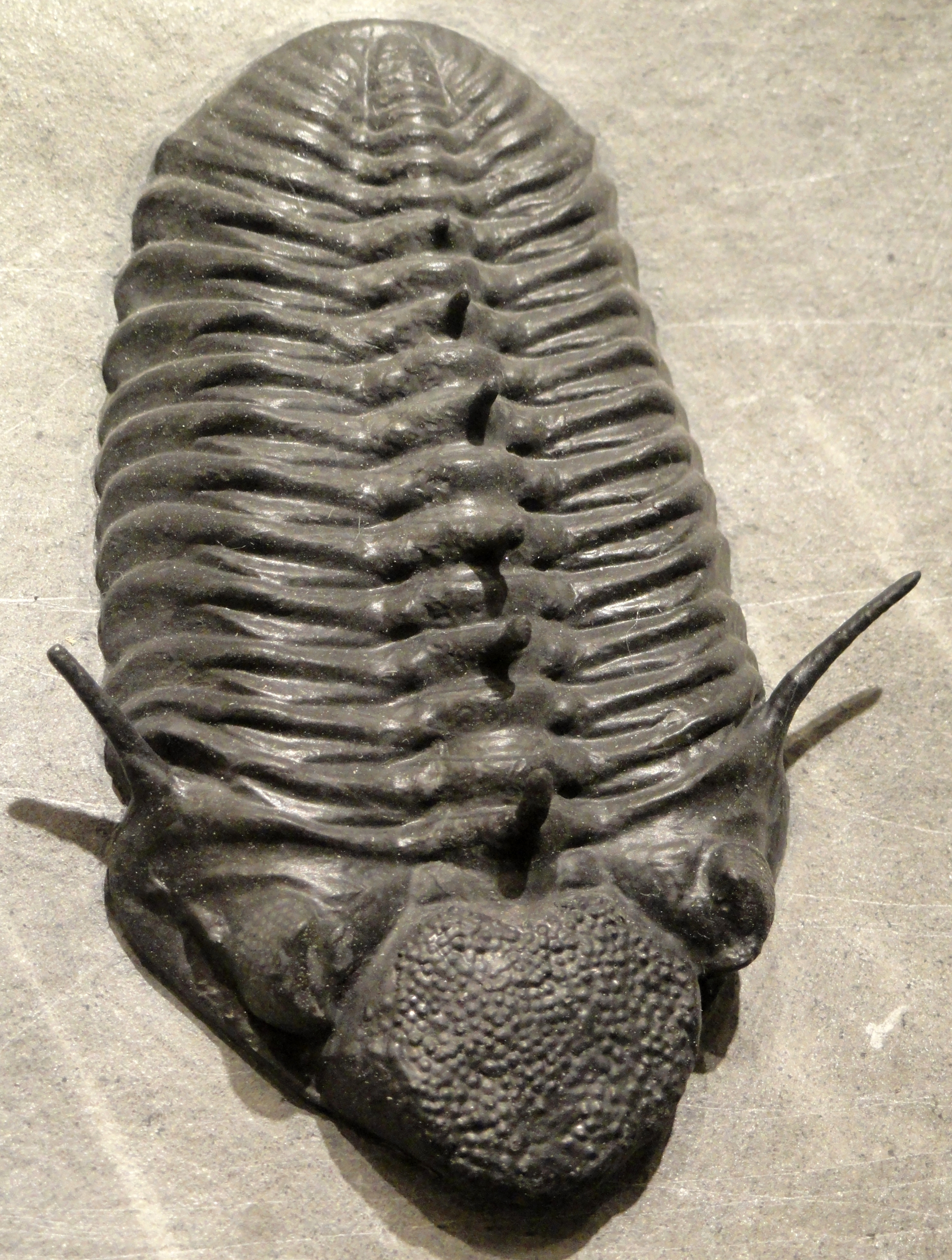
- Fossil of the trilobite Paciphacops
  †Paciphacops
  - †Paciphacops logani
- †Paedeumias
- †Paeeumias
- †Pagetides
  - †Pagetides elagans
- †Pagodia
  - †Pagodia seelyi – type locality for species
- †Palaeacmaea
  - †Palaeacmaea expansa – type locality for species
  - †Palaeacmaea typica
- †Palaeactina
- †Palaeaster
  - †Palaeaster niagarensis
- †Palaeocapulus
  - †Palaeocapulus acutirostre
- †Palaeocaris – tentative report
  - †Palaeocaris cuylerensis – type locality for species
- †Palaeocyclus
  - †Palaeocyclus ratuloides
  - †Palaeocyclus rotuloides
- †Palaeocystites
  - †Palaeocystites tenuiradiatus
- †Palaeodictyota
- †Palaeoglossa
  - †Palaeoglossa belli
  - †Palaeoglossa perovata
- †Palaeoneilo
  - †Palaeoneilo angusta
  - †Palaeoneilo augusta
  - †Palaeoneilo bisulcata
  - †Palaeoneilo brevis
  - †Palaeoneilo congregata
  - †Palaeoneilo constricta
  - †Palaeoneilo contracta
  - †Palaeoneilo crassa
  - †Palaeoneilo elongata
  - †Palaeoneilo emarginata
  - †Palaeoneilo fecunda
  - †Palaeoneilo filosa
  - †Palaeoneilo maxima
  - †Palaeoneilo muta
  - †Palaeoneilo plana
  - †Palaeoneilo rudis
  - †Palaeoneilo tenuistriata
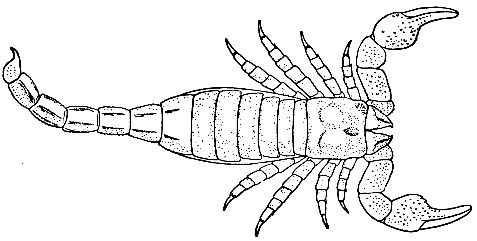
- Life restoration of the Silurian-Devonian scorpion Palaeophonus
  †Palaeophonus
  - †Palaeophonus osborni – type locality for species
- †Palaeophycus
  - †Palaeophycus striatum
- †Palaeophyllum
  - †Palaeophyllum multicaule
- †Palaeopinna
  - †Palaeopinna flabellum
- †Palaeosaccus
- †Palaeosolen
- †Palaeosolon
  - †Palaeosolon siliqui
- †Palaeozygopleura
  - †Palaeozygopleura attenuata
  - †Palaeozygopleura delphicola
  - †Palaeozygopleura hamiltoniae
  - †Palaeozygopleura laxa – type locality for species
  - †Palaeozygopleura multiplicata – type locality for species
  - †Palaeozygopleura noe – type locality for species
  - †Palaeozygopleura sicula
  - †Palaeozygopleura styliola – type locality for species
- †Palaeschara
  - †Palaeschara incrustans
- †Palaozygopleura
  - †Palaozygopleura hamiltoniae
- †Paleoclosterium
  - †Paleoclosterium leptum
- †Paleocystites
  - †Paleocystites tenuiradiatus
- †Paleodictyota
- †Paleodidymoprium
  - †Paleodidymoprium didymum
- †Paleooedogonium
  - †Paleooedogonium micrum
- †Paleophycus
  - †Paleophycus striatum
- †Paleozygopleura
  - †Paleozygopleura delphicola
- †Paleschara
  - †Paleschara radiata
- †Palmatolepis
  - †Palmatolepis triangularis
- †Panderodus
  - †Panderodus panderi – or unidentified comparable form
  - †Panderodus unicostatus
- †Panenka
  - †Panenka hero
  - †Panenka retusa
- †Parabolbina
- †Parabufina
  - †Parabufina convexa
  - †Parabufina subovalis
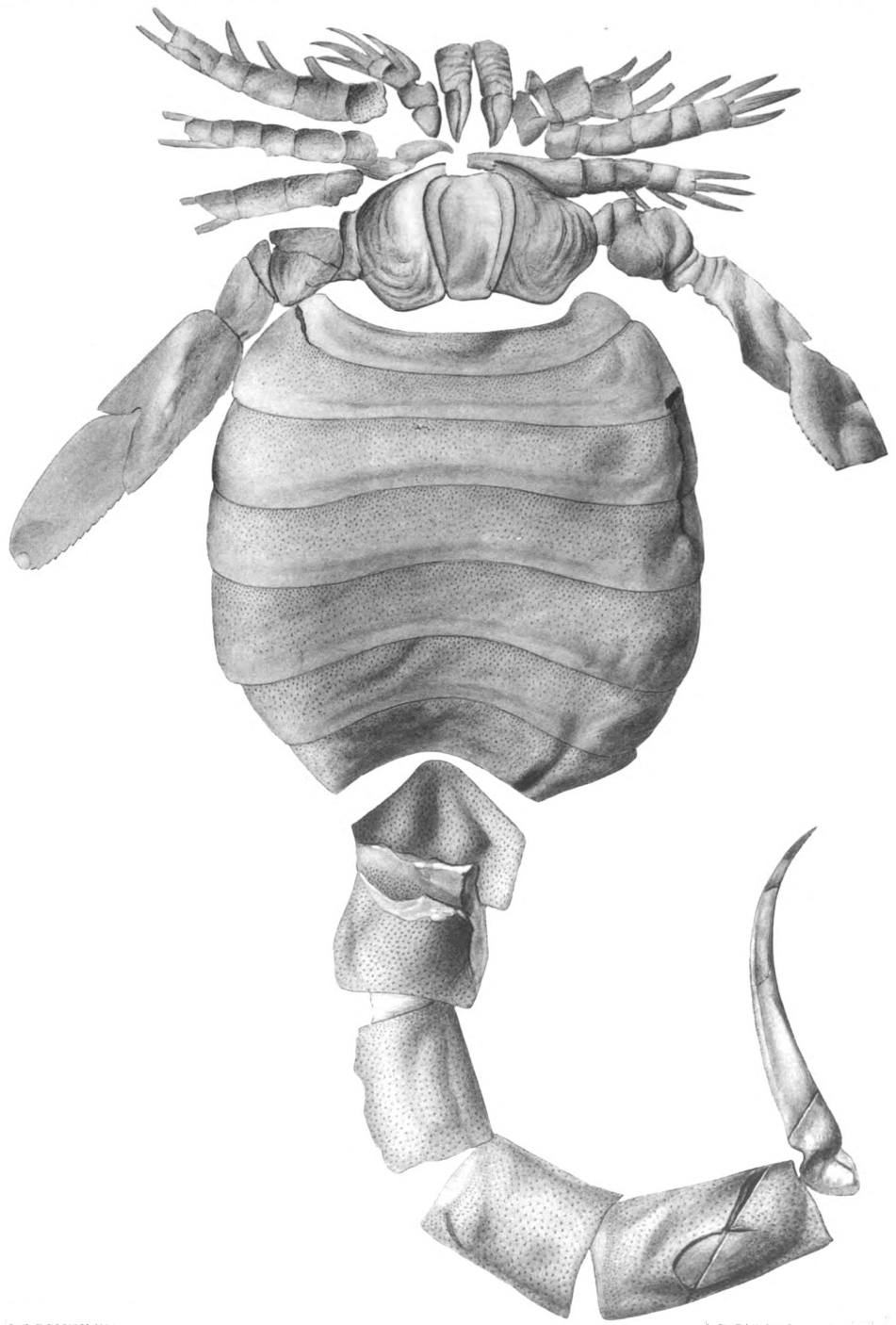
- Fossil of the Silurian-Early Devonian eurypterid ("sea scorpion") Paracarcinosoma
  †Paracarcinosoma
  - †Paracarcinosoma scorpionis
- †Paracardium
  - †Paracardium doris
- †Paraceraurus
  - †Paraceraurus ruedemanni
- †Paracolocrinus
  - †Paracolocrinus paradoxicus
- †Paraconularia
- †Paracyclas
  - †Paracyclas arguta
  - †Paracyclas devoniana
  - †Paracyclas elliptica
  - †Paracyclas lirata
  - †Paracyclas rowleyi
  - †Paracyclas rugosa
  - †Paracyclas tenuis
- †Paradakeoceras
  - †Paradakeoceras minor
  - †Paradakeoceras planiventrum
- †Paraechmina
  - †Paraechmina postica
  - †Paraechmina spinosa
- †Paraendoceras
  - †Paraendoceras depressum – type locality for species
  - †Paraendoceras wappingerense – type locality for species
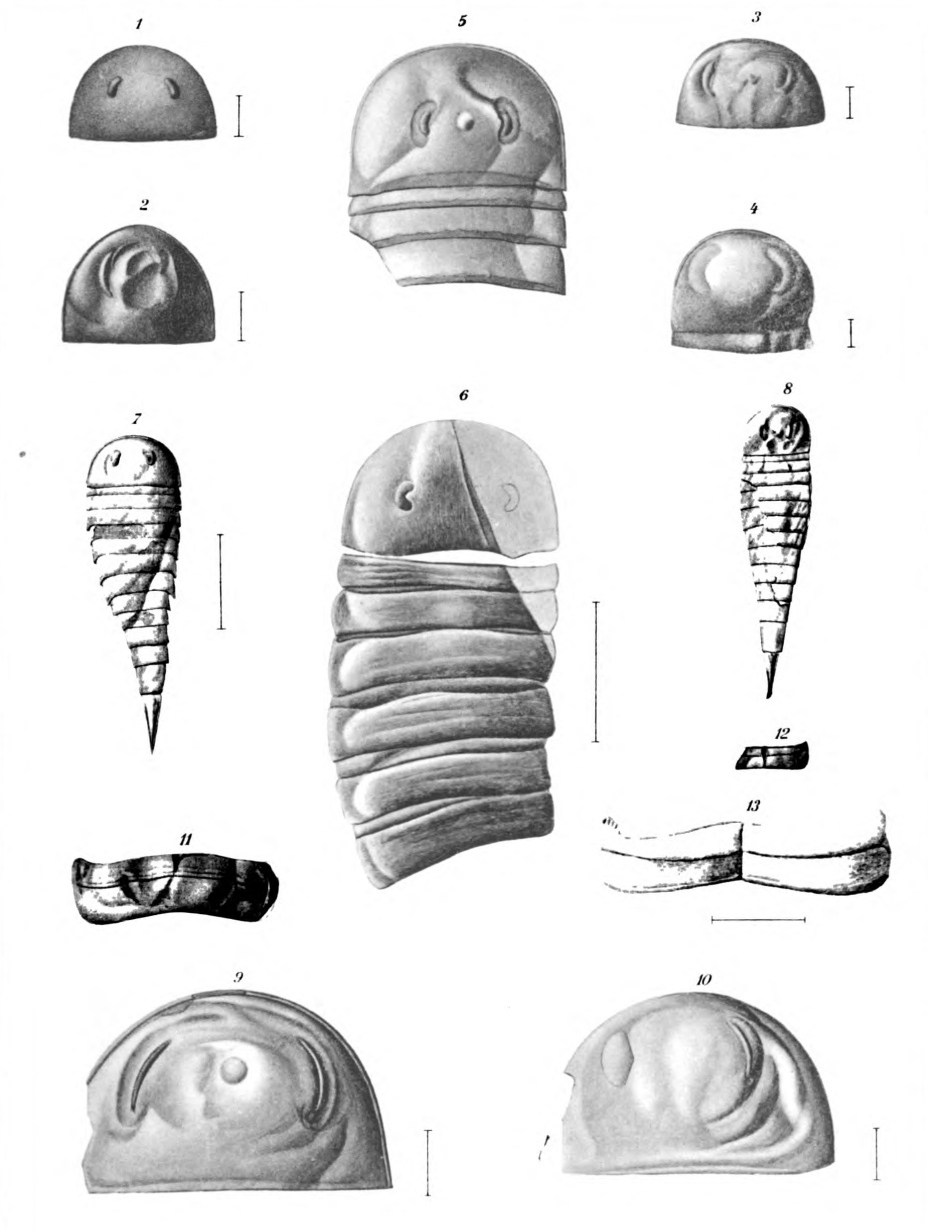
- Fossils of the Silurian-Middle Devonian eurypterid ("sea scorpion") Parahughmilleria
  †Parahughmilleria
  - †Parahughmilleria maria
- †Parallelodon
  - †Parallelodon hamiltoniae
- †Parallelopora
- †Parallelostroma
  - †Parallelostroma foveolatum
  - †Parallelostroma microporum – type locality for species
- †Parapanderodus
  - †Parapanderodus striatus
- †Paraparchites
  - †Paraparchites asymmetrica – type locality for species
- †Paraplethopeltis
  - †Paraplethopeltis carinfera – type locality for species
- †Paraschmidtella
  - †Paraschmidtella paralobata
- †Paraserratodontus
  - †Paraserratodontus costatus
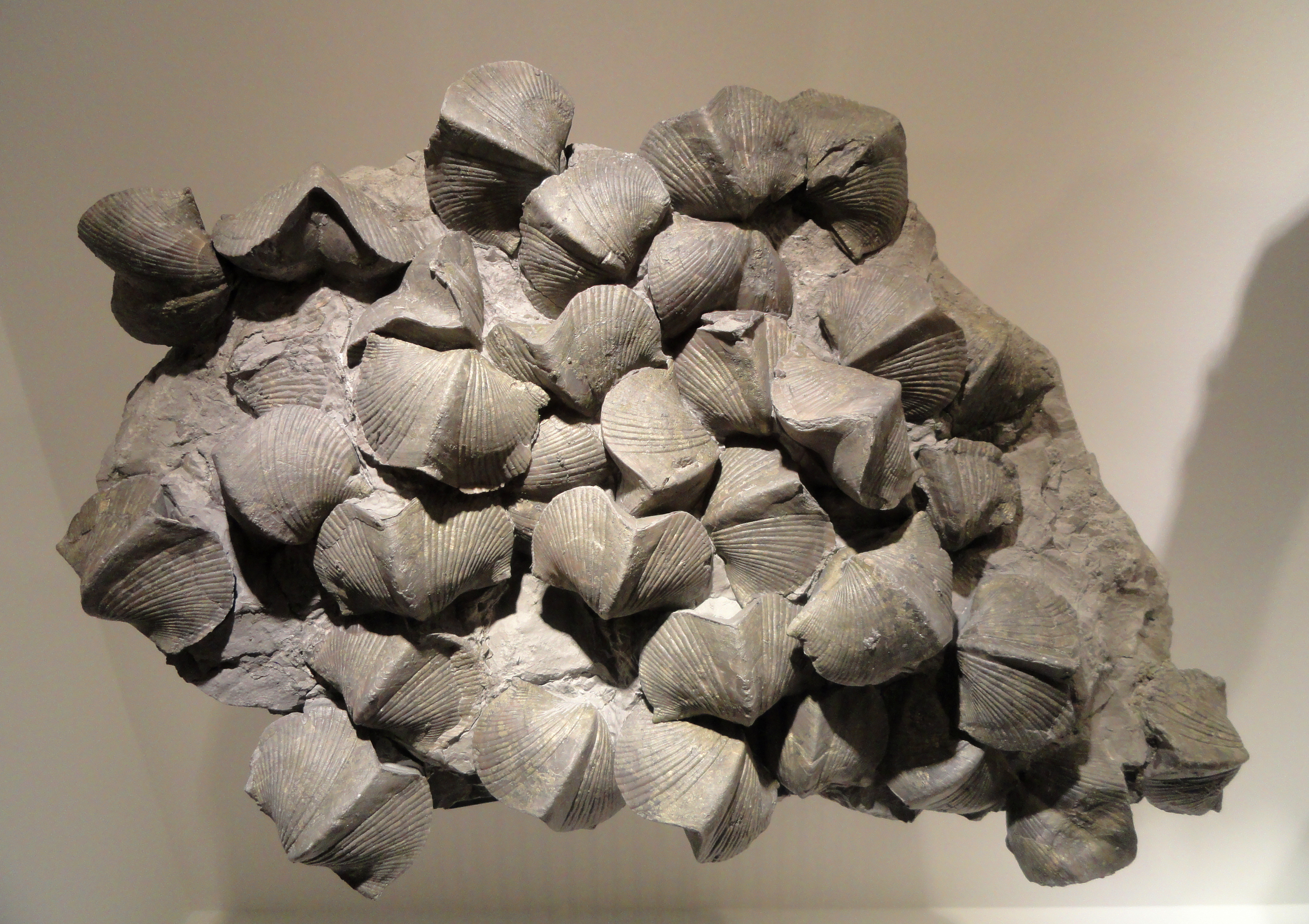
- Assemblage of the Early-Middle Devonian brachiopod Paraspirifer
  †Paraspirifer
  - †Paraspirifer acuminatus
- †Parastrophina
- †Parazyga
  - †Parazyga hirsuta
- †Parodiceras
  - †Parodiceras discoideum
- †Paterula
- †Paucicrura
  - †Paucicrura rogata
- †Paupospira
  - †Paupospira bowdeni
- †Pelagiella
  - †Pelagiella minutissima
  - †Pelagiella primaeva
- †Pentagonia
  - †Pentagonia unisulcata
- †Pentamerella
  - †Pentamerella arata
  - †Pentamerella aruta
  - †Pentamerella pavilionensis
  - †Pentamerella pavillionensis
  - †Pentamerella pericosta
  - †Pentamerella petoskyensis
- †Pentamerus
  - †Pentamerus oblongus
  - †Pentamerus ovalis
- †Periechocrinites
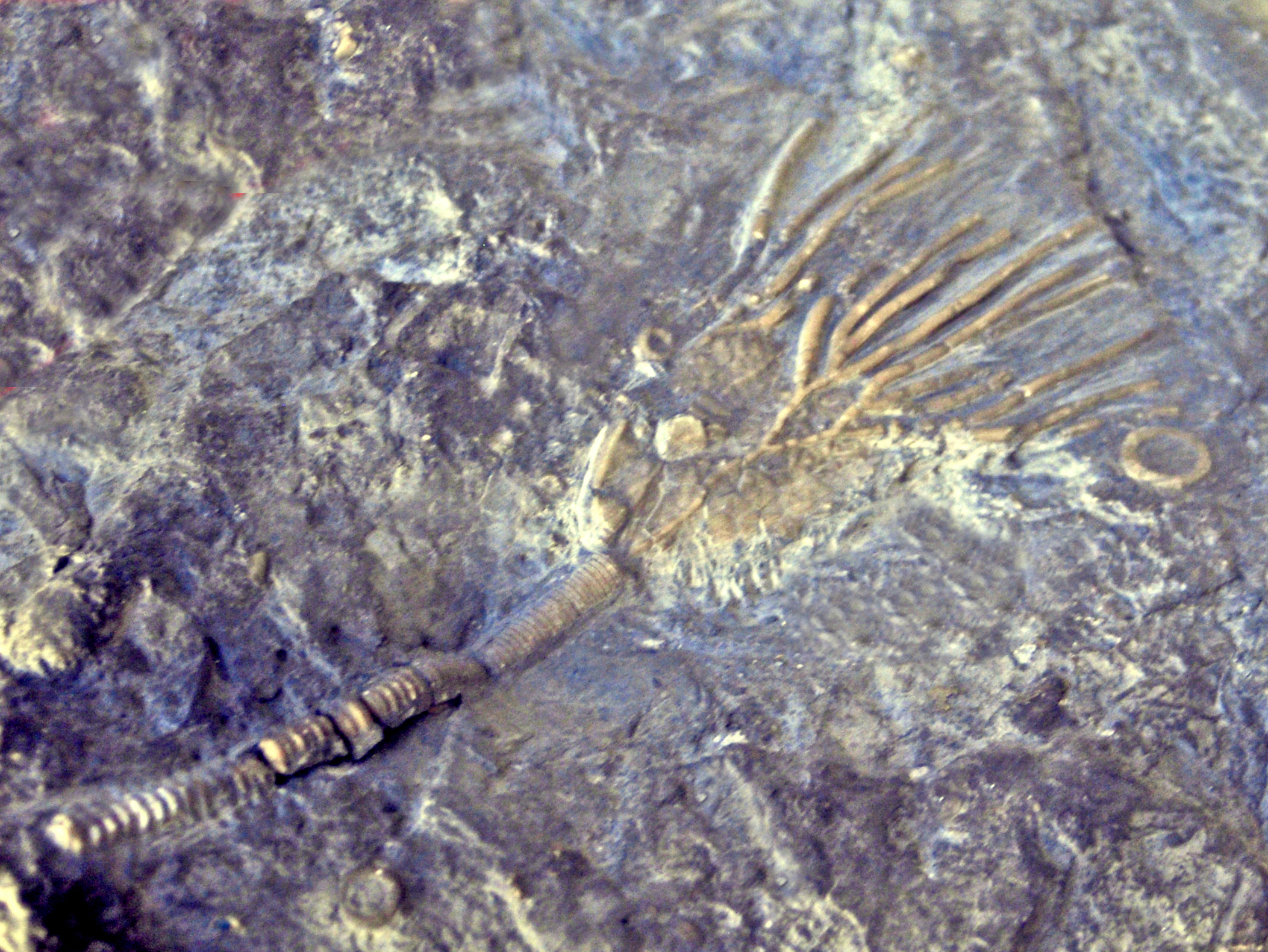
- Fossil of the Silurian-Carboniferous crinoid ("sea lily") Periechocrinus
  †Periechocrinus
  - †Periechocrinus speciosus – or unidentified comparable form
- †Periodon
  - †Periodon grandis
  - †Periodon primum
- †Perissocrinus – type locality for genus
  - †Perissocrinus papillatus – type locality for species
- †Peronopsis
  - †Peronopsis evansi – type locality for species
  - †Peronopsis primigenea – or unidentified comparable form
- †Perotrilites
  - †Perotrilites conatus – or unidentified comparable form
- †Petasotheca – type locality for genus
  - †Petasotheca minuta – type locality for species
- †Petigurus
  - †Petigurus ellipticus – type locality for species
- †Petrocrania
  - †Petrocrania hamiltoniae
  - †Petrocrania prona
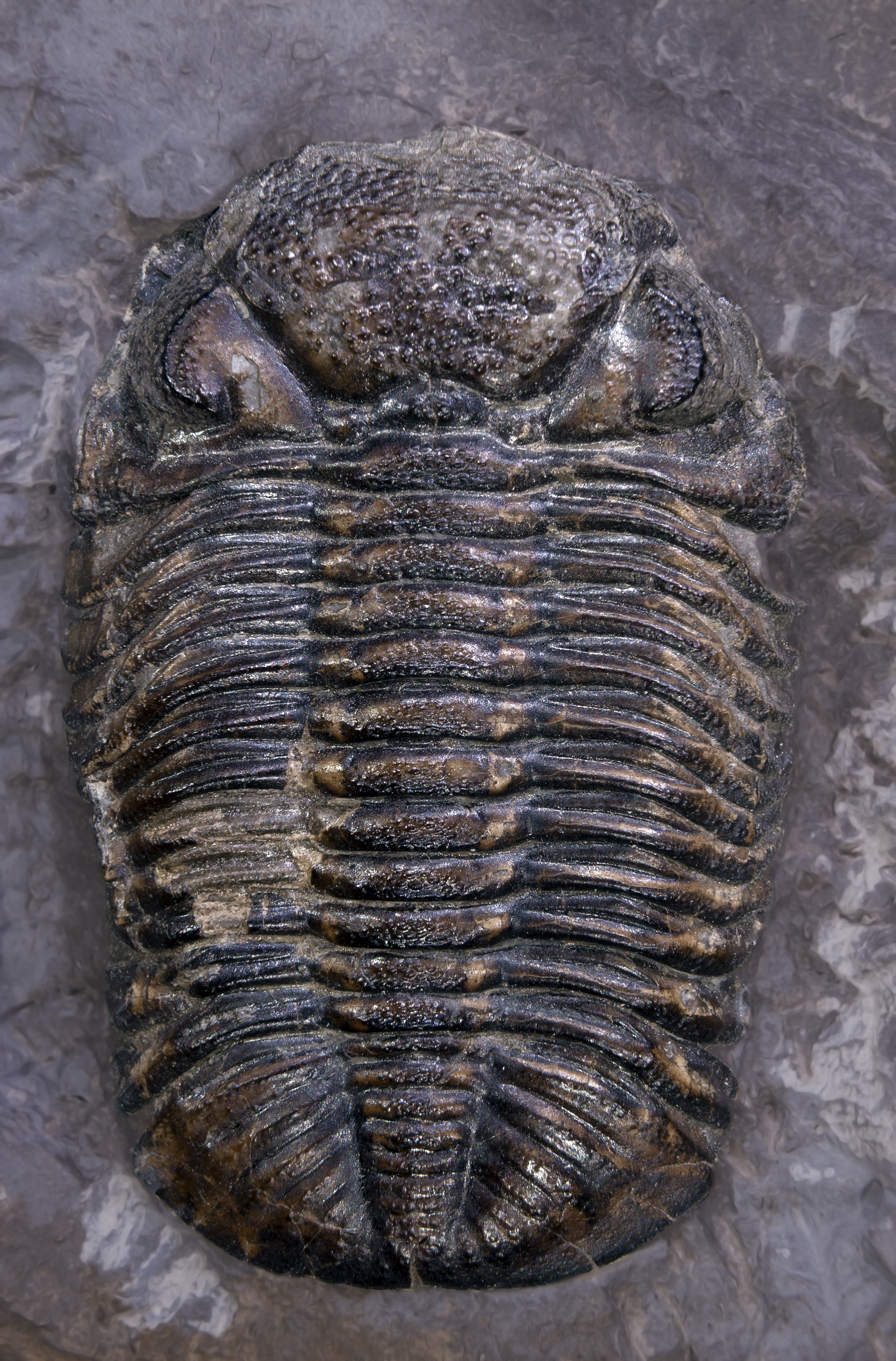
- Fossil of the Devonian trilobite Phacops rana
  †Phacops
  - †Phacops cristata
  - †Phacops triculcatus
  - †Phacops trisulcata
  - †Phacops trisulcatus
- †Phaenopora
  - †Phaenopora clintoni
  - †Phaenopora constellata
  - †Phaenopora ensiformis
  - †Phaenopora explanata
- †Phakelodus
  - †Phakelodus terashimai
- †Phanerotrema
  - †Phanerotrema labrosa – type locality for species
- †Pharciceras
  - †Pharciceras amplexum
- †Phestia
  - †Phestia diversa
  - †Phestia rostellata
- †Philhedra
- †Phipidomella
  - †Phipidomella vanuxemi
- †Phlyctiscapha
  - †Phlyctiscapha subovata
- †Phoenixites
  - †Phoenixites concentricus
- †Pholadella
  - †Pholadella radiata
  - †Pholadella radiatus
- †Pholadomorpha
  - †Pholadomorpha pholadiformis
- †Pholidops
  - †Pholidops linguloides
  - †Pholidops squamiformis
  - †Pholidops squammiformis
- †Pholidostrophia
  - †Pholidostrophia nacrea
  - †Pholidostrophia ovata
- †Phorocephala
  - †Phorocephala setoni
- †Phragmoceras
- †Phragmodus
  - †Phragmodus undatus
- †Phragmolites
  - †Phragmolites compressus
- †Phragmosphaera – type locality for genus
  - †Phragmosphaera incisus
  - †Phragmosphaera lyra – type locality for species
  - †Phragmosphaera natator
  - †Phragmosphaera triliratus – or unidentified comparable form
- †Phthonia
  - †Phthonia cylindrica
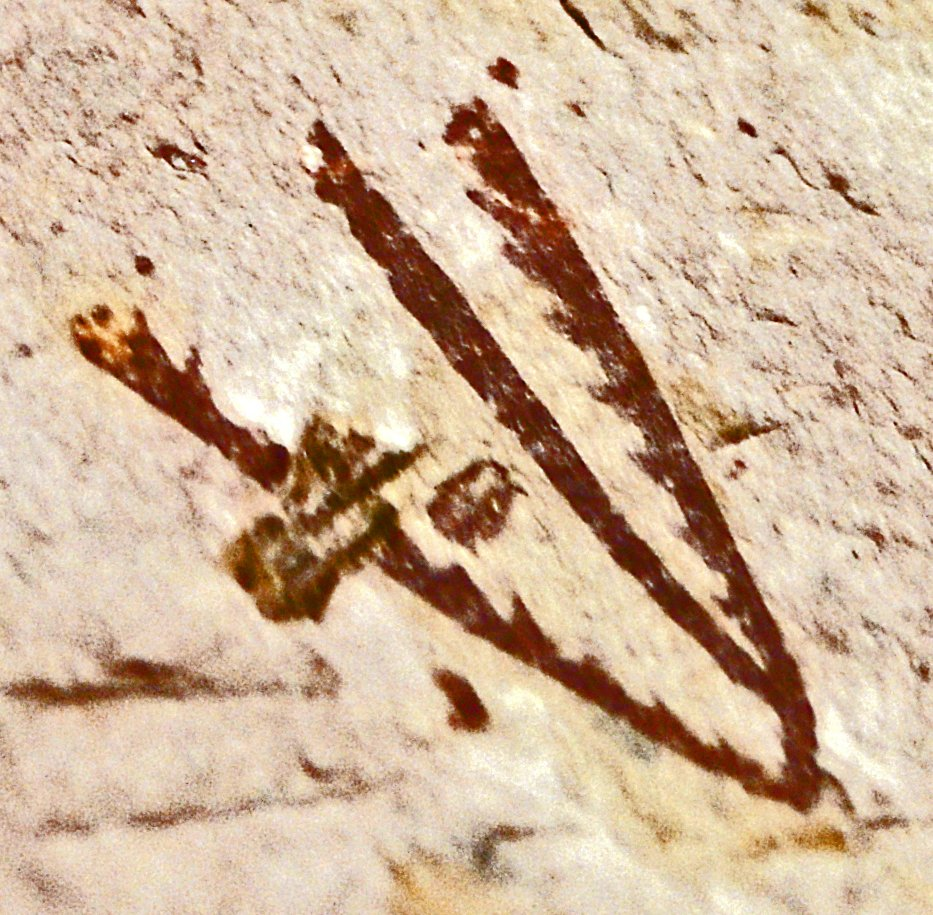
- Fossil of the Early Ordovician graptolite Phyllograptus
  †Phyllograptus
- †Phylloporina
  - †Phylloporina asperatastriata
  - †Phylloporina asperatostriata
  - †Phylloporina asperostriata
  - †Phylloporina incepta
- †Physemataspis
  - †Physemataspis insularis
- †Pionoceras
  - †Pionoceras pomponium
  - †Pionoceras vokesi
- †Pionodema
- †Pisocrinus
- †Pittsfordipterus
  - †Pittsfordipterus phelpsae
- †Placentella
  - †Placentella elliptica – or unidentified comparable form
- †Placoblastus
  - †Placoblastus lucina
- †Plaesiomys
  - †Plaesiomys iphigenia
  - †Plaesiomys strophomenoides
- †Platillaenus
  - †Platillaenus erastusi
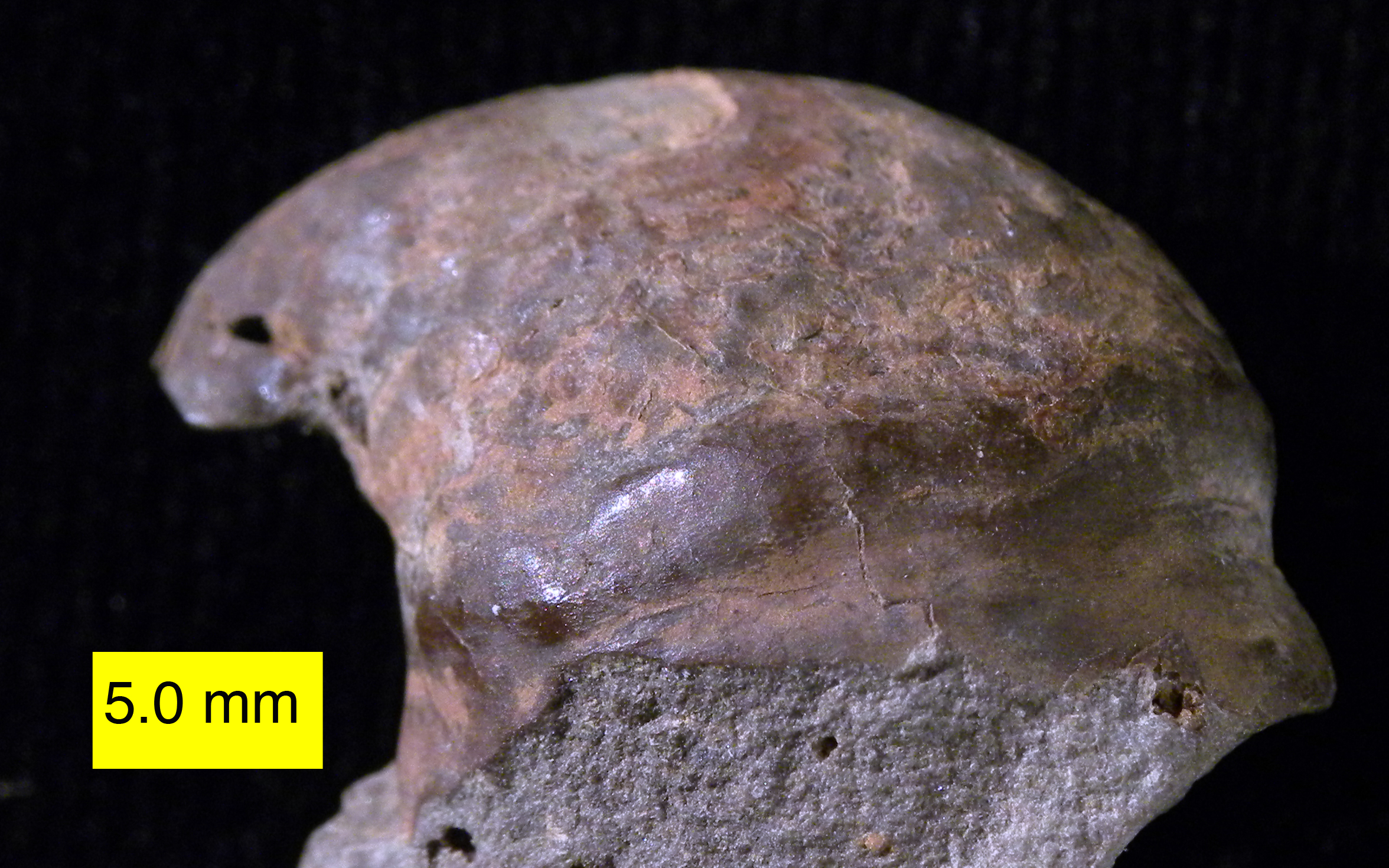
- Fossilized shell of the Silurian-Early Triassic sea snail Platyceras
  †Platyceras
  - †Platyceras angulatum
  - †Platyceras argo
  - †Platyceras carinatum
  - †Platyceras desmatum
  - †Platyceras erectum
  - †Platyceras gebhardi
  - †Platyceras hemisphericum
  - †Platyceras lineata
  - †Platyceras lineatum
  - †Platyceras niagarense
  - †Platyceras niagarensis
  - †Platyceras rarispinum
  - †Platyceras reflexum
  - †Platyceras rictum
  - †Platyceras turbinata
  - †Platyceras unisulcata
  - †Platyceras ventricosum
  - †Platyceras ventricosus
- †Platyorthis
  - †Platyorthis planoconvexa
- †Platyrachella
- †Platyrochella
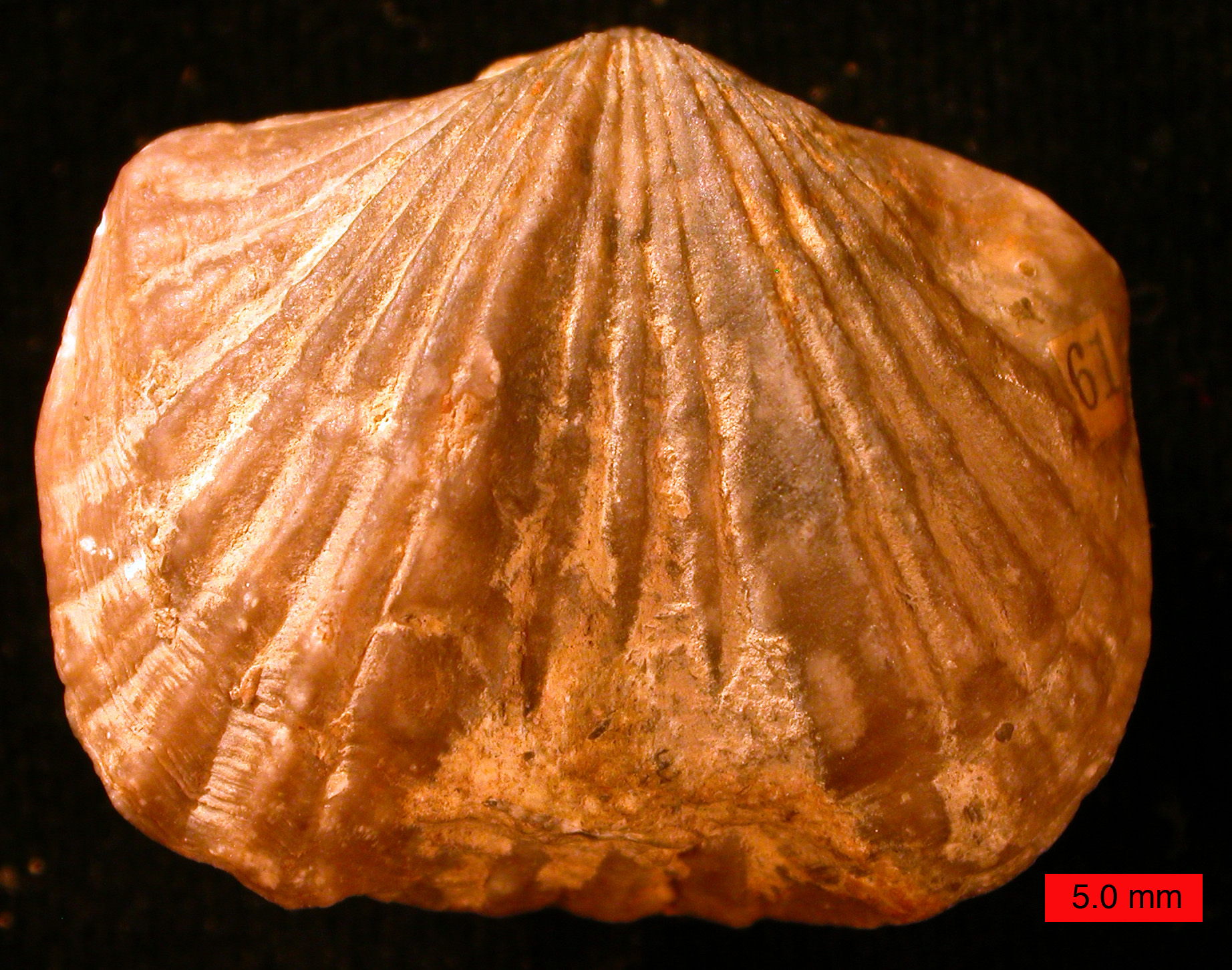
- Fossilized shell of the Middle Ordovician-Silurian brachiopod Platystrophia
  †Platystrophia
  - †Platystrophia biforata
  - †Platystrophia biforatus
  - †Platystrophia longicardinalis
  - †Platystrophia lynx
  - †Platystrophia robusta
- †Playfordites
  - †Playfordites tripartitus – or unidentified comparable form
- †Plectambonites
- †Plectatrypa
  - †Plectatrypa nodostriata
- †Plectoceras
  - †Plectoceras jason
  - †Plectoceras jasoni
- †Plectodina
- †Plectodonta
- †Plectonotus
  - †Plectonotus boucoti
  - †Plectonotus trilobita
- †Plectorthis
  - †Plectorthis exfoliata
- †Plectostroma
  - †Plectostroma micum
- †Plethobolbina
  - †Plethobolbina typicalis
- †Plethopeltis
  - †Plethopeltis obtusus
- †Plethorhyncha
- †Plethorhynchia
- †Plethorthis
- †Plethospira
  - †Plethospira cassina – type locality for species
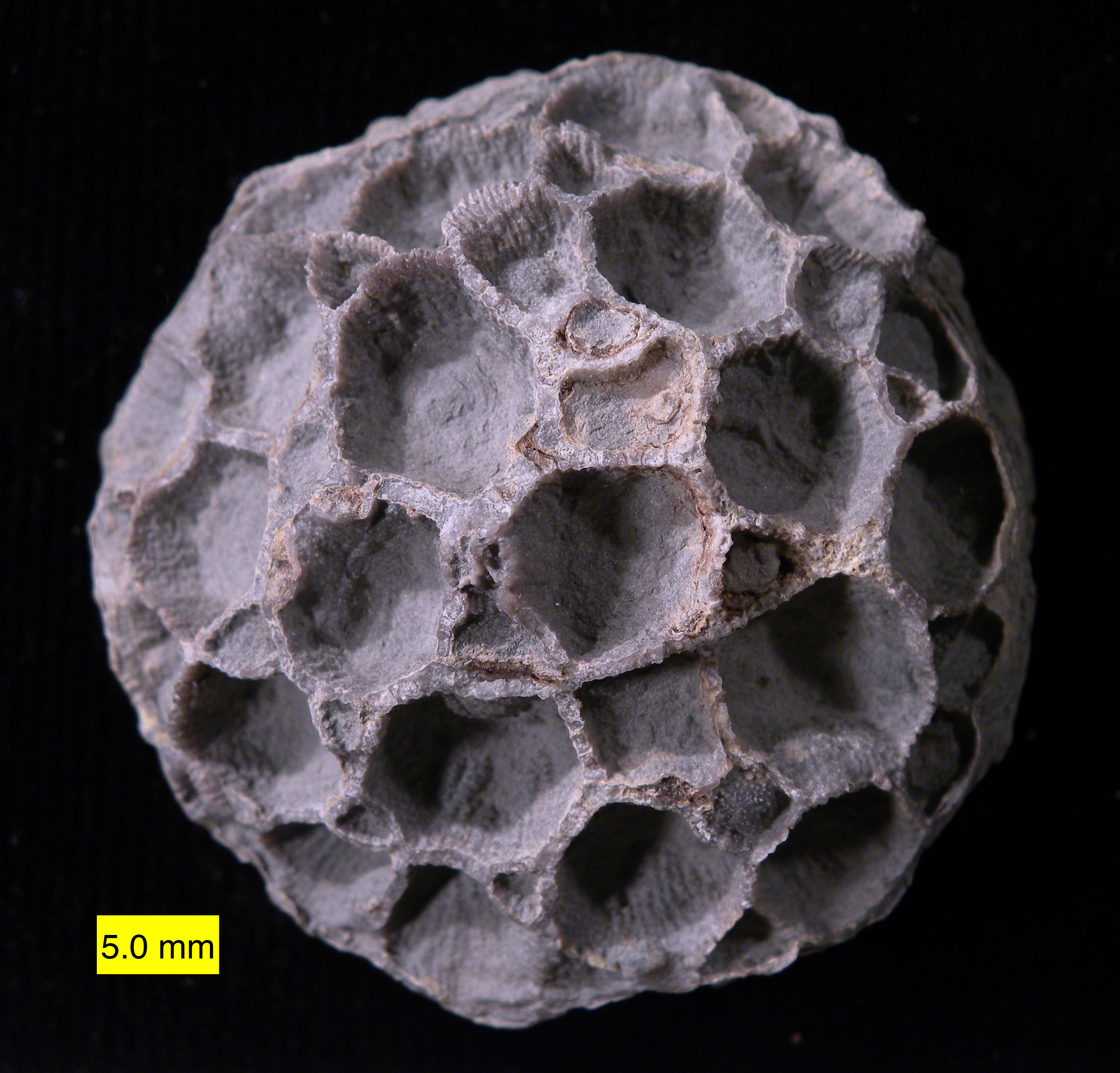
- Fossil of the Silurian-Carboniferous tabulate coral Pleurodictyum
  †Pleurodictyum
  - †Pleurodictyum americanum
  - †Pleurodictyum convexa
  - †Pleurodictyum convexum
  - †Pleurodictyum cylindricum
  - †Pleurodictyum cylindricus
  - †Pleurodictyum dividua
  - †Pleurodictyum stylopora
- †Pleuronotus
  - †Pleuronotus decewi
  - †Pleuronotus tioga – type locality for species
- †Pleurorima
  - †Pleurorima kayseri – type locality for species
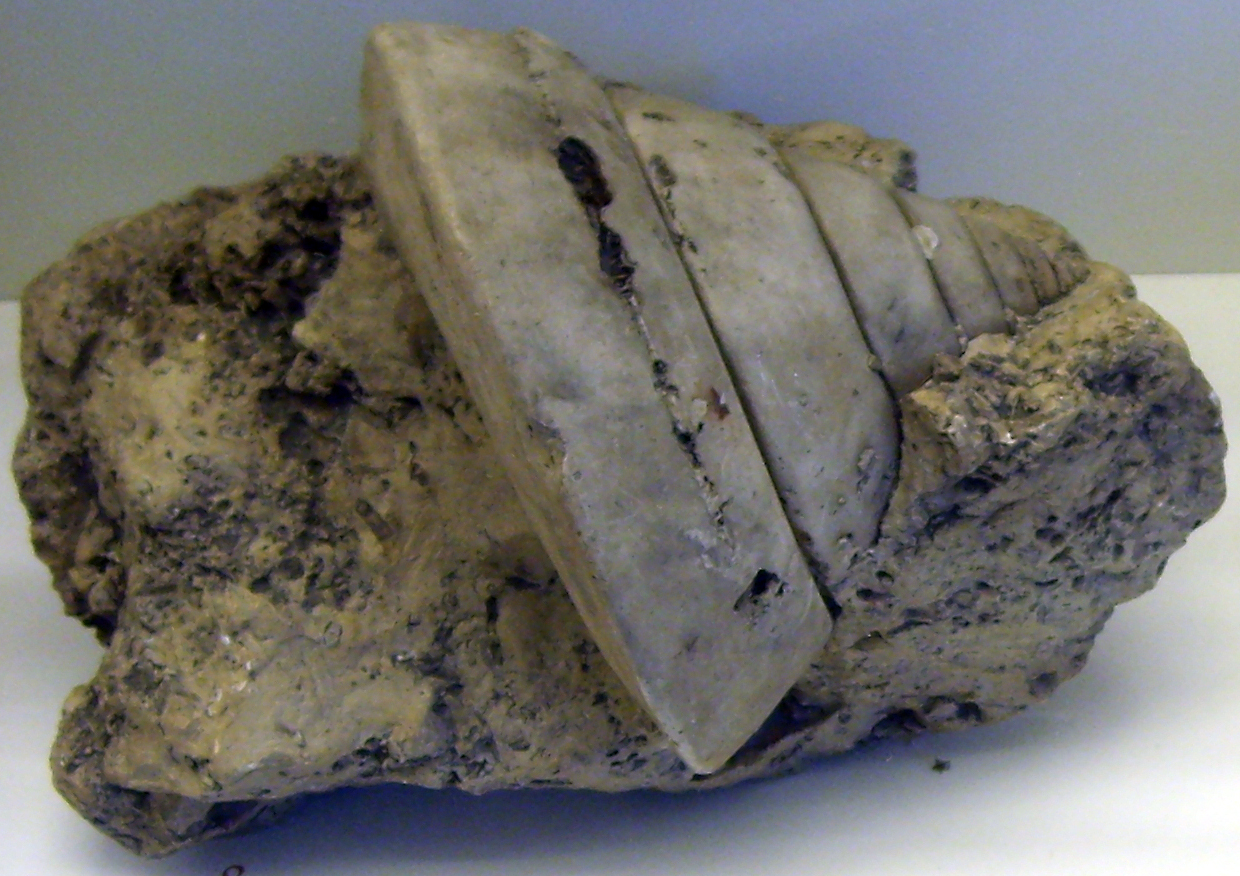
- Fossilized shell of a Pleurotomaria slit snail
  Pleurotomaria
  - †Pleurotomaria apicialis – type locality for species
- †Plicanoplia
- †Plicoplasia
- †Plinthokonion – tentative report
  - †Plinthokonion psamminon – type locality for species
- †Pliomerops
  - †Pliomerops canadensis
- †Plumalina
- †Podolella
- †Pojetaconcha
  - †Pojetaconcha beecheri
- †Pojetaia
  - †Pojetaia runnegari
- †Poleumita
  - †Poleumita crenulata
  - †Poleumita vernonensis – type locality for species
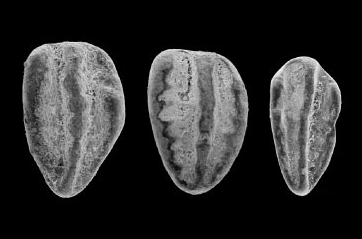
- Various conodont elements of Polygnathus
  †Polygnathus
- †Polygyrata
  - †Polygyrata hunterensis – type locality for species
- †Polyplacognathus
  - †Polyplacognathus ramosa
- †Polyplectella
  - †Polyplectella mira
- †Polypora
  - †Polypora incepta
- †Ponderodictya
  - †Ponderodictya punctulifera
- †Ponticeras
  - †Ponticeras perlatum
- †Pontobdellopsis
- †Poteriocrinus
  - †Poteriocrinus dignatus
- †Praecardium
- †Praematuratropis – type locality for genus
  - †Praematuratropis ovatus – type locality for species
- †Praewaagenoconcha
  - †Praewaagenoconcha speciosa
- †Prasopora
  - †Prasopora lenticularis
  - †Prasopora sardesoni
  - †Prasopora similatrix
  - †Prasopora simulatrix
- †Primaspis
  - †Primaspis crosotus
  - †Primaspis trentonensis
- †Primitia
- †Primitiella
  - †Primitiella unicornis
- †Primitiopsis
  - †Primitiopsis punctulifera
- †Prionothyris
  - †Prionothyris diobolaris
- †Prismostylus
  - †Prismostylus fibratum
- †Pristeroceras
  - †Pristeroceras timidum
- †Probeloceras
  - †Probeloceras lutheri
- †Probillingsites
  - †Probillingsites inflatus – type locality for species
- †Prochorites
  - †Prochorites alveolatus
- †Productella
  - †Productella arctirostrata
  - †Productella belanskii
  - †Productella boydii
  - †Productella callawayensis
  - †Productella dumosa
  - †Productella navicella
  - †Productella nevicella
  - †Productella perplana
  - †Productella rectispina
  - †Productella speciosa
  - †Productella spinulocosta
- †Proendoceras
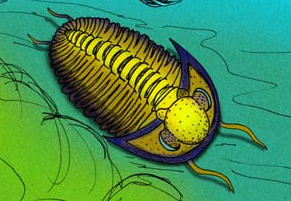
- Restoration of the Silurian trilobite Proetus
  †Proetus
  - †Proetus clarus
  - †Proetus corycocus
  - †Proetus corycoeus
  - †Proetus haldemani
  - †Proetus stokesi
- †Prolixocrinus
  - †Prolixocrinus nodocaudis
- †Promourlonia
  - †Promourlonia durhamensis
- †Proplina
  - †Proplina cornutaformis
- †Propora
- †Prosaukia
  - †Prosaukia spinula
- †Proscorpius – type locality for genus
  - †Proscorpius osborni – type locality for species
- †Prosopeionum
  - †Prosopeionum plexum – type locality for species
- †Prosseria
  - †Prosseria grandis
- †Protaster
  - †Protaster stellifer
- †Protaxocrinus
  - †Protaxocrinus annellus
- †Proteoceras
  - †Proteoceras moniliforme
  - †Proteoceras perkinsi
- †Proteokalon
  - †Proteokalon petryi
- †Proterocameroceras
  - †Proterocameroceras brainerdi
- †Prothyris
  - †Prothyris lanceolata
- †Protocalyptraea – type locality for genus
  - †Protocalyptraea marshalli – type locality for species
  - †Protocalyptraea styliophila – type locality for species
- †Protochthonius – type locality for genus
  - †Protochthonius gilboa – type locality for species
- †Protocrisina
- †Protocycloceras
  - †Protocycloceras catulus
  - †Protocycloceras furtivum
  - †Protocycloceras lamarcki
  - †Protocycloceras xerxes
- †Protodouvillina
  - †Protodouvillina inequistrata
  - †Protodouvillina inequistriata
- †Protokionoceras
- †Protolepidodendron
  - †Protolepidodendron gilboense
  - †Protolepidodendron scharianum
- †Protoleptostrophia
  - †Protoleptostrophia concava
  - †Protoleptostrophia lirella
  - †Protoleptostrophia perplana
- †Protomegastrophia
- †Protopanderodus
- †Protoscolex
- †Protozyga
- †Proturritella
  - †Proturritella historicum
- †Protypus
- †Pseudaviculopecten
  - †Pseudaviculopecten fasciculatus
  - †Pseudaviculopecten princeps
- †Pseudoatrypa
  - †Pseudoatrypa devoniana
  - †Pseudoatrypa entilformis
- †Pseudoatrypta
  - †Pseudoatrypta devoniana – or unidentified comparable form
- †Pseudoblothrophyllum
  - †Pseudoblothrophyllum arrectum
  - †Pseudoblothrophyllum helderbergicum
  - †Pseudoblothrophyllum helderbergium
  - †Pseudoblothrophyllum munnsvillium
- †Pseudohornea
  - †Pseudohornea diffusa
- †Pseudohornera
  - †Pseudohornera diffusa
- †Pseudohydnoceras
  - †Pseudohydnoceras erraticum
- †Pseudolingula
  - †Pseudolingula rectilateralis
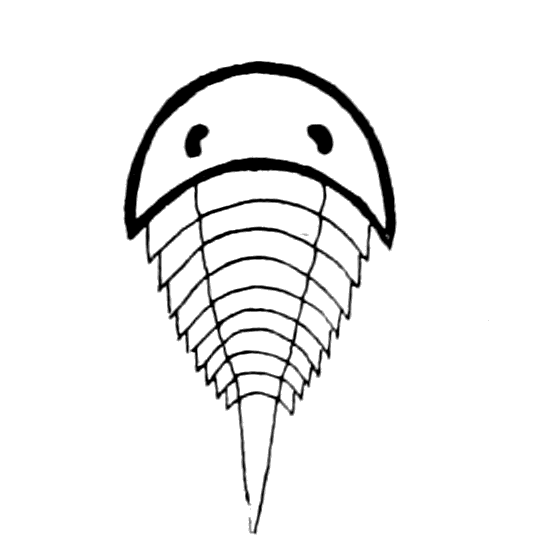
- Illustration of a fossil of the Silurian arthropod Pseudoniscus
  †Pseudoniscus
- †Pseudooneotodus
  - †Pseudooneotodus bicornis
- †Pseudoplagiothyra
  - †Pseudoplagiothyra praecursor
- †Pseudosphaerexochus
  - †Pseudosphaerexochus approximus
  - †Pseudosphaerexochus satyrus
  - †Pseudosphaerexochus vulcanus
- †Pseudosporochnus
- †Pseudostictoporella
- †Pseudostylodictyon
  - †Pseudostylodictyon lamottense
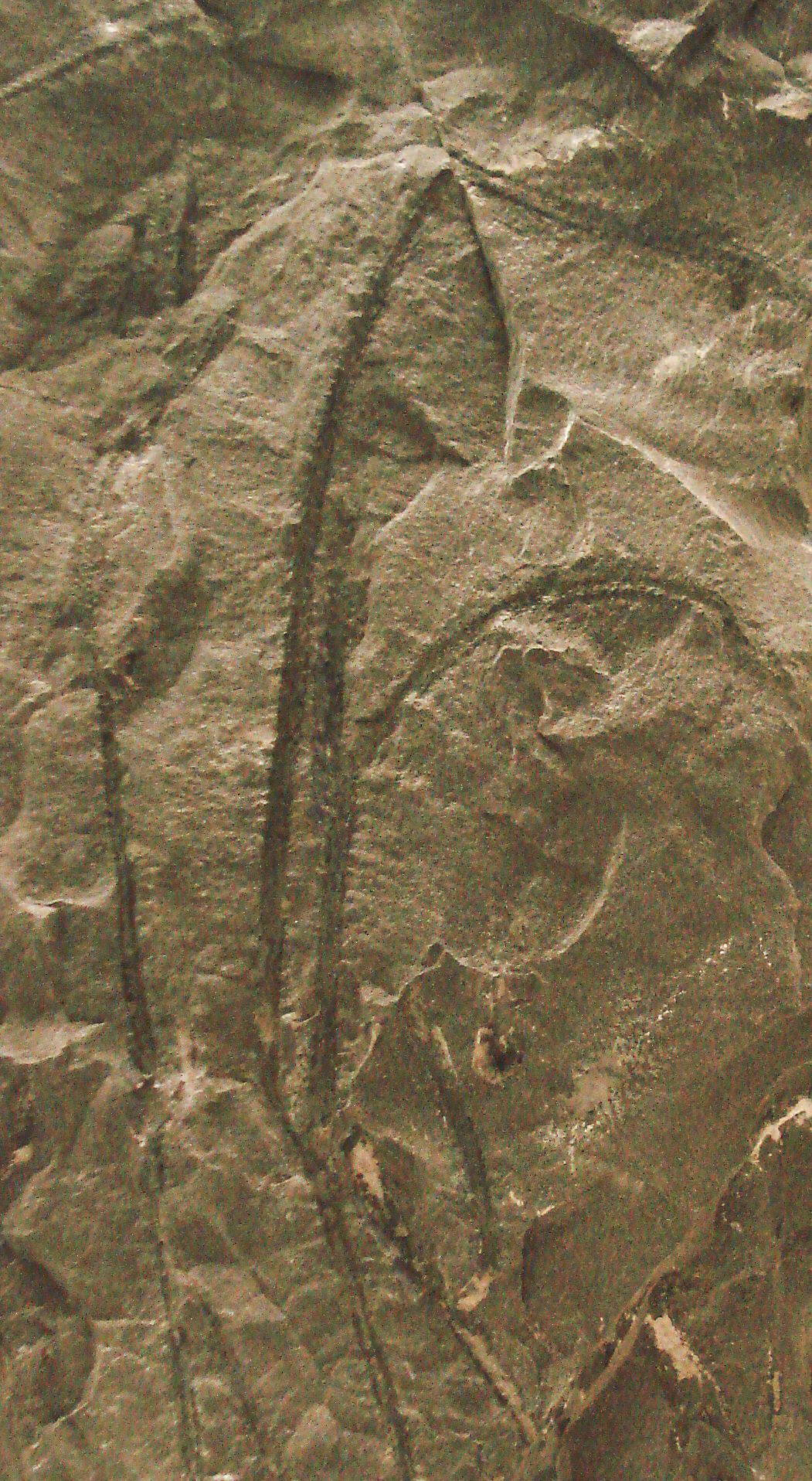
- Fossil of the primitive Devonian vascular plant Psilophyton
  †Psilophyton
  - †Psilophyton grandis
- †Pteracontiodus
  - †Pteracontiodus bransoni
- †Pterina
  - †Pterina demissa
- †Pterinea
  - †Pterinea emacerata
  - †Pterinea insueta
  - †Pterinea jordani – or unidentified comparable form
  - †Pterinea waylandsmithi – type locality for species
- †Pterinopectan
  - †Pterinopectan undosus
  - †Pterinopectan vertumnus
- †Pterinopecten
  - †Pterinopecten erectus
  - †Pterinopecten hermes
  - †Pterinopecten suborbicularis
  - †Pterinopecten vertumnus
- †Pteriochaenia
  - †Pteriochaenia fragilis
- †Pterochaenia
  - †Pterochaenia fragilis
- †Pterospathodus
  - †Pterospathodus amorphognathoides
- †Pterotheca
  - †Pterotheca expansa
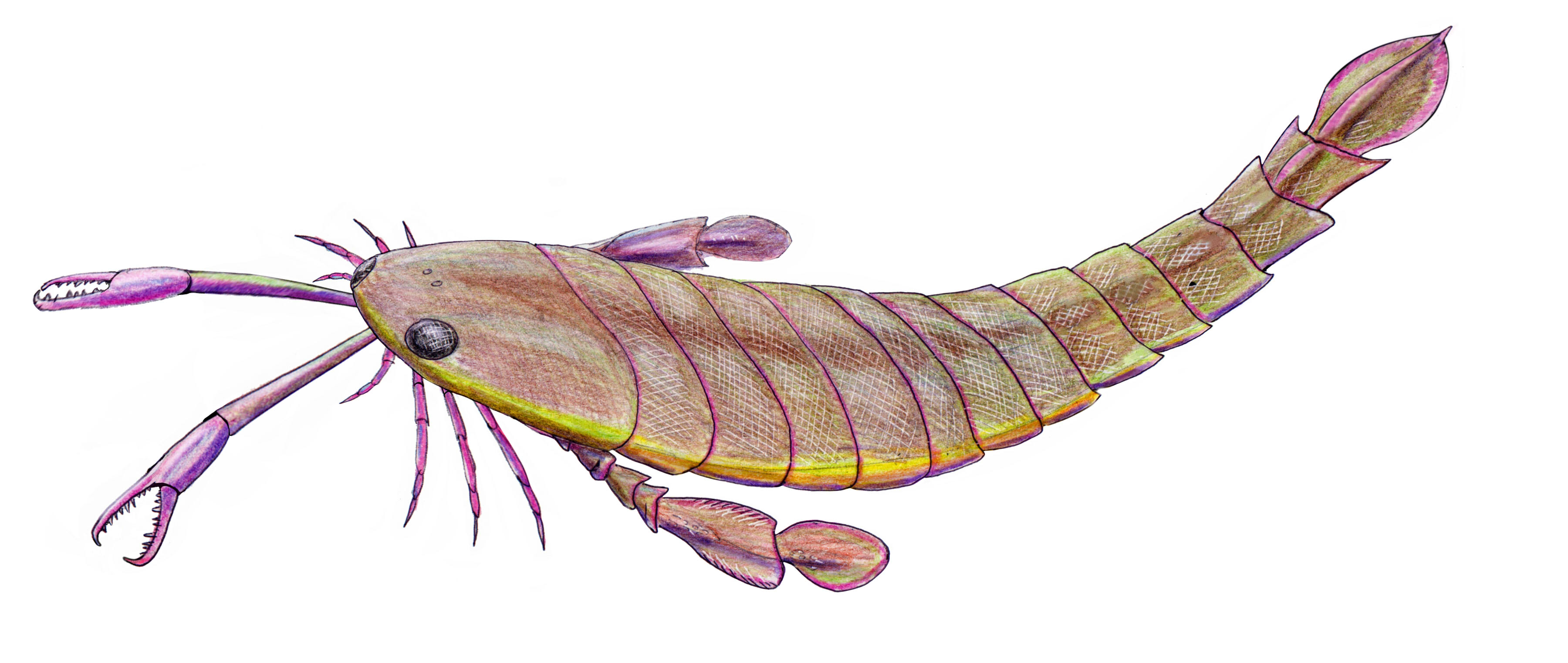
- Restoration of the Silurian-Middle Devonian eurypterid ("sea scorpion") Pterygotus
  †Pterygotus
  - †Pterygotus cobbi
  - †Pterygotus juvensis
  - †Pterygotus monroensis
- †Ptilodictya
  - †Ptilodictya plumea
- †Ptilograptus
- †Ptilonaster
  - †Ptilonaster princeps
- †Ptiloporella
- †Ptomatis
  - †Ptomatis patulus – type locality for species
  - †Ptomatis rudis
- †Ptychagnostus
  - †Ptychagnostus elegans
  - †Ptychagnostus punctuosus
- †Ptychaspis
  - †Ptychaspis speciosus
- †Ptychocrinus
  - †Ptychocrinus medinensis
- †Ptychodesma
  - †Ptychodesma knappianum
- †Ptychomphalina
  - †Ptychomphalina lucina
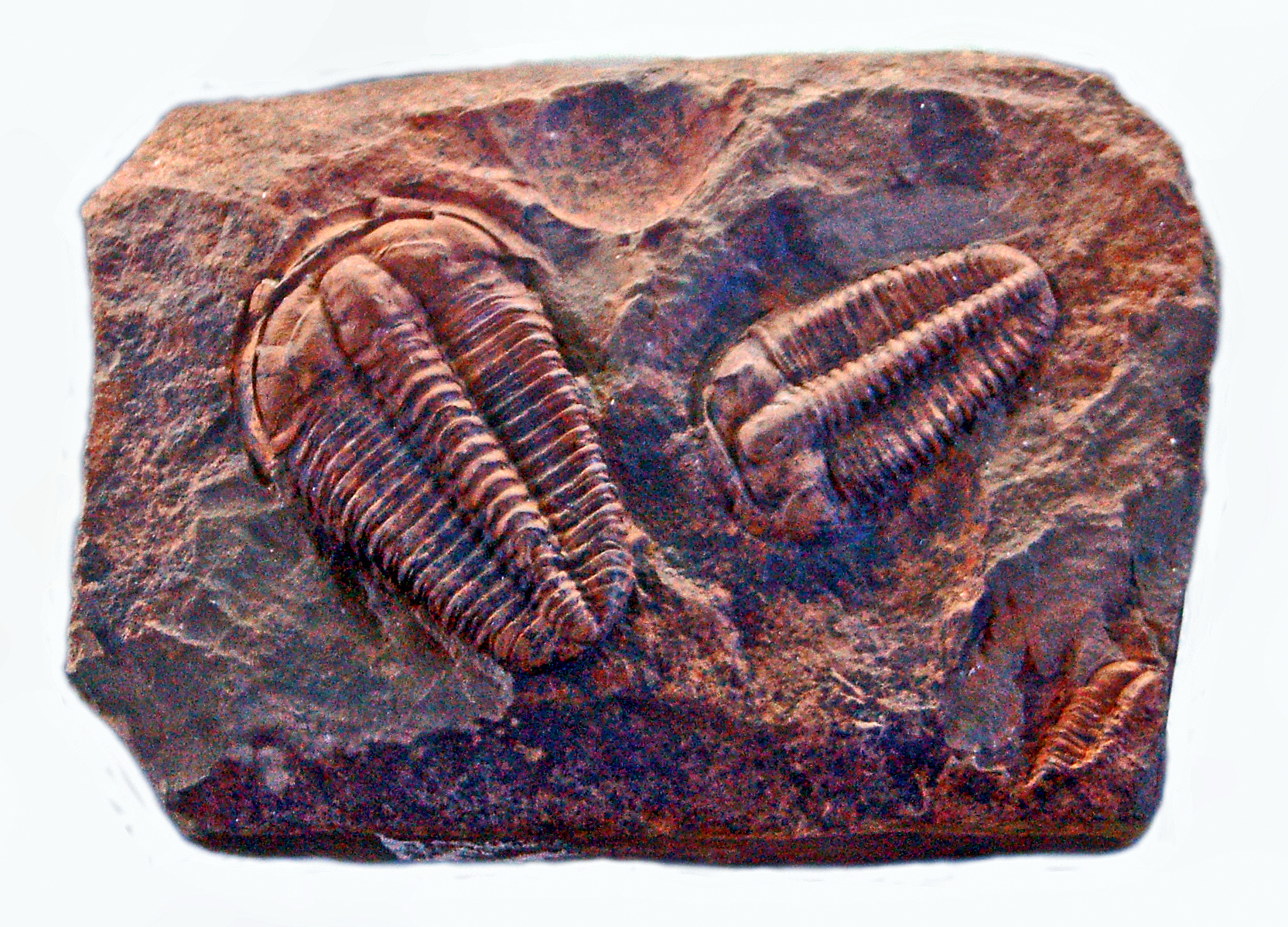
- Fossils of the Cambrian trilobite Ptychoparia
  †Ptychoparia
  - †Ptychoparia matheri – type locality for species
  - †Ptychoparia minuta
- †Ptychopteria
  - †Ptychopteria chemungensis
  - †Ptychopteria elongata
  - †Ptychopteria flabella
  - †Ptychopteria flabellum
  - †Ptychopteria mesacostalis
  - †Ptychopteria proto
  - †Ptychopteria subdecussata
- †Ptychosphaera
  - †Ptychosphaera thalia
- †Pugnoides
  - †Pugnoides pugnus
- †Punctomosea
  - †Punctomosea cristata
- †Punctoprimitia
  - †Punctoprimitia subaequalis
- †Pustulatia
  - †Pustulatia pustulosa
- †Pyrenmoeus
  - †Pyrenmoeus cuneatus
- †Pyrenomoeus
  - †Pyrenomoeus cuneatus
- †Pyrgopostibulla – type locality for genus
  - †Pyrgopostibulla belli – type locality for species
- †Pyrocystites
- †Pyronema

== Q ==
- †Quasillites
  - †Quasillites angulatus
  - †Quasillites subobliquus

== R ==
- †Radnoria
- †Rafinesquina
  - †Rafinesquina alternata
  - †Rafinesquina deltoidea
  - †Rafinesquina mucronata
  - †Rafinesquina nasuta
  - †Rafinesquina obscura
  - †Rafinesquina praecursor
  - †Rafinesquina prestonensis
- †Raphistoma
  - †Raphistoma stamineum
  - †Raphistoma striatum
- †Raphistomina
  - †Raphistomina undulata
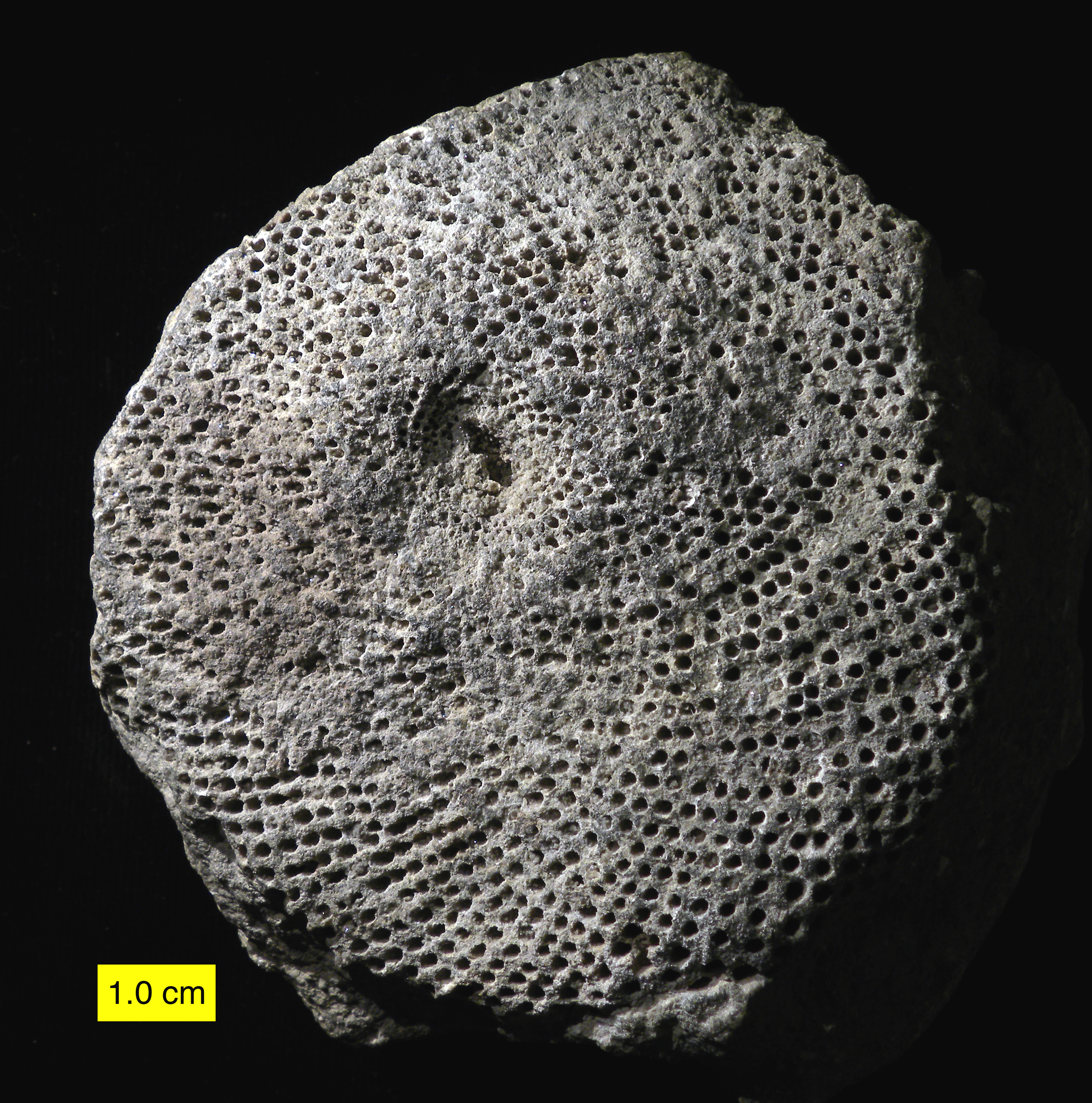
- Fossil of the Early Ordovician-Permian benthic alga Receptaculites
  †Receptaculites
  - †Receptaculites monticulatus – or unidentified related form
- †Redstonia
  - †Redstonia knaeckei – type locality for species
- †Reimannia
  - †Reimannia aldenense
  - †Reimannia aldenese
- †Rellimia
  - †Rellimia thomsonii
- †Remopleuridella – tentative report
  - †Remopleuridella obtusa
- †Remopleurides
  - †Remopleurides canadensis
- †Remopleuridiella – tentative report
  - †Remopleuridiella obtusa – type locality for species
- †Rensselaeria
  - †Rensselaeria elongata – or unidentified comparable form
- †Rensselaerina – tentative report
- †Reptaria
  - †Reptaria stolonifera
- †Resserella
  - †Resserella elegantula
- †Reteocrinus
  - †Reteocrinus stellaris
- †Reteograptus
- †Reteporina
- †Retichonetes
  - †Retichonetes obscurus – or unidentified related form
  - †Retichonetes setigerus
- †Reticularia
  - †Reticularia bicastata
  - †Reticularia bicostata
  - †Reticularia biocostata
- †Reticularograptus
  - †Reticularograptus retiforme
- †Reticulograptus
  - †Reticulograptus retiforme
- †Retiolites
  - †Retiolites geinitzianus
  - †Retiolites venosus
- †Retispira
  - †Retispira leda
  - †Retispira otsego – type locality for species
  - †Retispira repertus – type locality for species
- †Retusotriletes
  - †Retusotriletes goensis
  - †Retusotriletes rotundus
- †Rhabdosporites
  - †Rhabdosporites langi
  - †Rhabdosporites langii
- †Rhabdostropha
- †Rhacophyton
  - †Rhacophyton ceratangium
- †Rhinidictya
  - †Rhinidictya bryozoan
  - †Rhinidictya fenestrata
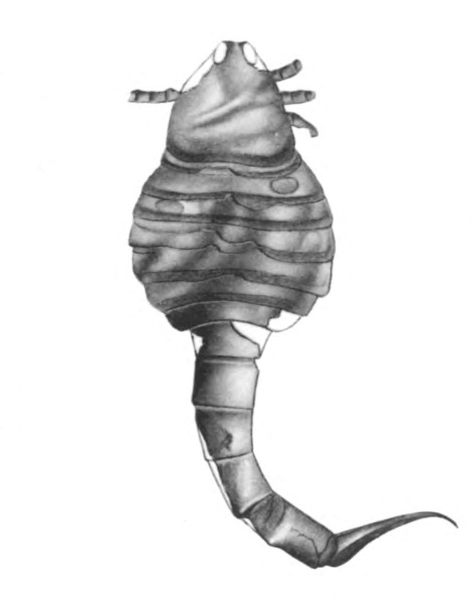
- Fossil of the Silurian eurypterid ("sea scorpion") Rhinocarcinosoma
  †Rhinocarcinosoma
  - †Rhinocarcinosoma cicerops
- †Rhinopora
  - †Rhinopora tuberculosa
  - †Rhinopora verrucosa
  - †Rhinopora verrucus
- †Rhipidomella
  - †Rhipidomella circulus
  - †Rhipidomella cyclas
  - †Rhipidomella hybrida
  - †Rhipidomella hybridia
  - †Rhipidomella leucosia
  - †Rhipidomella penelope
  - †Rhipidomella trigona
  - †Rhipidomella vanuxemi
- †Rhipidomelloides
  - †Rhipidomelloides oblata
- †Rhipidothyris
  - †Rhipidothyris lepida
  - †Rhipidothyris mulitplicata
  - †Rhipidothyris plicata
- †Rhodesognathus
  - †Rhodesognathus elegans
- †Rhombopora
  - †Rhombopora rhombifera
- †Rhombotrypa
  - †Rhombotrypa spinulifera
- †Rhymokalon
  - †Rhymokalon trichium
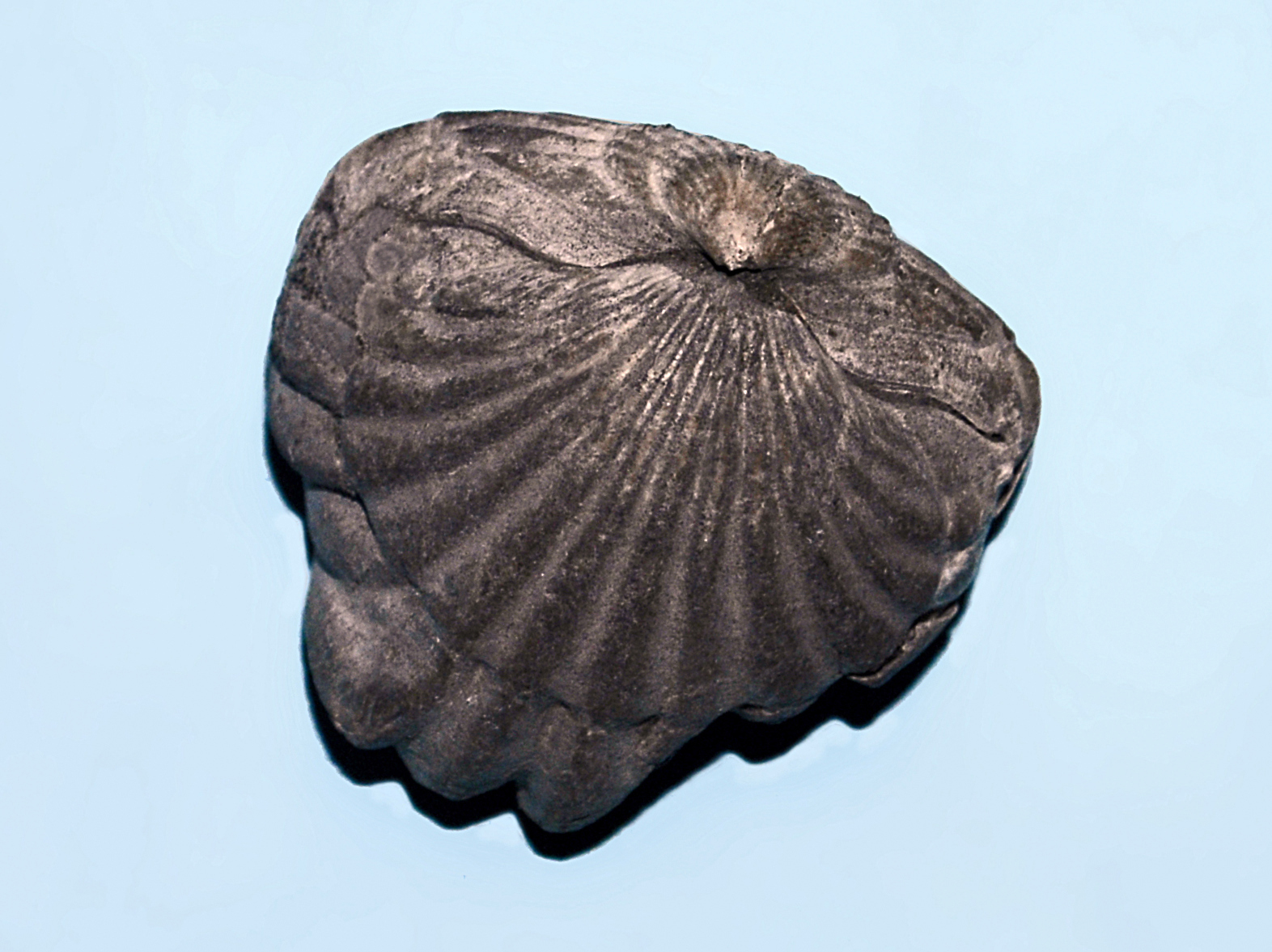
- Fossilized shell of the Silurian-Eocene articulate brachiopod Rhynchonella
  †Rhynchonella
  - †Rhynchonella bidens
  - †Rhynchonella bidentata
  - †Rhynchonella emacerata
  - †Rhynchonella formosa
- †Rhynchospirina
- †Rhynchotrema
  - †Rhynchotrema increbescens
- †Rhynchotreta
  - †Rhynchotreta americana
  - †Rhynchotreta robusta
- †Rhynidictya
  - †Rhynidictya fenestrata
- †Rhyssochonetes
  - †Rhyssochonetes aurora
  - †Rhyssochonetes filicostatus
- †Rhytimia
  - †Rhytimia buffaloensis – or unidentified comparable form
- †Rhytimya
- †Ribeiria
  - †Ribeiria taylori – type locality for species
- †Richina
  - †Richina selenicristata – type locality for species
- †Rimouskia
- †Ripidiorhynchus – tentative report
- †Robergiella
  - †Robergiella brevilingua – or unidentified comparable form
- †Roemerella
  - †Roemerella grandis
- †Romingeria
- †Rominigeria
- †Romnigeria
- †Ropalonaria
- †Rossodus
  - †Rossodus manitouensis
- Rostricellula
  - †Rostricellula major
  - †Rostricellula plena
  - †Rostricellula pristina
- †Roundyella – tentative report
  - †Roundyella concentrica – type locality for species
- †Rudolfoceras
  - †Rudolfoceras cornuoryx
- †Ruedemannia
  - †Ruedemannia lirata
  - †Ruedemannia trilix
- †Ruedemannipterus
  - †Ruedemannipterus stylonuroides
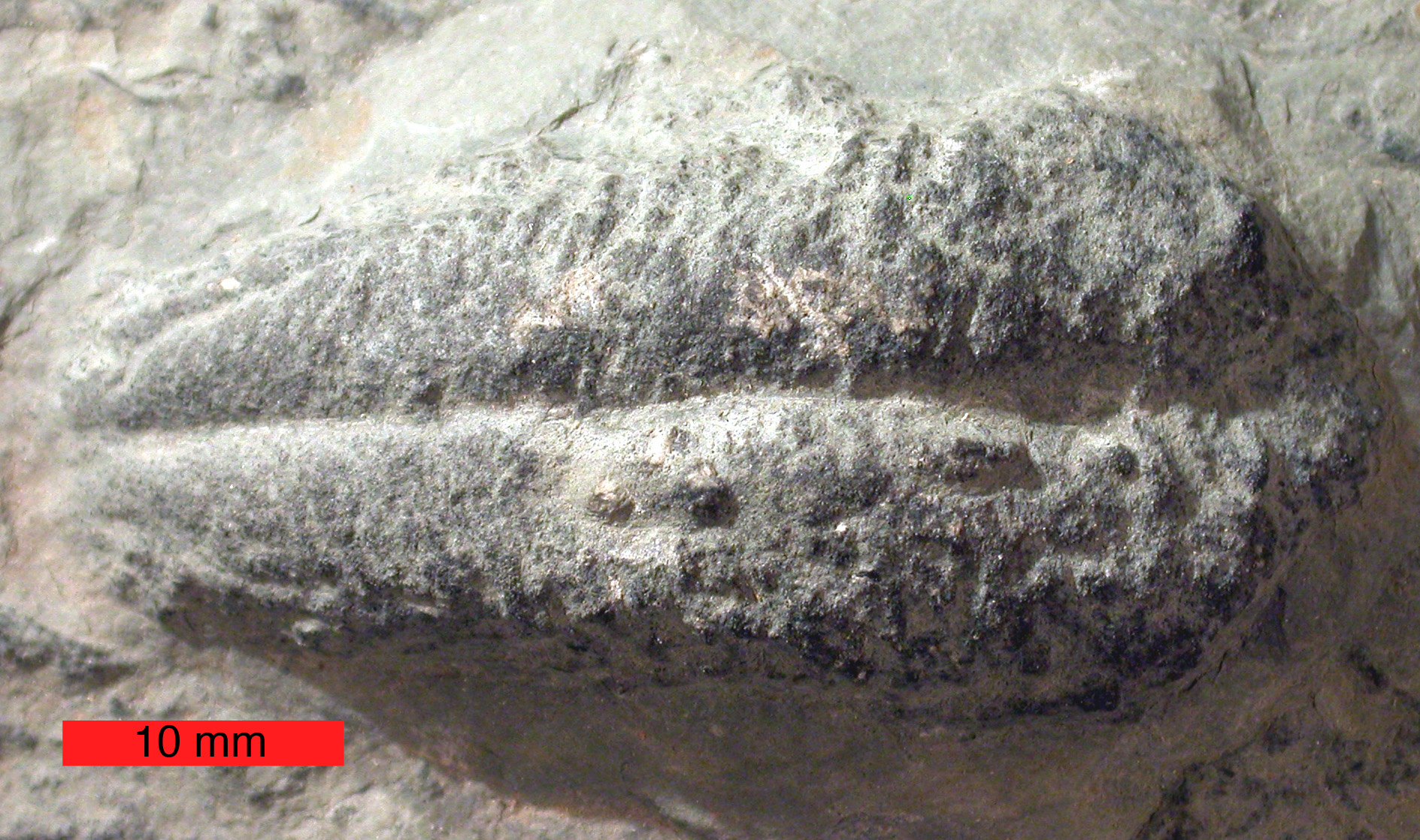
- Fossil of the arthropod burrow ichnogenus Rusophycus
  †Rusophycus
  - †Rusophycus biloba
  - †Rusophycus pudicum
  - †Rusophycus subangulatum

== S ==
- †Saccarchites
- †Saccocrinus
- †Salopina
  - †Salopina type locality for species A – informal
- †Sandbergeroceras
  - †Sandbergeroceras enfieldense – type locality for species
  - †Sandbergeroceras syngonum
- †Sanguinolites
  - †Sanguinolites contractus
  - †Sanguinolites cuneatus
  - †Sanguinolites solenoides
  - †Sanguinolites tiogensis
  - †Sanguinolites truncatus
- †Sapphicorhynchus
  - †Sapphicorhynchus sappho
- †Saratogia
- †Sawdonia
  - †Sawdonia ornata
- †Scalites
  - †Scalites angulatus
- †Scalpellodus
  - †Scalpellodus longipinnatus
- †Scapanocrinus
  - †Scapanocrinus muricatus
- †Scaptina
  - †Scaptina incuda – type locality for species
- †Scendium
  - †Scendium pyramidale
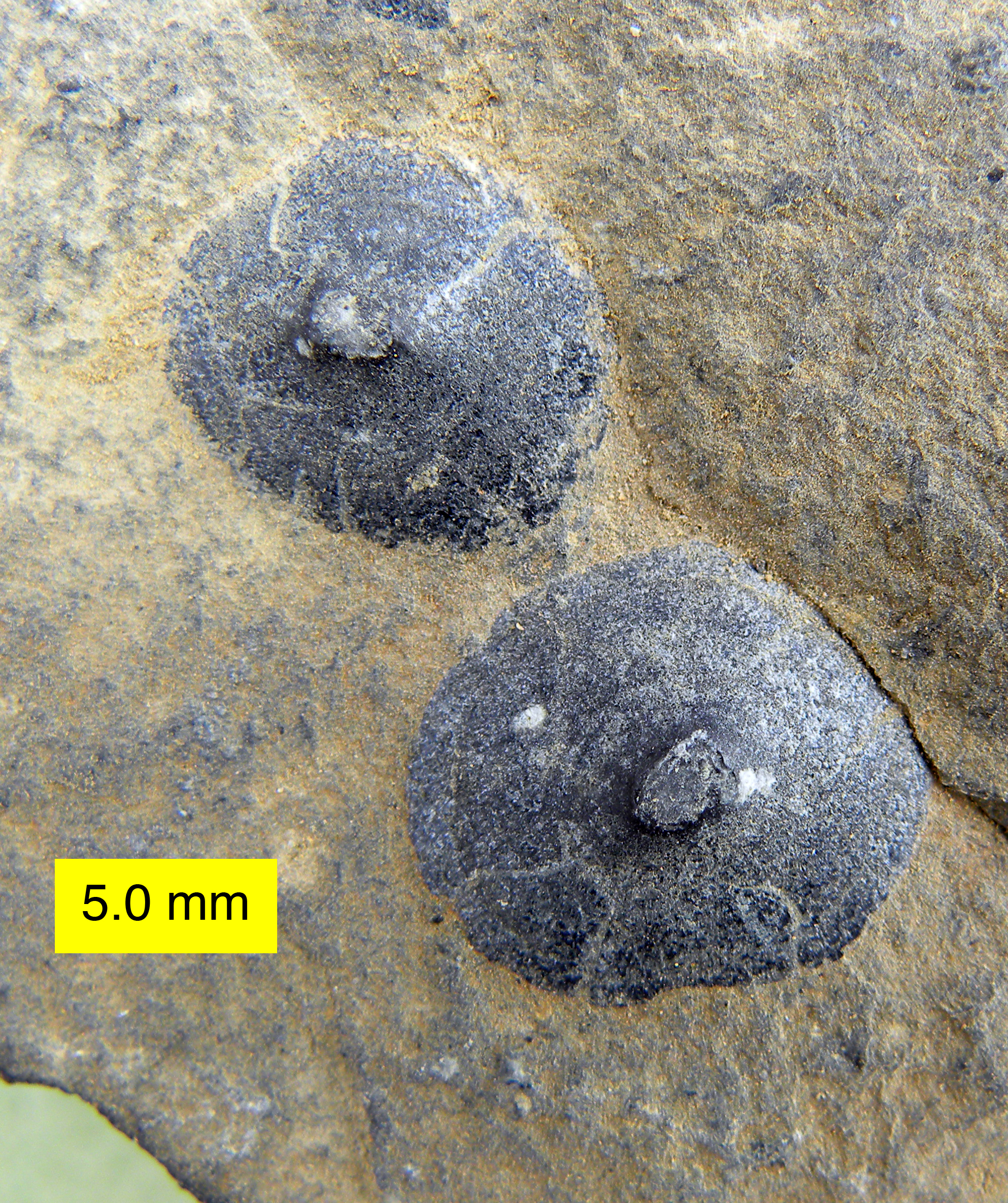
- Fossils of the Cambrian mollusc Scenella
  †Scenella
  - †Scenella montrealensis
  - †Scenella pretensa
  - †Scenella robusta
- †Scenophyllum
  - †Scenophyllum conigerum
- †Schindewolfoceras
  - †Schindewolfoceras chemungense
  - †Schindewolfoceras equicostatum – or unidentified related form
- †Schizambon
  - †Schizambon duplicimuratum
- †Schizo (genus)
- †Schizocrania
  - †Schizocrania filosa
- †Schizocrinus
  - †Schizocrinus nodosus
- †Schizodus
  - †Schizodus chemungensis
- †Schizonema
- †Schizopea
  - †Schizopea typica – type locality for species
- †Schizophoria
  - †Schizophoria impressa
  - †Schizophoria mulistriata
  - †Schizophoria multistriata
  - †Schizophoria striatula
  - †Schizophoria tioga
  - †Schizophoria tulliensis
  - †Schizophoria with
- †Schizopodium
  - †Schizopodium mummii
- †Schizotreta
  - †Schizotreta tenuilamellata
- †Schmidtella
  - †Schmidtella crassimarginata
- †Schuchertella
  - †Schuchertella arctostriata
  - †Schuchertella arctostriatus
  - †Schuchertella elegans
  - †Schuchertella interstriata
  - †Schuchertella marylandica – or unidentified comparable form
  - †Schuchertella pandora
  - †Schuchertella parva
  - †Schuchertella subplana
  - †Schuchertella sulcifer
  - †Schuchertella tenuis
  - †Schuchertella woolworthanus
- †Schuchetella
  - †Schuchetella arctostriatus
- †Scolopodus
  - †Scolopodus insculptus
- †Scutellum
  - †Scutellum niagarensis
- †Scyphocrinites
- †Seelyoceras
  - †Seelyoceras raei
- †Semiacontiodus
  - †Semiacontiodus iowensis
  - †Semiacontiodus nogamii
- †Semicoscinium
  - †Semicoscinium tenuiceps
- Serpula
- †Serpulites
- †Serpulospira
  - †Serpulospira eboracensis – type locality for species
  - †Serpulospira laxus
- †Serrodiscus
- †Serrulacaulis
  - †Serrulacaulis furcatus
- †Serulacaulis
  - †Serulacaulis furcatus
- †Shumardia
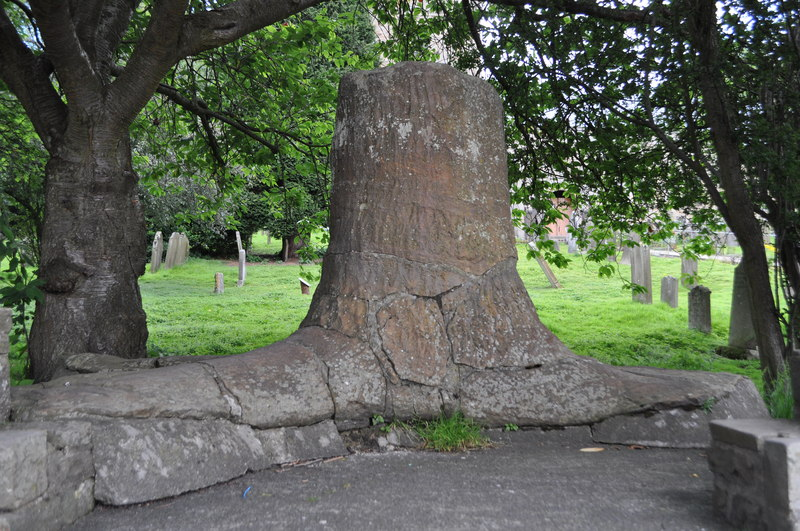
- Fossilized stump of the Carboniferous-Permian club moss relative Sigillaria
  †Sigillaria
  - †Sigillaria gilboensis
- †Silurovelella – type locality for genus
  - †Silurovelella casteri – type locality for species
- †Sinochonetes
  - †Sinochonetes lepidus
- †Sinuites
  - †Sinuites cancellatus – type locality for species
- †Sinuitina
  - †Sinuitina acutilira
  - †Sinuitina brevilineatus
- †Sinuopea
  - †Sinuopea emminencis – type locality for species
  - †Sinuopea parva – type locality for species
- †Siphonophrentis
  - †Siphonophrentis gigantea
- †Siphonophretis
  - †Siphonophretis variabilis
- †Skenidioides
  - †Skenidioides pyramidale
  - †Skenidioides pyramidalis
- †Skenidium
  - †Skenidium insignis – or unidentified comparable form
  - †Skenidium pyramidale
  - †Skenidium pyramidalis
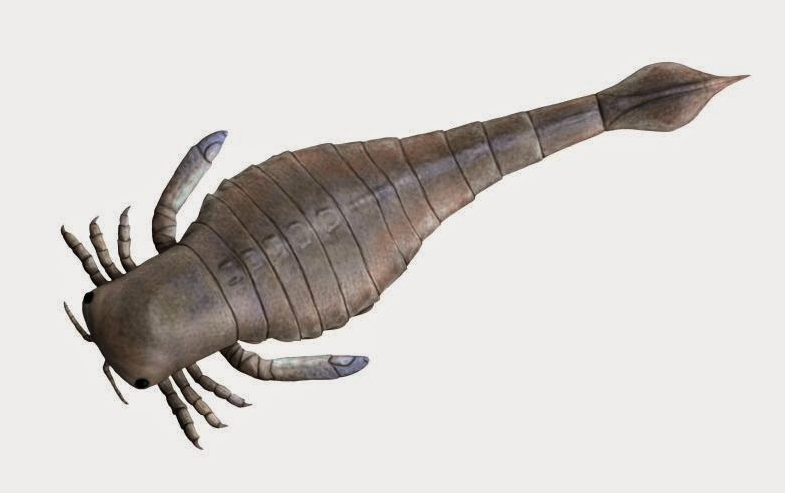
- Life restoration of the Silurian eurypterid ("sea scorpion") Slimonia
  †Slimonia
- †Solenopleura
- †Solenopora
  - †Solenopora compacta
- †Sowerbyella
  - †Sowerbyella curdvillensis
  - †Sowerbyella kayi
  - †Sowerbyella senaria
  - †Sowerbyella sericea
  - †Sowerbyella transversalis
- †Spathella
  - †Spathella typica
- †Spatiopora
  - †Spatiopora maculata
- †Spatipora
  - †Spatipora maculata
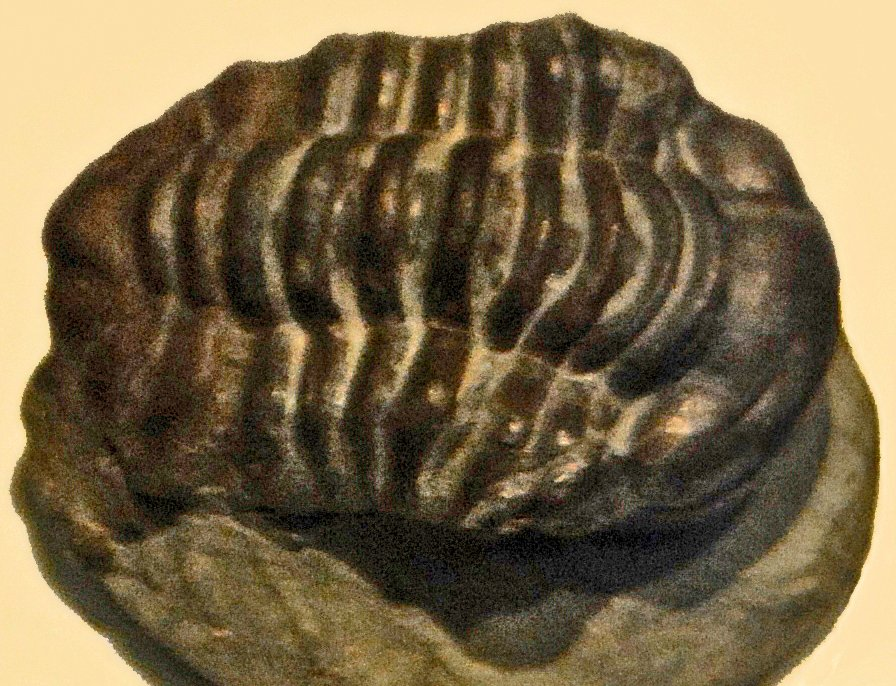
- Fossil of the Middle Ordovician-Silurian trilobite Sphaerexochus
  †Sphaerexochus
  - †Sphaerexochus parvus
  - †Sphaerexochus valcourensis
- †Sphaerocoryphe
  - †Sphaerocoryphe goodnovi
  - †Sphaerocoryphe robusta
- †Sphaeromanticoceras
  - †Sphaeromanticoceras oxy
  - †Sphaeromanticoceras rhynchostomum
  - †Sphaeromanticoceras rickardi
- †Sphaerospongia
  - †Sphaerospongia tessellata – or unidentified related form
- †Sphenophragmus
  - †Sphenophragmus nanus
- †Sphenosphaera
  - †Sphenosphaera fiscellostriata
- †Sphenotreta
  - †Sphenotreta acutirostris
- †Spinatrypa
  - †Spinatrypa hystrix
  - †Spinatrypa spinosa
- †Spinocespitosus
  - †Spinocespitosus parallelus
- †Spinocyrtia
  - †Spinocyrtia granulosa
  - †Spinocyrtia macbridei
  - †Spinocyrtia marcyi
- †Spinocyrtina
  - †Spinocyrtina granulosa
- †Spinoplasia
  - †Spinoplasia gaspensis – or unidentified comparable form
- †Spinozonotriletes – tentative report
  - †Spinozonotriletes naumovii – or unidentified comparable form
- †Spinulicosta
  - †Spinulicosta spinulicosta
- †Spinulocosta
  - †Spinulocosta spinulocosta
- †Spinyplatyceras
  - †Spinyplatyceras dumosum
  - †Spinyplatyceras fornicatum
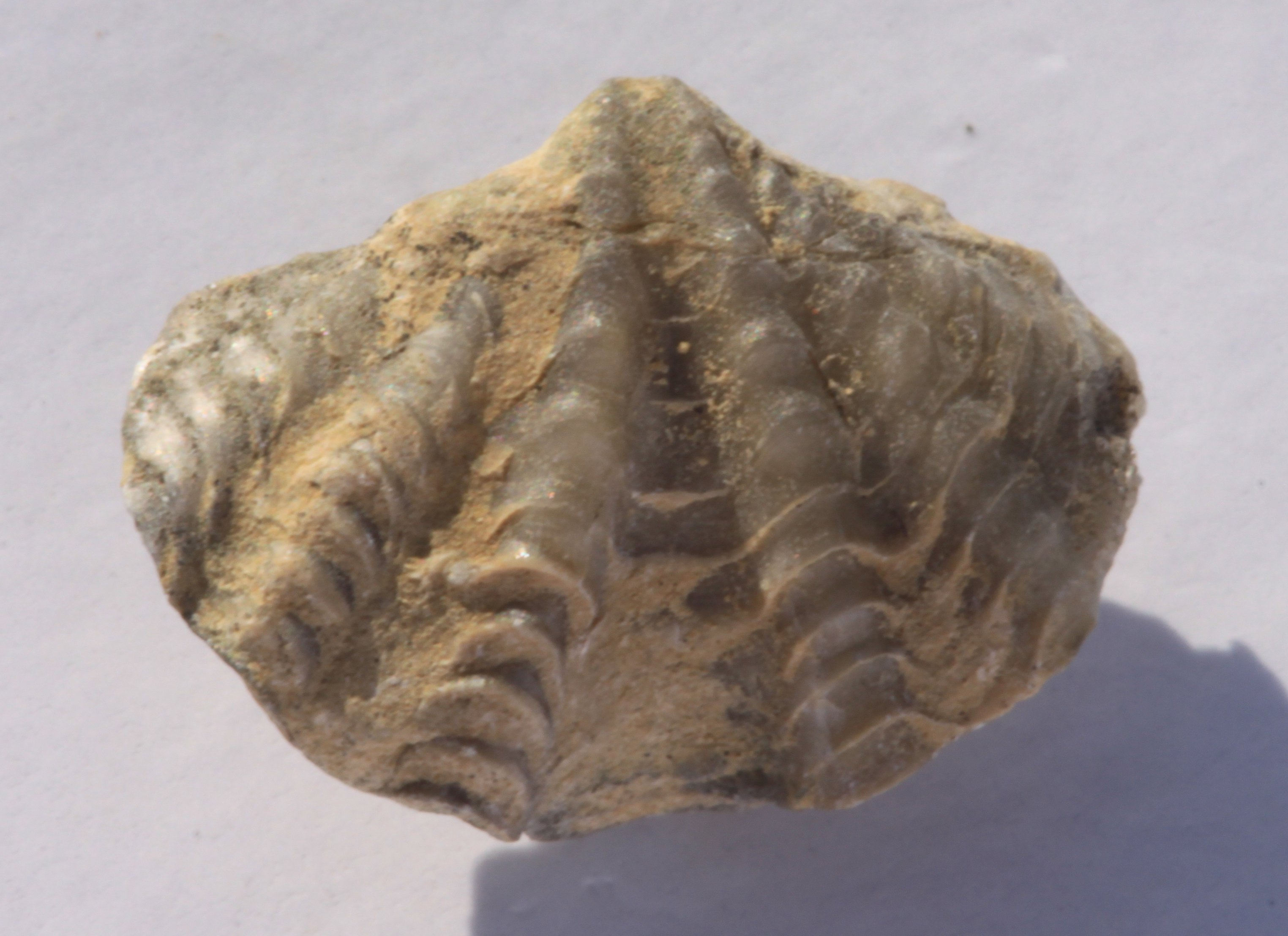
- Fossilized shell of the Late Ordovician-Late Triassic brachiopod Spirifer
  †Spirifer
  - †Spirifer anchiasper
  - †Spirifer anchiaspirifer
  - †Spirifer aroostookensis
  - †Spirifer crispatus
  - †Spirifer crispus
  - †Spirifer duodenarius
  - †Spirifer eudora
  - †Spirifer macra
  - †Spirifer macrothyris
  - †Spirifer macrus
  - †Spirifer marcyi
  - †Spirifer mesicostalis
  - †Spirifer mesistrialis
  - †Spirifer niagarensis
  - †Spirifer posterus
  - †Spirifer raricosta
  - †Spirifer repertus
  - †Spirifer sculptilis
  - †Spirifer subcuspidatus
  - †Spirifer sulcata
  - †Spirifer sulcatus
  - †Spirifer varicosa
  - †Spirifer varicosta
  - †Spirifer williamsi
- †Spirobis
- †Spirobus
- †Spirodentalium – tentative report
- †Spirophyton
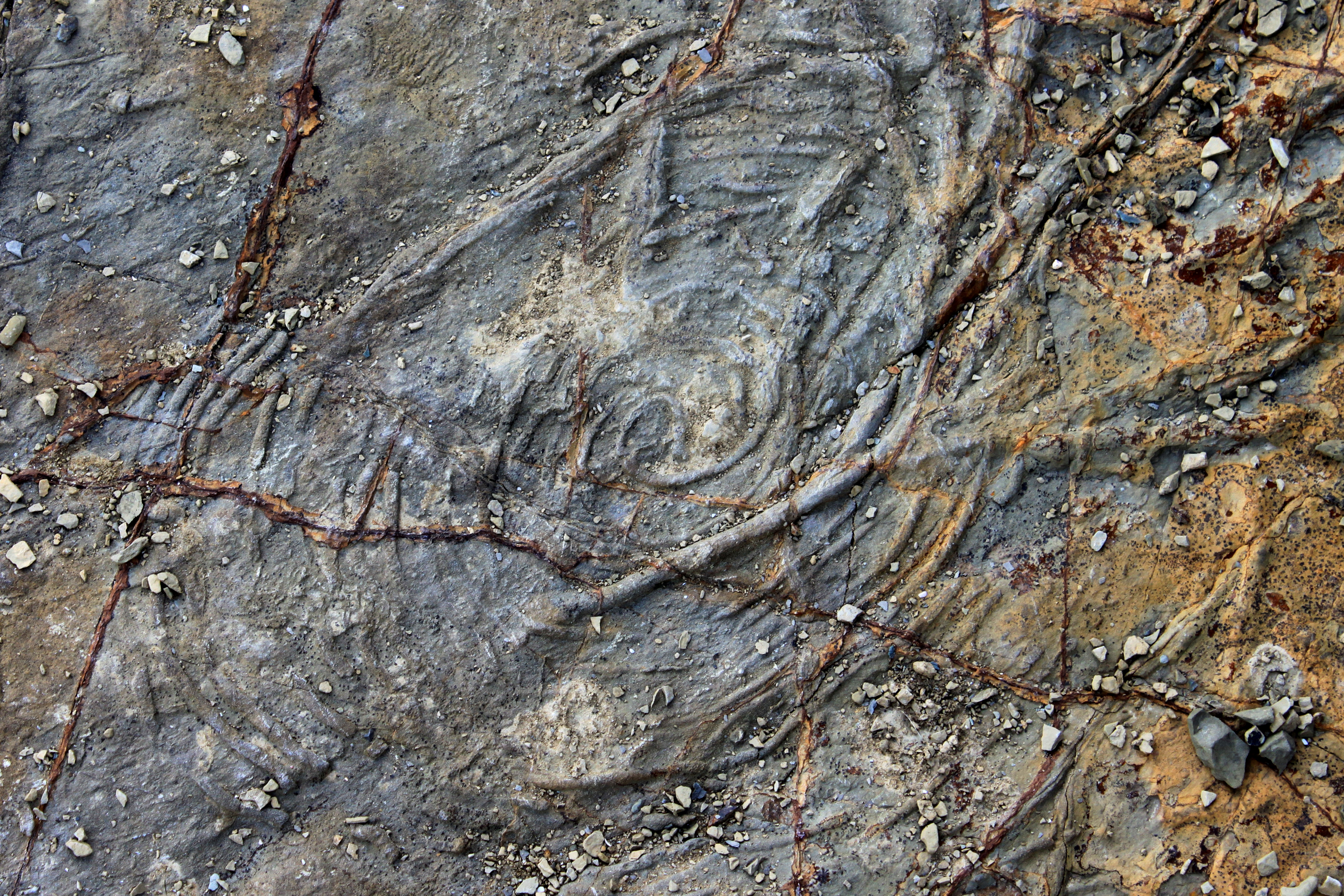
- Fossil of the burrow ichnogenus Spirorhaphe
  †Spiroraphe
  - †Spiroraphe galtensis
- Spirorbis
  - †Spirorbis laxa
- †Spyroceras
  - †Spyroceras crotalum
  - †Spyroceras geneva
  - †Spyroceras nuntium
- †Staurograptus
- †Stegerhynchus
  - †Stegerhynchus acinus
  - †Stegerhynchus neglectum
  - †Stegerhynchus neglectus
- †Stenokoleos
  - †Stenokoleos bifidus
  - †Stenokoleos holmesii
- †Stenoloron
  - †Stenoloron areyi – type locality for species
- †Stenopareia
  - †Stenopareia globosus
- †Stenopora
  - †Stenopora fibrosa
  - †Stenopora patula
- †Stenoscisma
- †Stephanocrinus
  - †Stephanocrinus angulatus
  - †Stephanocrinus gemmiformis
- †Stereolasma
  - †Stereolasma rectum
- †Stereospyroceras
  - †Stereospyroceras clintoni
- †Steriolasma
  - †Steriolasma rectum
- †Steroolasma
  - †Steroolasma rectum
- †Stewartophyllum
  - †Stewartophyllum intermittens
- †Stictopora
  - †Stictopora blackensis
  - †Stictopora fenestrata
  - †Stictopora labyrintha
  - †Stictopora labyrinthica
- †Stictoporella
- †Stictotrypa
  - †Stictotrypa punctipora
- †Stigmatella
- †Stipatocrinus
- Stomatopora
- †Straelenia
- †Straparolis
- †Straparollina
  - †Straparollina hudsoni
- †Straparollus
  - †Straparollus clymenioides
  - †Straparollus planodiscus
- †Strataster
  - †Strataster maciverorum – type locality for species
- †Streblocrinus – type locality for genus
  - †Streblocrinus brachiatus – type locality for species
- †Strepsodiscus
  - †Strepsodiscus hoyti
- †Streptelasma
  - †Streptelasma corniculum
- †Strepulites
  - †Strepulites divectus – type locality for species
- †Striacoceras
  - †Striacoceras typum
- †Striatochonetes
  - †Striatochonetes flexuosus
  - †Striatochonetes flexuousus
  - †Striatochonetes setigera
  - †Striatochonetes setigerus
- †Striatopora
  - †Striatopora flexuosa
- †Striatostyliolina
- †Stricklandia
- †Strigigenalis
  - †Strigigenalis cassinensis
- †Striispirifer
  - †Striispirifer niagarensis
- †Strobeus
  - †Strobeus onondagaensis
- †Stromatocerium
  - †Stromatocerium rugosum
- †Stromatopora
  - †Stromatopora constellata
- †Strophalosia
  - †Strophalosia truncata
- †Stropheodonta
  - †Stropheodonta demissa
- †Strophochonetes
  - †Strophochonetes cornutus
- †Strophodonta
  - †Strophodonta demissa
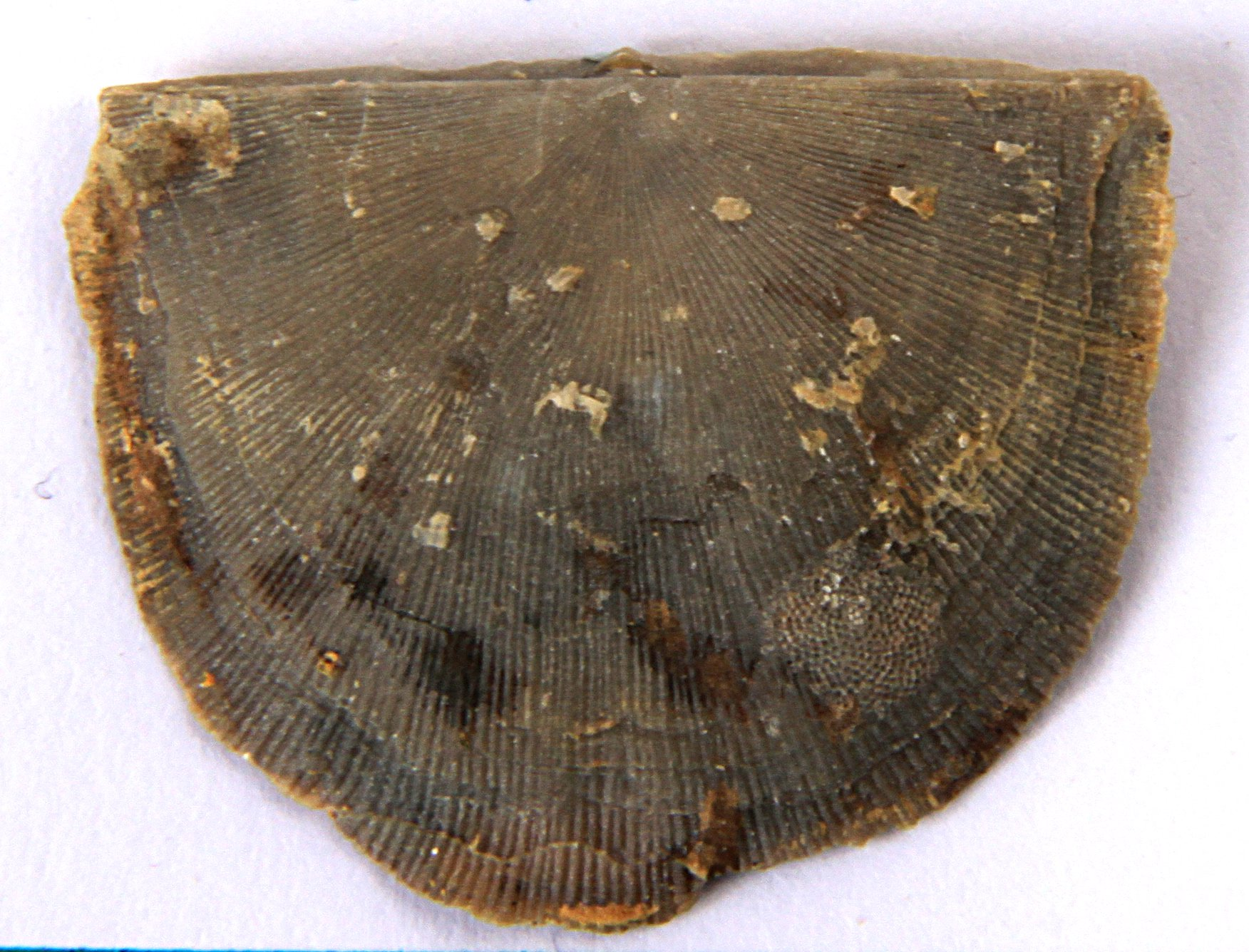
- Fossilized shell of the Ordovician-Silurian brachiopod Strophomena
  †Strophomena
  - †Strophomena acutiradiata
  - †Strophomena conradi
  - †Strophomena convexa
  - †Strophomena corrugata
  - †Strophomena crassa
  - †Strophomena deflecta
  - †Strophomena inaequistriata
  - †Strophomena incurvata
  - †Strophomena inequiradiata
  - †Strophomena iowensis
  - †Strophomena orthididea
  - †Strophomena pentagonia
  - †Strophomena profunda
  - †Strophomena subplana
- †Strophoneila
  - †Strophoneila punctulifera
- †Strophonella
  - †Strophonella ampla
  - †Strophonella headleyana – or unidentified comparable form
  - †Strophonella leavenworthana
  - †Strophonella patenta
  - †Strophonella punctulifera
  - †Strophonella striata
- †Strophostylus
  - †Strophostylus cancellata
  - †Strophostylus fitchi – type locality for species
  - †Strophostylus rotundata – type locality for species
- Stylaraea
  - †Stylaraea parva
- †Stylioina
  - †Stylioina fissurella
- †Styliolina
  - †Styliolina fissurella
- †Styliolinid
- †Stylonema
  - †Stylonema robusta – type locality for species
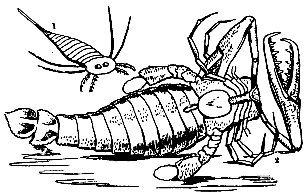
- Life restoration of the Devonian eurypterid ("sea scorpion") Stylonurus
  †Stylonurus
- †Subligaculum
  - †Subligaculum aculeatus – type locality for species
  - †Subligaculum laciniosum
- †Subretepora
- †Subulites
  - †Subulites elongatus
  - †Subulites prolongata
- †Suecoceras
  - †Suecoceras marcoui
- †Sulcella
  - †Sulcella emicatusa – type locality for species
- †Sulcoretepora
  - †Sulcoretepora inscissurata
- †Sulcoretopera
- †Sulcoretopora
  - †Sulcoretopora incisurata – or unidentified comparable form
- †Svalbardia
  - †Svalbardia banksii
- †Syaptocrinus
  - †Syaptocrinus nintius
- †Symphysurina
  - †Symphysurina convexa
  - †Symphysurina myopia – type locality for species
- †Synaptocrinus
  - †Synaptocrinus nuntius
- †Synaptophyllum
  - †Synaptophyllum simcoense
- †Synbathocrinus
  - †Synbathocrinus canandaigua
- †Synphoria – report made of unidentified related form or using admittedly obsolete nomenclature
- †Synphoroides
  - †Synphoroides pleuroptyx
- †Syringaxon
  - †Syringaxon rudis
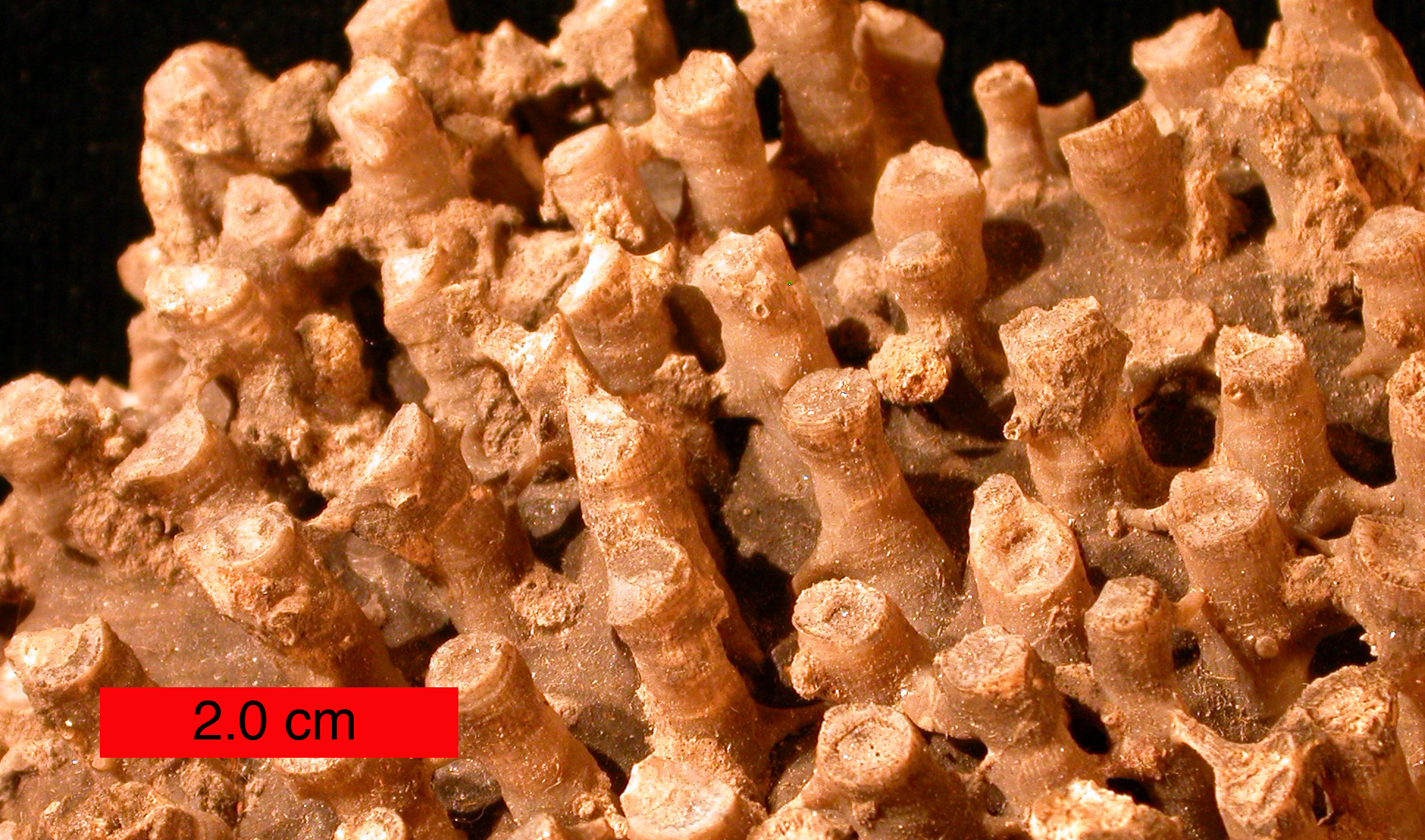
- Fossil of the Devonian tabulate coral Syringopora
  †Syringopora

== T ==
- †Tabulophyllum
  - †Tabulophyllum orientale
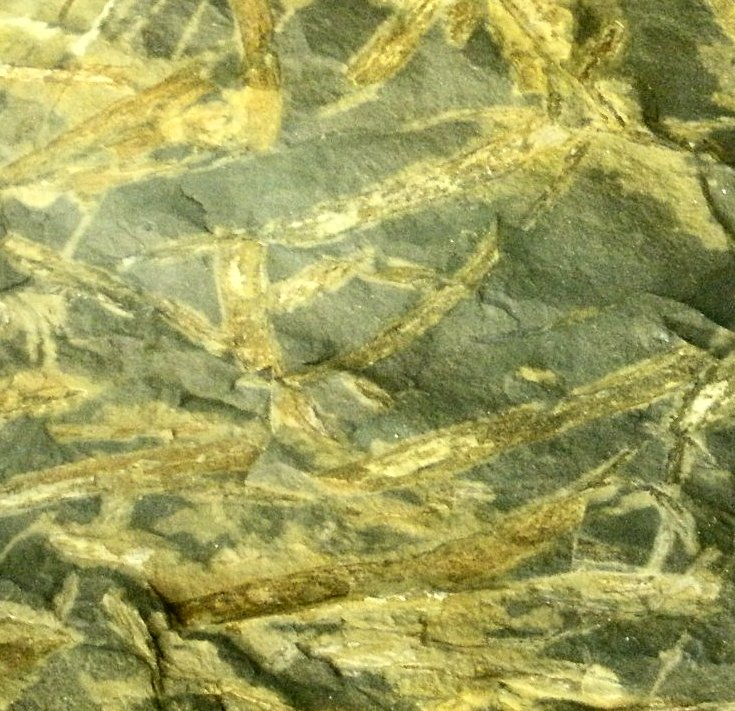
- Fossils of the Devonian plant stem morphogenus Taeniocrada
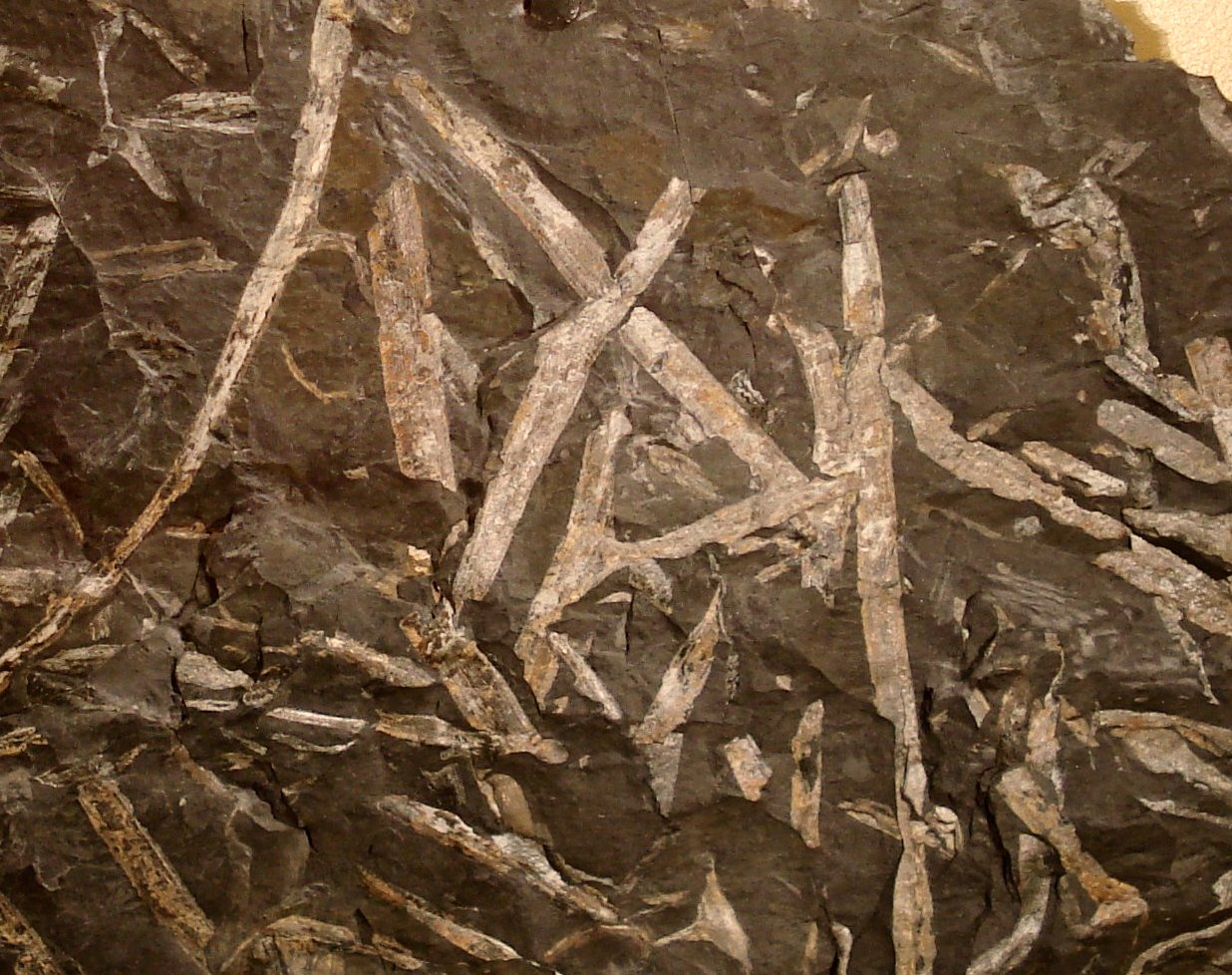
  Fossils of the Devonian plant stem morphogenus Taeniocrada
  †Taeniocrada
  - †Taeniocrada stilesvillensis
- †Taeniopora
  - †Taeniopora exigua
- †Taineopora
- †Taonurus
  - †Taonurus caudagalli
- †Tarphyceras
  - †Tarphyceras clarkei
  - †Tarphyceras farnsworthi
  - †Tarphyceras multicameratum
- †Technophorus
  - †Technophorus cancellatus – type locality for species
- †Tellinopsis
  - †Tellinopsis subemarginata
  - †Tellinopsis subemargula
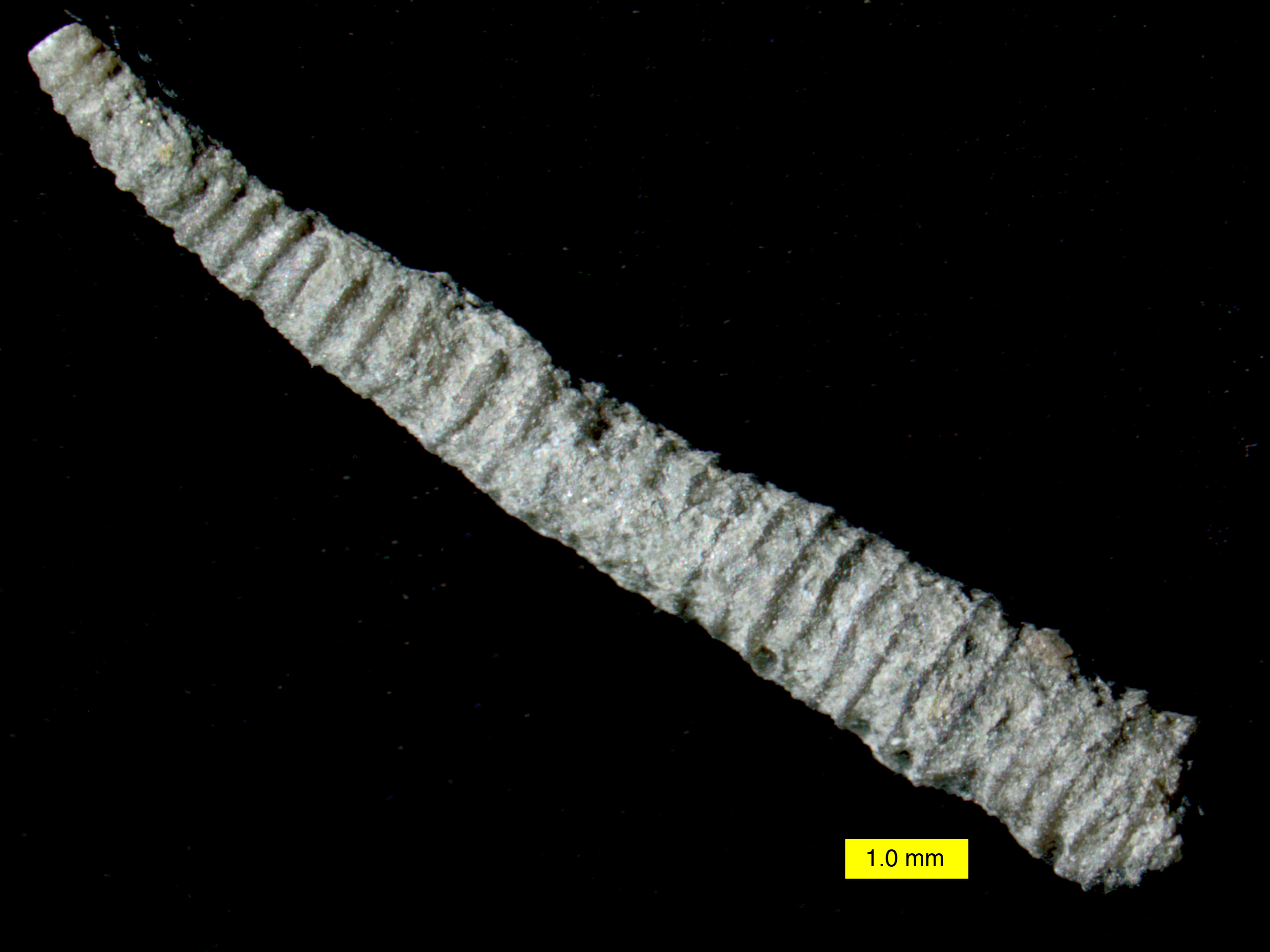
- Fossilized shell of the Early Ordovician-Late Devonian probable mollusc Tentaculites
  †Tentaculites
  - †Tentaculites bellulus
  - †Tentaculites elongatus
  - †Tentaculites gracilis
  - †Tentaculites gyracanthus
  - †Tentaculites minutus
  - †Tentaculites scalariformis
  - †Tentaculites scaleriformis
  - †Tentaculites simmondsi
  - †Tentaculites spiculus
- †Tetradium
  - †Tetradium cellulosum
- †Tetranodoceras
  - †Tetranodoceras transversum
- †Tetranota
  - †Tetranota bidorsata
- †Tetrasacculus
  - †Tetrasacculus magnivelatus – or unidentified comparable form
  - †Tetrasacculus paeneteichus – type locality for species
- Diagram of the branches of the Middle-Late Devonian vascular plant Tetraxylopteris
  †Tetraxylopteris
  - †Tetraxylopteris BR4
  - †Tetraxylopteris schmidtii
- †Thaerocrinus
  - †Thaerocrinus crenatus
- †Thalamocrinus
- †Thaleops
  - †Thaleops longispina – type locality for species
  - †Thaleops ovata
  - †Thaleops punctata
  - †Thaleops raymondi
- †Thamnopora
- †Thamnoptychia
  - †Thamnoptychia limbata
  - †Thamnoptychia ornata
  - †Thamnoptychia romingeri
- †Thiemella
  - †Thiemella danbyi
  - †Thiemella danybi
  - †Thiemella leonensis
- †Thlipsurella – tentative report
- †Thylacocrinus
  - †Thylacocrinus clarkei
- †Tormosocrinus
  - †Tormosocrinus furberi
- †Tornoceras
  - †Tornoceras arcuatum
  - †Tornoceras typum – or unidentified comparable form
  - †Tornoceras uniangulare
- †Tremanotus
  - †Tremanotus angustata
  - †Tremanotus profundus – type locality for species
- †Trematis
  - †Trematis terminalis
- †Trematopora
  - †Trematopora tuberculata
  - †Trematopora tuberculosa
- †Trematospira
  - †Trematospira camura
  - †Trematospira gibbosa
  - †Trematospira perforata – or unidentified comparable form
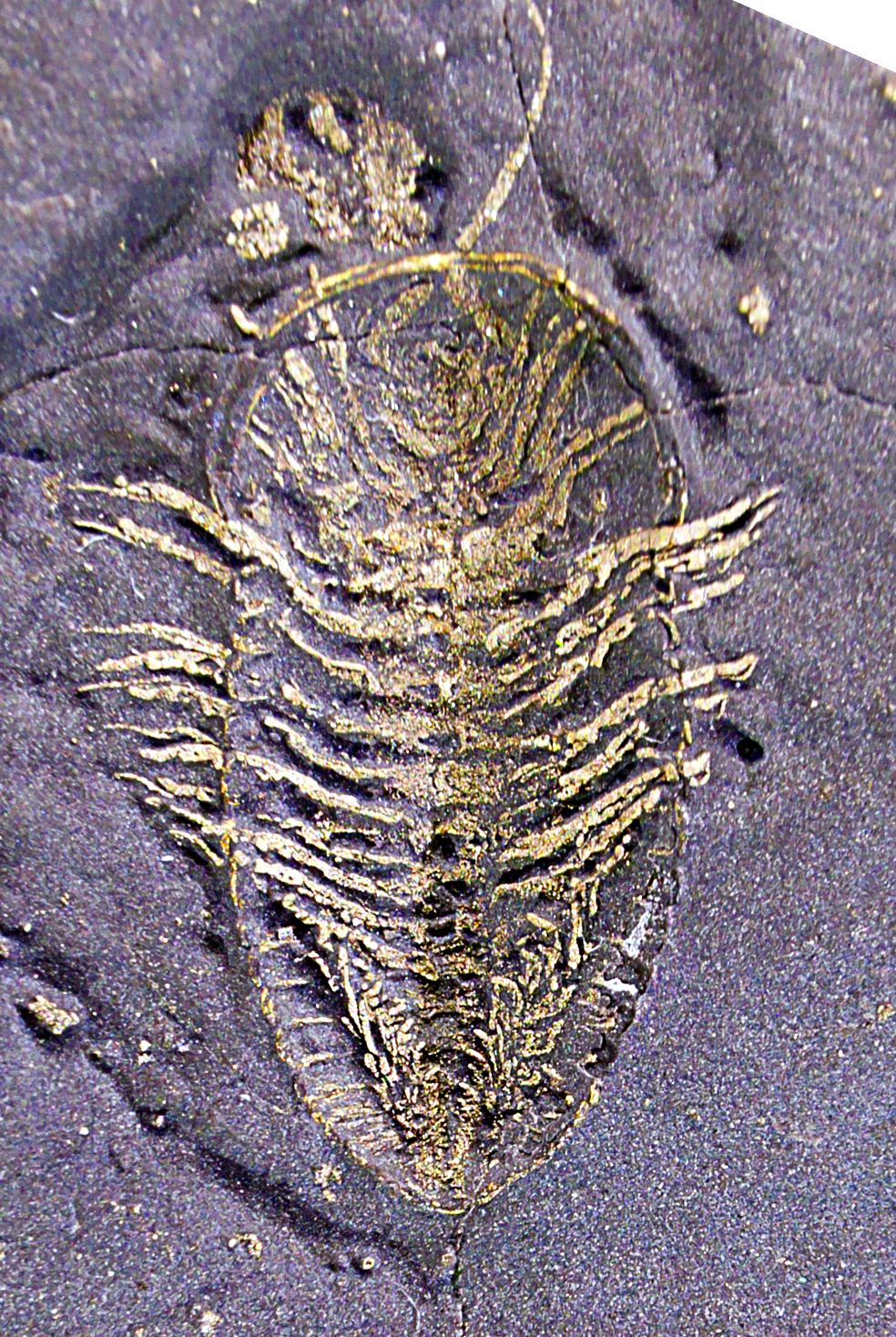
- Fossil preserving limbs and antennae as pyrite (fool's gold) of the underside of the Late Ordovician trilobite Triarthrus
  †Triarthrus
  - †Triarthrus becki
  - †Triarthrus eatoni
- †Tricornina
- †Triendoceras
  - †Triendoceras orthoseptatum
- †Trigonodictya
  - †Trigonodictya acuta
- †Trigonograptus
- †Trigrammaria
- †Triloboxylon
  - †Triloboxylon arnoldii
  - †Triloboxylon ashlandicum
- †Trimerus
  - †Trimerus delphinocephalus
- †Triplesia
- †Tripteroceras
  - †Tripteroceras cariniferum – type locality for species
- †Tritonophon
  - †Tritonophon trilobatus
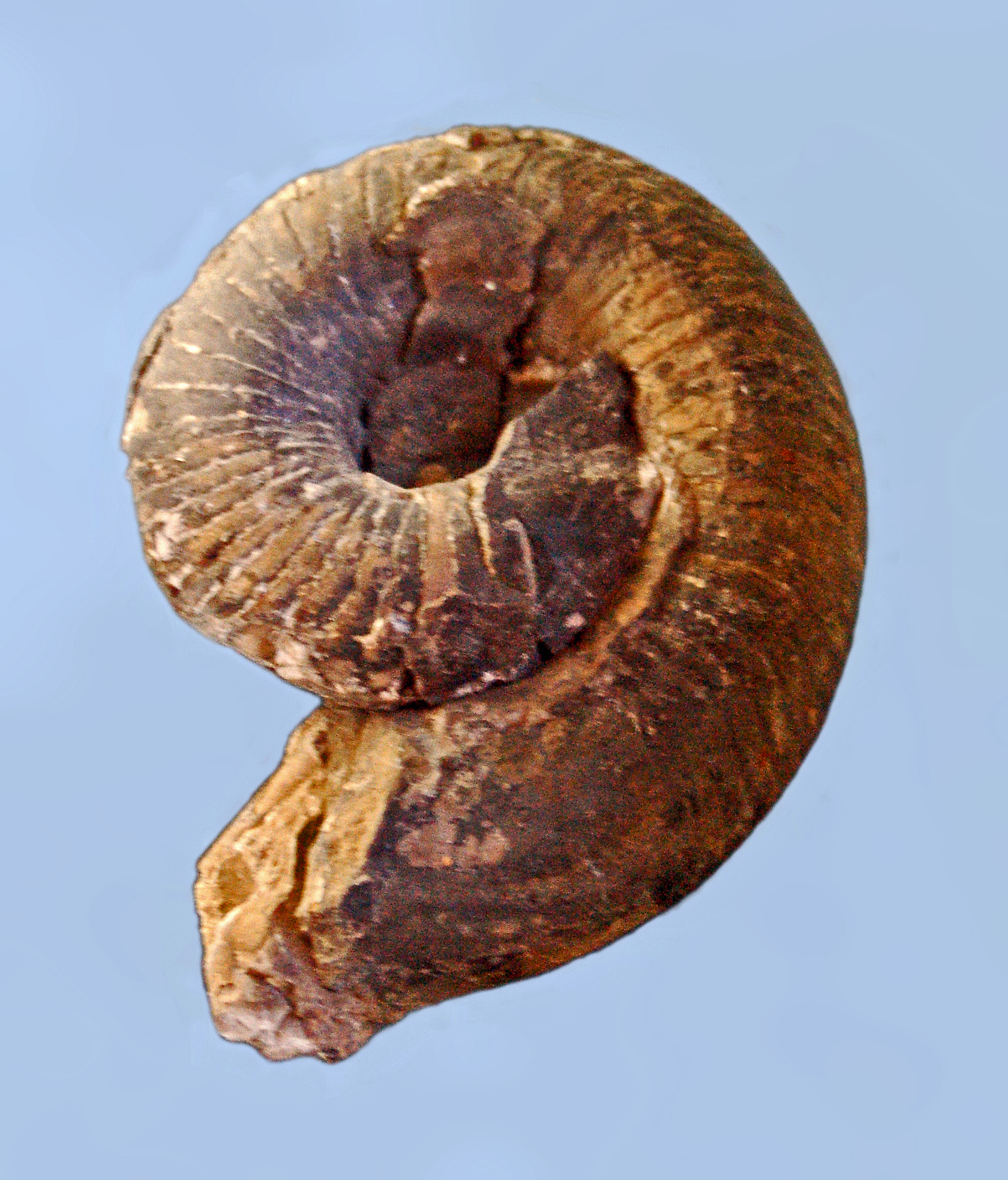
- Fossilized shell of the Middle-Late Devonian nautiloid cephalopod Trochoceras
  †Trochoceras
- †Trocholites
  - †Trocholites ammonius
  - †Trocholites gracilis
  - †Trocholites ruedemanni
- †Trochonema
  - †Trochonema dispar
  - †Trochonema rectangularis
- †Trochonemella
  - †Trochonemella knoxvillensis
- †Tropidocoryphe
  - †Tropidocoryphe richterorum – type locality for species
- †Tropidodiscus
  - †Tropidodiscus curvilineatus
- †Tropidoleptus
  - †Tropidoleptus carinatus
- †Tropodus
  - †Tropodus comptus
- †Truncalosia
  - †Truncalosia truncata
- †Truyolsoceras
  - †Truyolsoceras bicostatum – type locality for species
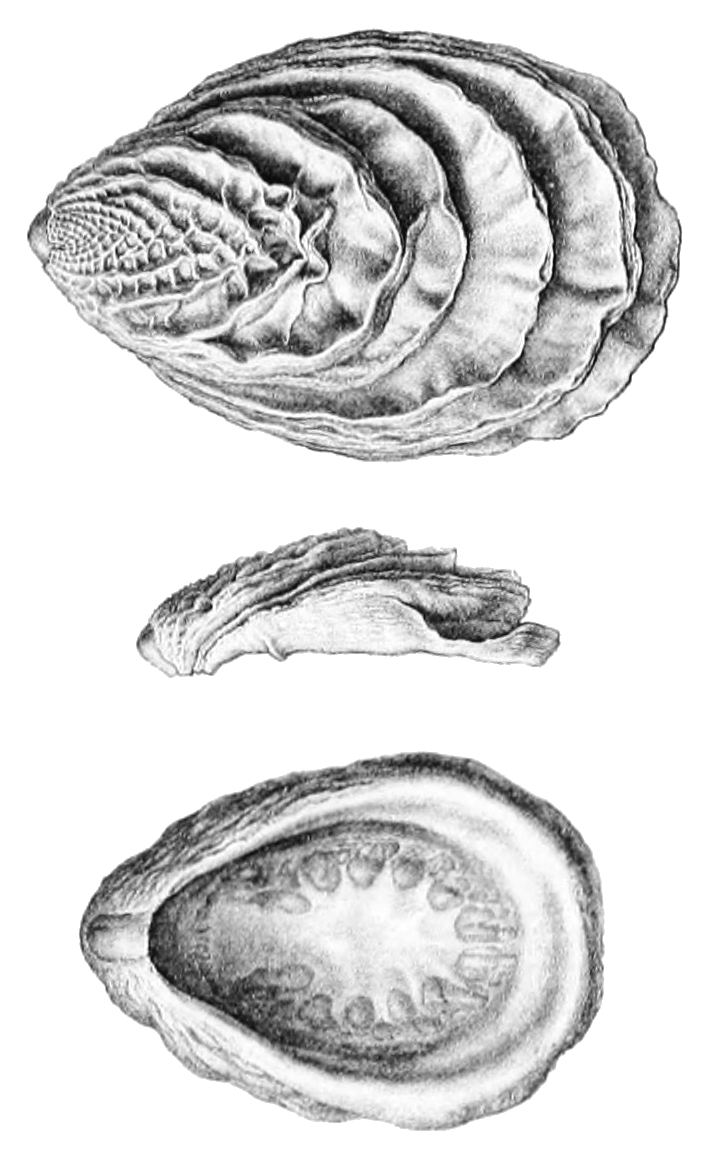
- Illustration of a fossilized shell in multiple views of the Silurian monoplacophoran mollusc Tryblidium reticulatum. Head region is to the left.
  †Tryblidium
- †Tryplasma
  - †Tryplasma fascicularium – type locality for species
- †Tubulibairdia
  - †Tubulibairdia windomensis
- †Tullypothyridina
  - †Tullypothyridina venestula
- †Tylothyris
  - †Tylothyris clarksvillensis
  - †Tylothyris mesa
  - †Tylothyris mesacostalis
  - †Tylothyris mesicostalis
  - †Tylothyris novamexicana
  - †Tylothyris pauliformis
- †Tyserella
  - †Tyserella pauliformis
- †Tytthocrinus
  - †Tytthocrinus arcarius – type locality for species

== U ==
- †Ulrichia
  - †Ulrichia acricula
  - †Ulrichia fragilis
  - †Ulrichia illinearis
  - †Ulrichia spinifera
  - †Ulrichia ventura – type locality for species
- †Ulrichodina
  - †Ulrichodina abnormalis
- †Ulrichostylus
- †Uncinulus
  - †Uncinulus abruptus
  - †Uncinulus mutabilis
  - †Uncinulus nucleolatus
  - †Uncinulus pyramidatus
- †Unitrypa
- †Uromystrum
  - †Uromystrum brevispinum
  - †Uromystrum minor

== V ==
- †Vaginoceras
  - †Vaginoceras oppletum
- †Valcourea
  - †Valcourea strophomenoides
- †Valcouroceras
  - †Valcouroceras bovinum
  - †Valcouroceras cyclops
  - †Valcouroceras elongatum – type locality for species
  - †Valcouroceras obesum
  - †Valcouroceras tenuiseptum
- †Vaningenoceras
  - †Vaningenoceras indomitum
  - †Vaningenoceras styliforme
- †Vanuxemia
  - †Vanuxemia limbata
- †Variabiloconus
  - †Variabiloconus bassleri
  - †Variabiloconus lineatus
- †Vassaroceras
  - †Vassaroceras henrietta – type locality for species
- †Velibeyrichia
- †Vermiforafacta
  - †Vermiforafacta rollinsi
- †Vermiforichnus
  - †Vermiforichnus clarkei
- †Vernonaspis
- †Vertumnia
  - †Vertumnia reversa
- †Vetupraeca
  - †Vetupraeca duplicata
  - †Vetupraeca vetusta – type locality for species
- †Viriatellina
- †Vogdesia
  - †Vogdesia bearsi
  - †Vogdesia obtusus

== W ==
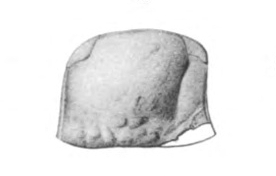
- Fossilized head of the Silurian eurypterid ("sea scorpion") Waeringopterus
  †Waeringopterus
  - †Waeringopterus cumberlandicus
  - †Waeringopterus vernonensis
- †Walcottoceras
- †Walliserodus
  - †Walliserodus sancticlairi
- †Warrenella
  - †Warrenella laevis
  - †Warrenella magna
- †Wellsites
  - †Wellsites tynani
  - †Wellsites williamsi – type locality for species
- †Whidbornella
  - †Whidbornella hirsuta
  - †Whidbornella lachrymosa
- †Whiteavsia
  - †Whiteavsia expansa
  - †Whiteavsia undata
- †Whitfieldella
  - †Whitfieldella cylindrica
  - †Whitfieldella intermedia
  - †Whitfieldella naviformis
  - †Whitfieldella naviormis
  - †Whitfieldella nitida
  - †Whitfieldella oblata
- †Whitfieldia – tentative report
- †Whitfieldoceras
  - †Whitfieldoceras lenticontractum – type locality for species
- †Wurmiella
  - †Wurmiella excavata

== X ==
- †Xenocladia
  - †Xenocladia medullosina
- †Xystostrophia
  - †Xystostrophia woolworthana

== Y ==
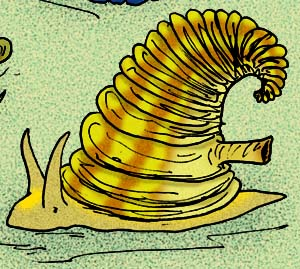
- Life restoration of the probable Cambrian mollusc Yochelcionella
  †Yochelcionella
  - †Yochelcionella greenlandica
- †Yochelsonella – type locality for genus
  - †Yochelsonella compressa – type locality for species
- †Yorba

== Z ==
- †Zaphrenthis
  - †Zaphrenthis bilateralis
  - †Zaphrenthis turbinata
- †Zittelloceras
  - †Zittelloceras praecedens – type locality for species
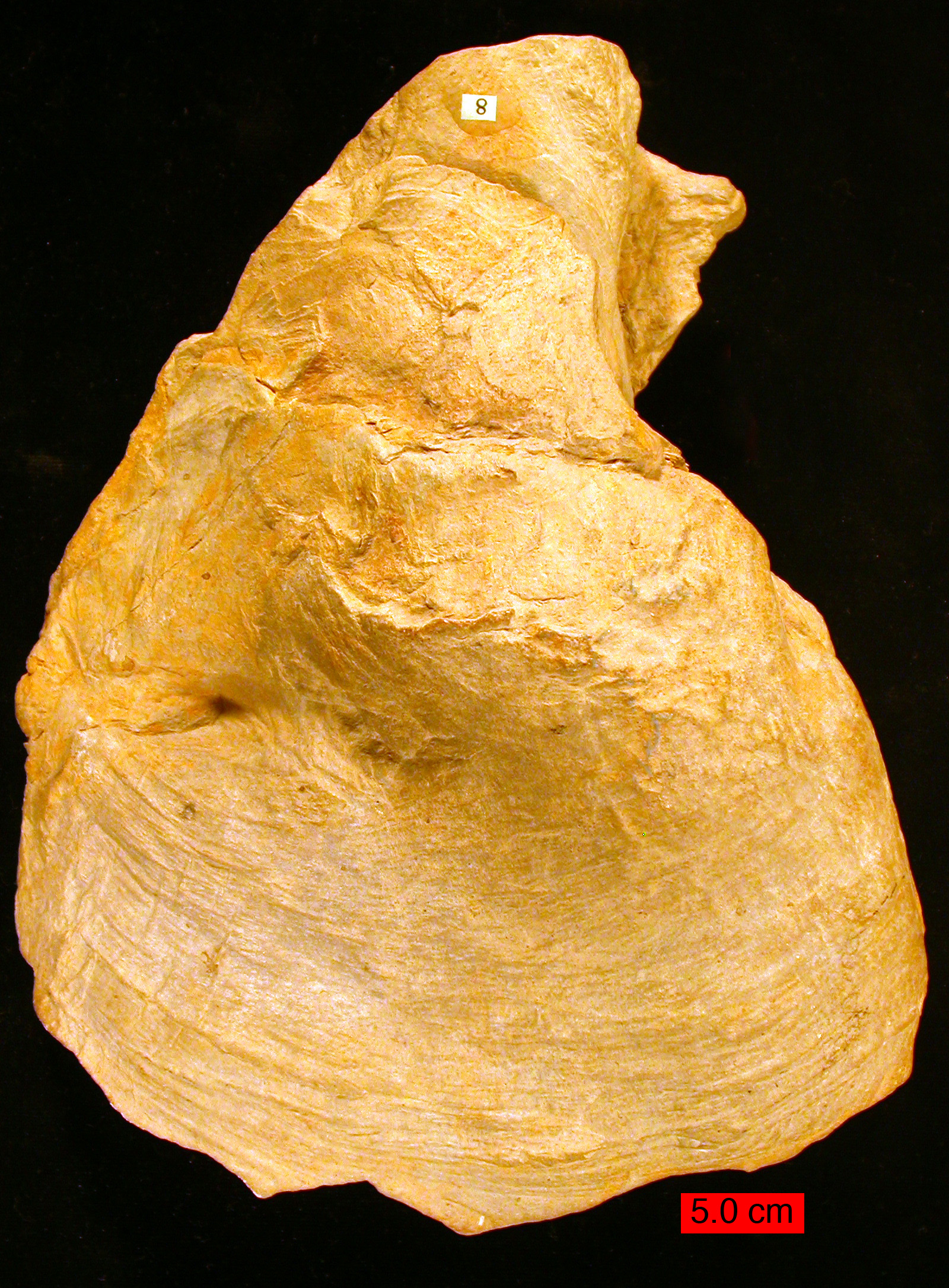
- Fossil of the feeding trace ichnogenus Zoophycos
  †Zoophycos
- †Zostocrinus
  - †Zostocrinus ornatus
- †Zygobolba
  - †Zygobolba crta
  - †Zygobolba curta
  - †Zygobolba decora
  - †Zygobolba elongata – tentative report
  - †Zygobolba excavata
  - †Zygobolba inflata
  - †Zygobolba intermedia
  - †Zygobolba oblonga
  - †Zygobolba prolixa
  - †Zygobolba rectangula
  - †Zygobolba robusta
- †Zygobolbina
  - †Zygobolbina conradi
- †Zygosella
  - †Zygosella vallata – or unidentified comparable form
- †Zygospira
  - †Zygospira modesta
