= List of trilobite genera =

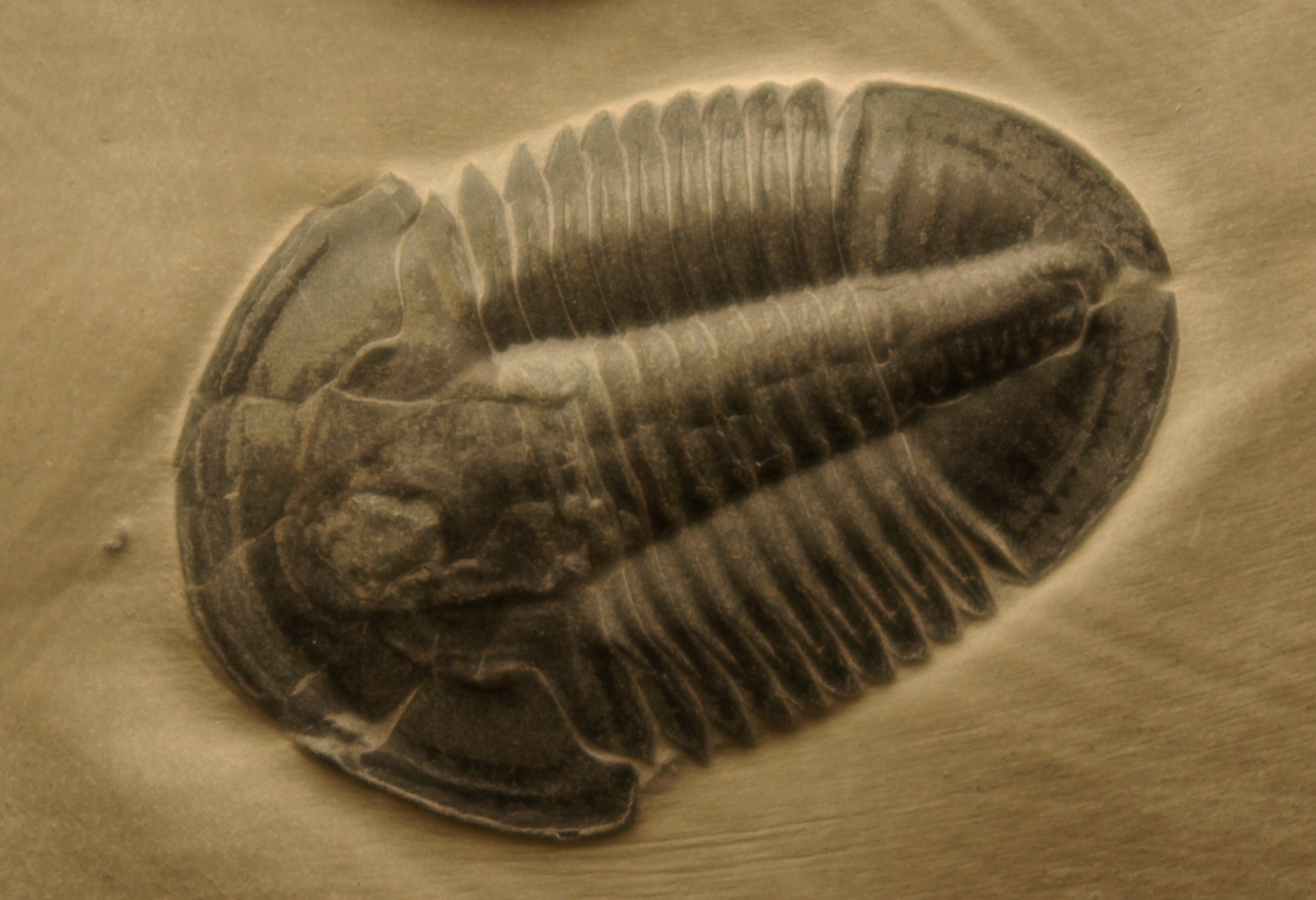
Asaphiscus wheeleri, a trilobite from the Cambrian Wheeler Shale of Utah

This list of trilobites is a comprehensive listing of all genera that have ever been included in the Arthropod class Trilobita, excluding purely vernacular terms. The list includes all commonly accepted genera, but also genera that are now considered invalid, doubtful (nomina dubia), or were not formally published (nomina nuda), as well as junior synonyms of more established names, and genera that are no longer considered trilobites.

== A ==
Contents:	A B C D E F G H I J K L M N O P Q R S T U V W X Y Z — See also

Contents:	Aa Ab Ac Ad Ae Af Ag Ai Aj Ak Al Am An Ao Ap Ar As At Au Av Aw Ay Az

=== Aa ===
- Aayemenaytcheia

=== Ab ===
- Abadiella (=Parabadiella; =Danagouia)
- Abakania
- Abakanopleura
- Abakolia (=Costadiscus)
- Abdulinaspis
- Abharella

=== Ac ===
- Acadolenus
- Acadoparadoxides (=Entomolithus; =Entomostracites; =Eoparadoxides)
- Acanthalomina
- Acanthocephalus (=Alomataspis)
- Acanthometopus
- Acanthomicmacca (=Chengkouia; =Jaskovitchella; =Myopsomicmacca)
- Acanthoparypha
- Acanthophillipsia
- Acanthopleurella
- Acanthopyge (=Euarges)
- Acastava
- Acaste
- Acastella
- Acastellina
- Acastocephala
- Acastoides
- Acastopyge
- Acernaspis (=Eskaspis; =Otadenus; =Murphycops)
- Acerocare
- Acerocarina (=Cyclognathus)
- Aceroproetus
- Achatella
- Acheilops
- Acheilus
- Achlysopsis
- Aciculolenus
- Acidaspidella
- Acidaspides
- Acidaspidina
- Acidaspis
- Acidiphorus (=Goniotelina; =Goniotelus; =Goniurus)
- Acidiscus
- Acimetopus
- Acmarhachis (=Cyclagnostus; =Oxyagnostus; =Wanagnostus)
- Acontheus (=Aneucanthus; =Aneuacanthus)
- Acrocephalaspina
- Acrocephalaspis
- Acrocephalella
- Acrocephalina
- Acrocephalinella
- Acrocephalites (=Acantholenus)
- Acrocephalops
- Acrodirotes
- Acropyge
- Actinopeltis
- Acuticryphops
- Acutimetopus

=== Ad ===
- Adastocephalum
- Adelogonus

=== Ae ===
- Aedotes
- Aegrotocatellus
- Aegunaspis
- Aethedionide
- Aethia
- Aethochuangia

=== Af ===
- Afghancephalites
- Afghanocare
- Afrops

=== Ag ===
- Agasella
- Agaso
- Agelagma (?=Paradistazeris)
- Agerina (=Otarionellina; =Otarionella)
- Agnostardis
- Agnostogonus
- Agnostotes
- Agnostus (=Battus; =Acutatagnostus)
- Agraulaeva
- Agraulos (=Arion; =Arionius; =Arionides; =Arionellus; =Agrauloides)
- Aguaraya
- Aguilarella
- Agyrenella

=== Ai ===
- Aiaiaspis
- Aidarella
- Aikhaliella
- Ainasuella
- Aistagnostus

=== Aj ===
- Ajacicrepida
- Ajrikina

=== Ak ===
- Akantharges
- Akbashichia
- Aksayaspis
- Aksuaspis
- Aktugaiella

=== Al ===
- Alacephalus
- Alanisia
- Alaskadiscus
- Alaskalethe
- Alataupleura
- Alataurus
- Albansia
- Albertella
- Albertellina
- Albertelloides (=Chuchiaspis)
- Alberticoryphe
- Alborsella
- Alceste
- Alcymene
- Aldanaspis
- Aldanianus (="Comptocephalus")
- Aldonaia
- Alekcinella
- Aligerites
- Allobodochus
- Alloillaenus
- Alloleiostegium
- Allolichas
- Alokistocare (=Pseudoalokistocare)
- Alokistocarella
- Alokistocaropsis
- Altaepeltis
- Altaesajania
- Altaiaspis
- Altajaspis
- Altikolia
- Altiocculus
- Altiplanelaspis
- Altitudella
- Alueva
- Alwynulus

=== Am ===
- Amblycranium
- Ambonolium
- Amecephalina
- Amecephalites
- Amecephaloides
- Amecephalus (=Strotocephalus)
- Amechilus
- Ameropiltonia
- Ameura
- Amgaspidella
- Amgaspis
- Amginia
- Amginoerbia
- Amginouyia
- Amiaspis
- Amicus
- Ammagnostus (=Lispagnostus; =Agnostoglossa; =Tentagnostus)
- Amorphella
- Amphilichas (=Paralichas; =Platymetopus; =Acrolichas; =Kerakephalichas; =Tetralichas)
- Amphitryon (=Caphyra Barrande, 1846; =Brachypleura)
- Amphoriops
- Amphoton (=Eurodeois; =Amphotonella; =Paramphoton; =Sunia)
- Ampullatocephalina
- Ampulliglabella
- Ampyx (=Brachyampyx)
- Ampyxella
- Ampyxina
- Ampyxinella
- Ampyxoides
- Amquia
- Amzasskiella (=Triplacephalus)

=== An ===
- Anabaraceps
- Anabaraspis
- Anacaenaspis (=Bruxaspis)
- Anacheiruraspis
- Anacheirurus
- Anacopodia
- Analox
- Anambon
- Ananaspis
- Anapliomera
- Anasobella
- Anataphrus
- Anaximander
- Anchiopella
- Anchiopsis
- Ancyginaspis
- Ancyropyge
- Andalusiana
- Andegavia (=Sagittapeltis)
- Anderssonella (=Anderssonia)
- Andinacaste
- Andrarina (=Liostracus)
- Andreaspis
- Anebolithus
- Anecocephalus
- Anemocephalops
- Anemocephalus
- Angelina (=Keidelaspis)
- Anglagnostus
- Anglibole
- Angsiduoa
- Angulophacops
- Angustaeva
- Angustibole
- Angustolenellus
- Anhuiaspis
- Anisonotella
- Anisopyge
- Ankoura
- Annamitella (=Bathyuriscops; =Endoaspis; =Wutingia; =Proetiella; =Monella)
- Annamitia
- Anomocare
- Anomocarella (=Psilaspis; =Entorachis)
- Anomocarellius
- Anomocarina
- Anomocarioides
- Anomocariopsis
- Anopocodia
- Anopolenus
- Anoria
- Antagmella
- Antagmopleura (=Poljakovia)
- Antagmus
- Antatlasia
- Anthracopeltis
- Anujaspis
- Anuloides

=== Ao ===
- Aocaspis
- Aotiaspis

=== Ap ===
- Apachia (=Apachilites)
- Apatokephalina
- Apatokephaloides
- Apatokephalops (=Aristokainella; =Wanliangtingia)
- Apatokephalus
- Apatolichas
- Aphelaspidella
- Aphelaspis (=Proaulacopleura; =Clevelandella; =Labiostria)
- Apheloides
- Aphelotoxon (=Ponumia)
- Apianurus
- Apiflabellum
- Aplexura
- Apocalymene
- Apollonaspis
- Apomodocia
- Aponileus
- Apoplanias
- Appendicysta
- Aprathia

=== Ar ===
- Araeocephalus
- Aragotus
- Araiocaris
- Araiopleura
- Arapahoia (=Hesperaspis)
- Arator
- Arcadiaspis
- Archaeagnostus
- Archaeaspis
- Archaeocoryphe
- Archaeopleura
- Archaeuloma
- Archegonus (=Cylindraspis)
- Archikainella
- Arcifimbria
- Arcticalymene
- Arcticeraurinella
- Arctinurus (=Oncholichas; =Platynotus; =Pterolichas)
- Arctipeltis
- Arcuolenellus
- Arcuolimbus
- Arduennella
- Arduennops
- Areia
- Areiaspis
- Arellanella
- Argasalina
- Argentopyge
- Arglina
- Argunaspis
- Armagnostus
- Armorigreenops
- Arraphus
- Arrhenaspis
- Arthricocephalus (=Arthricocephalites; =Protoryctocara; =Oryctocarella)
- Artokephalus

=== As ===
- Asaphellina
- Asaphellus (=Asaphelloides; =Asaphoon; =Hemigyraspis; =Megalaspidella; =Plesiomegalaspis)
- Asaphiscus
- Asaphopsis
- Asaphopsoides (=Dainellicauda; =Xiangxiia)
- Asaphus (=Schizophorus)
- Ascetopeltis
- Ascionepea
- Asiagena
- Asiatella
- Asilluchus
- Asiocephalus
- Asperocare
- Aspidaeglina
- Aspidagnostus (=Biragnostus)
- Aspidochuangia
- Asteropyge
- Astenaspis
- Asthenopsis
- Astroproetus (=Clypoproetus; =Enodiproetus; =Sibiroproetus)
- Asturiaspis
- Astycoryphe

=== At ===
- Atdabanella
- Athabaskia
- Athabaskiella
- Atilayus (="Deltocephalus")
- Atopasaphus
- Atopiaspis
- Atopina
- Atopophacops
- Atops (=Ivshiniellus)
- Atractocybeloides
- Atractopyge (=Cybelella)
- Atratebia
- Atypicus

=== Au ===
- Aulacodigma
- Aulacoparia
- Aulacoparina
- Aulacopleura (=Arethusa; =Arethusina; =Paraaulacopleura)
- Aulacopleurina
- Aulacopleuroides
- Auricula
- Auritama
- Austinvillia
- Australaspis
- Australoacaste
- Australokaskia
- Australomyttonia
- Australops
- Australopyge
- Australoscutellum
- Australosutura
- Autoloxolichas

=== Av ===
- Avalanchurus
- Avalonia
- Avascutellum (=Ctenoscutellum; =Rutoscutellum)
- Avonina

=== Aw ===
- Awaria

=== Ay ===
- Aytounella

=== Az ===
- Azyptyx

== B ==
Contents:	A B C D E F G H I J K L M N O P Q R S T U V W X Y Z — See also

Contents:	Ba Be Bi Bl Bo Br Bu By

=== Ba ===
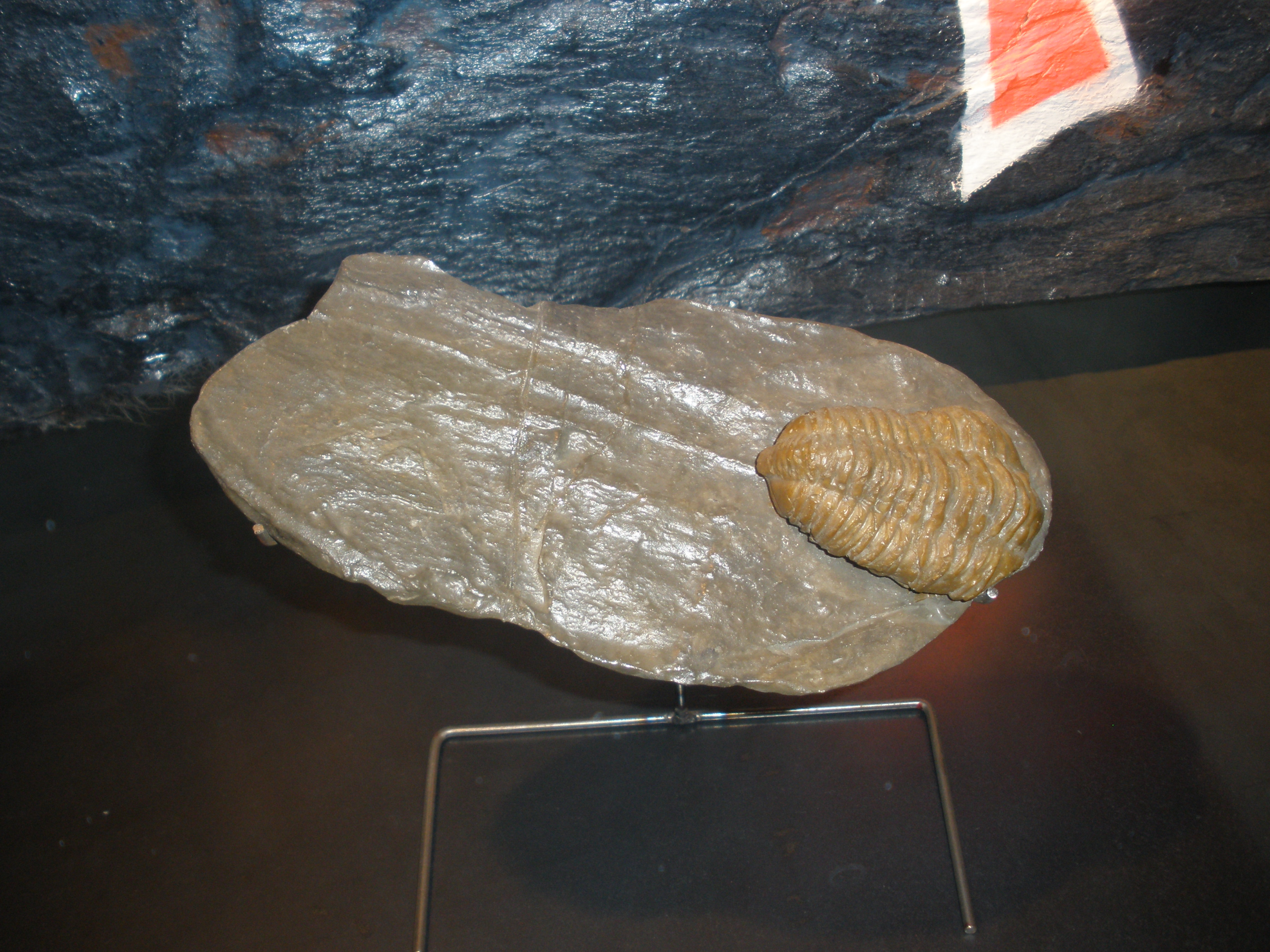
Bailiella levyi

- Babinops
- Badainjaranaspis
- Badulesia
- Bagongshania
- Bagradia
- Baikadamaspis
- Baikonuraspis
- Bailiaspis
- Bailiella (=Liaotungia; =Liocephalus; =Tangshihella)
- Bailielloides
- Bainella (=Paradalmanites; =Paranacaste)
- Bajanaspis
- Bajangoliaspis
- Balangcunaspis
- Balangia
- Balcoracania
- Balderia
- Balizoma
- Balnibarbi
- Baltagnostus (?=Trilagnostus)
- Baltiites
- Baltobergstroemia
- Baltoparadoxides
- Bancroftolithus
- Bandalaspis
- Baniaspis
- Banilatites
- Banqiaoites
- Baoshanaspis
- Bapingaspis
- Barklyella
- Barrandeopeltis
- Barrandia
- Basanellus
- Bashania
- Basidechenella
- Basilicus (=Basiliella; =Carinobasiliella; =Dolerobasilicus; =Basilicoides; =Mekynophrys; =Parabasilicus)
- Basocephalus
- Batenoides
- Bathycheilus (=Parabathycheilus)
- Bathydiscus
- Bathyholcus
- Bathynotellus
- Bathynotus (=Pagura)
- Bathyocos
- Bathyurellus
- Bathyuriscellus
- Bathyuriscidella
- Bathyuriscopsis
- Bathyuriscus (=Orria; =Orriella; =Wenkchemnia)
- Bathyurus
- Batocara (=Australurus)
- Bavarilla
- Bayfieldia

=== Be ===
- Bedicella
- Beggaspis
- Beigongia
- Beikuangaspis
- Beishanella
- Beldirella
- Beleckella
- Belenops
- Belenopyge (=Lobopyge)
- Belgibole
- Bellacartwrightia
- Bellaspidella
- Bellaspis
- Bellefontia
- Belliceps
- Belovia
- Benedettia
- Benesovella
- Benthamaspis (=Oculomagnus)
- Benxiella
- Beothuckia
- Berabichia
- Bergamia (=Bohemaspis; =Brandysops; =Cochliorrhoe)
- Bergerolimbus
- Bergeroniaspis
- Bergeroniellus
- Bergeronites (=Spinopanura)
- Berkeia
- Berkutaspis
- Bessazoon
- Bestjubella
- Bettonolithus
- Bevanopsis

=== Bi ===
- Biaverta
- Bicella
- Biceratops
- Biciragnostus
- Bidjinella
- Bienella
- Bienvillia (=Diatemnus; =Mendoparabolina)
- Bifodina
- Bigotina
- Bigotinella
- Bigotinops
- Bigranulella
- Bijaspis
- Bijelina
- Bilacunaspis
- Bilimbataia
- Billevittia
- Billingsaspis
- Binella
- Binervus
- Binodaspis (=Xilingxia)
- Birmanitella
- Birmanites (=Opsimasaphus)
- Bitumulina

=== Bl ===
- Blackwelderia (=Parablackwelderia)
- Blackwelderioides
- Blainia
- Blainiopsis
- Blandiaspis
- Blandicephalus
- Blanodalmanites
- Blayacina
- Blodgettia
- Blosyropsis
- Blountia (=Homodictya; =Protillaenus; =Stenocombus)
- Blountiella
- Blountina
- Blystagnostus

=== Bo ===
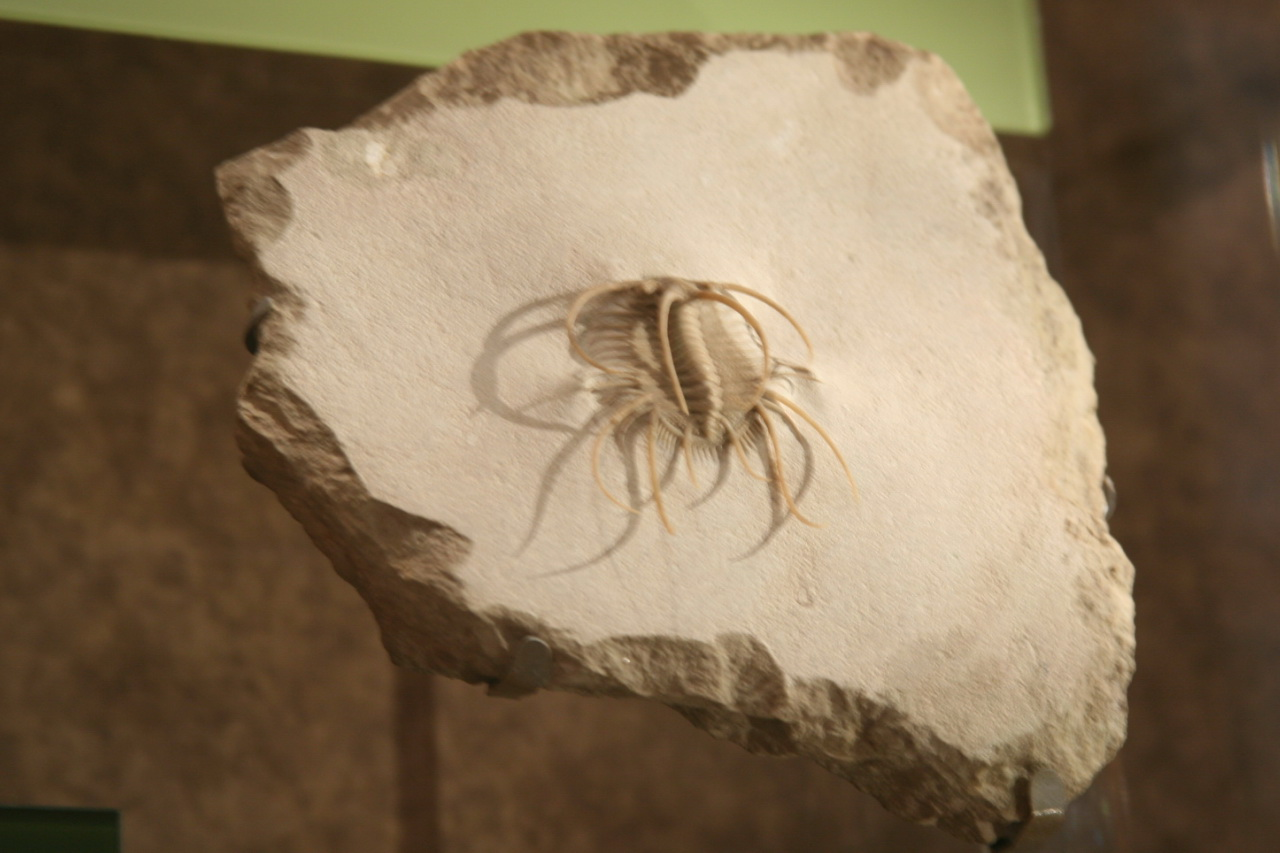
Boedaspis ensifer

- Boeckaspis (=Boeckia; =Sphaerophthalmella)
- Boeckops
- Boedaspis
- Boestrupia
- Bohemilla
- Bohemiproetus
- Bohemoharpes (=Declivoharpes; =Unguloharpes)
- Bohemopyge
- Bojocoryphe
- Bojoscutellum (=Holomeris)
- Bolaspidaspis
- Bolaspidella (=Deissella; =Howellaspis)
- Bolaspidellus
- Bolaspidina
- Bolaspis
- Bolbocephalus
- Bolbochasmops
- Bolbolenellus
- Bolboparia
- Bolivicrania
- Boliviproetus
- Bollandia
- Bondarevites
- Bondonella
- Bonnaria
- Bonnaspidella
- Bonnaspis
- Bonneterrina (=Holstonia; =Piedmontia)
- Bonnia
- Bonniella
- Bonnima
- Bonnioides
- Bonniopsis
- Borealarges
- Borealaspis (=Alreboaspis)
- Borealia
- Boreoscutellum
- Borkopleura
- Bornemannaspis
- Bornholmaspis
- Borogothus
- Borovikovia
- Borthaspidella
- Boschchekulia
- Botomella (=Sayanella)
- Botrioides
- Bouleia (=Dereimsia)
- Bowmania

=== Br ===
- Brabbia
- Brachyaspidion (=Brachyaspis)
- Brachyaspis
- Brachyhipposiderus
- Brachymetopella
- Brachymetopus (=Brachymetopina; =Iriania)
- Brackebuschia (=Bodenbenderia; =Hexianella)
- Bradocryphaeus
- Bradyfallotaspis
- Braintreella
- Branisaspis
- Braunops
- Breizhops
- Brevibole
- Breviphillipsia
- Breviredlichia
- Breviscutellum
- Brevitermierella (=Paratermierella)
- Brianurus (=Briania)
- Bridgeia
- Briscoia
- Bristolia
- Broeggerolithus (=Ulricholithus)
- Bromella
- Brongniartella (=Pamirotellus; =Portaginus)
- Bronteopsis (=Homoglossa)
- Brontocephalina
- Brontocephalus
- Brunswickia
- Brutaspis
- Brutonaspis
- Brutonia

=== Bu ===
- Bubupeltina
- Buchiproetus
- Buenaspis
- Buenellus
- Bufoceraurus
- Buitella
- Bulaiaspis
- Bulbaspis
- Bulbolenus
- Bulkuraspis
- Bumastella
- Bumastides
- Bumastoides
- Bumastus
- Burgesina
- Burlingia
- Burmeisterella
- Burmeisteria
- Burminresia
- Burnetiella (=Burnetia)
- Burtonops
- Buttsia
- Buttsiella
- Butyrinia

=== By ===
- Bynumia
- Bynumina
- Bythicheilus

== C ==
Contents:	A B C D E F G H I J K L M N O P Q R S T U V W X Y Z — See also

Contents:	Ca Ce Ch Ci Cl Cn Co Cr Ct Cu Cy

=== Ca ===
- Caborcella
- Caganaspis
- Cainatops (=Cornucoryphe)
- Calipernurus
- Callaspis
- Callavia (=Cephalacanthus; =Callavalonia; =Cobboldus)
- Callidaspina
- Callidaspis
- Calliops
- Calmonia
- Calocephalites
- Calodiscus (=Goniodiscus; =Brevidiscus)
- Calvinella
- Calvipelta
- Calybole
- Calycinoidia
- Calycoscutellum
- Calymene (=Calymena; =Calymaena; =Calymmene; =Calymmena)
- Calymenella
- Calymenesun
- Calymenia
- Calymenidius
- Calyptaulax (=Ligometopus; =Homalops)
- Camaraspis
- Camaraspoides
- Cambroinyoella
- Cambropallas
- Cambrophatictor
- Cambrunicornia
- Camsellia
- Cancapolia
- Canningella
- Canotaspis
- Canotiana (=Williamsina)
- Caputrotundum
- Carbonocoryphe
- Carbonoproetus
- Carinamala
- Carinocranium
- Carinopyge
- Carlopsia
- Carmon
- Carniphillipsia
- Carolinites (=Dimastocephalus; =Keidelia; =Tafnaspis)
- Catadoxides
- Cataplotaspis
- Catasolenopleura
- Cathayanella
- Catillicephala (=Cephalocoelia)
- Catillicephalites
- Catinouyia
- Catochia
- Catuniella
- Caulaspina
- Caulaspis
- Cavetia
- Cayastaia
- Cayupania
- Caznaia

=== Ce ===
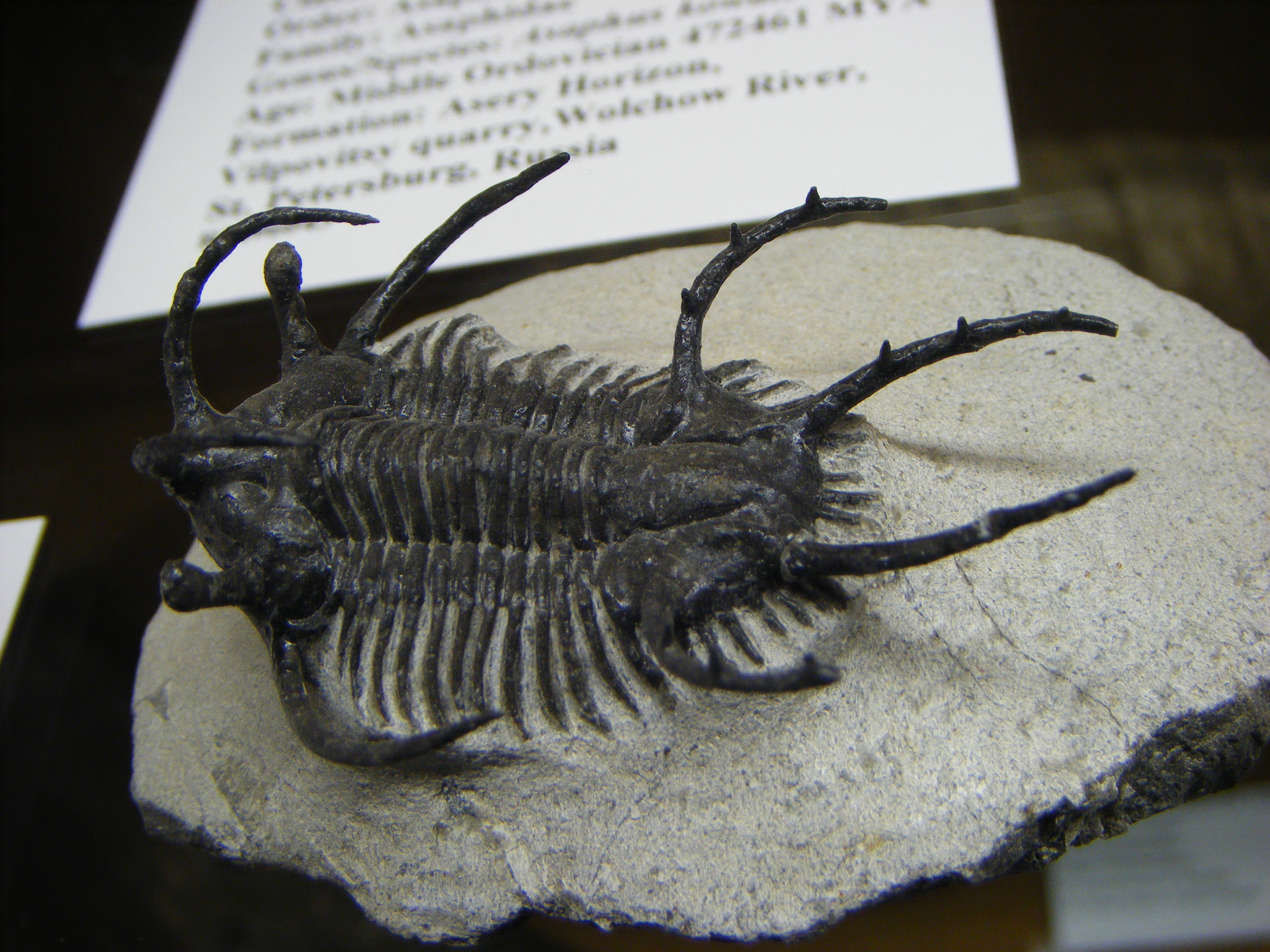
Ceratarges

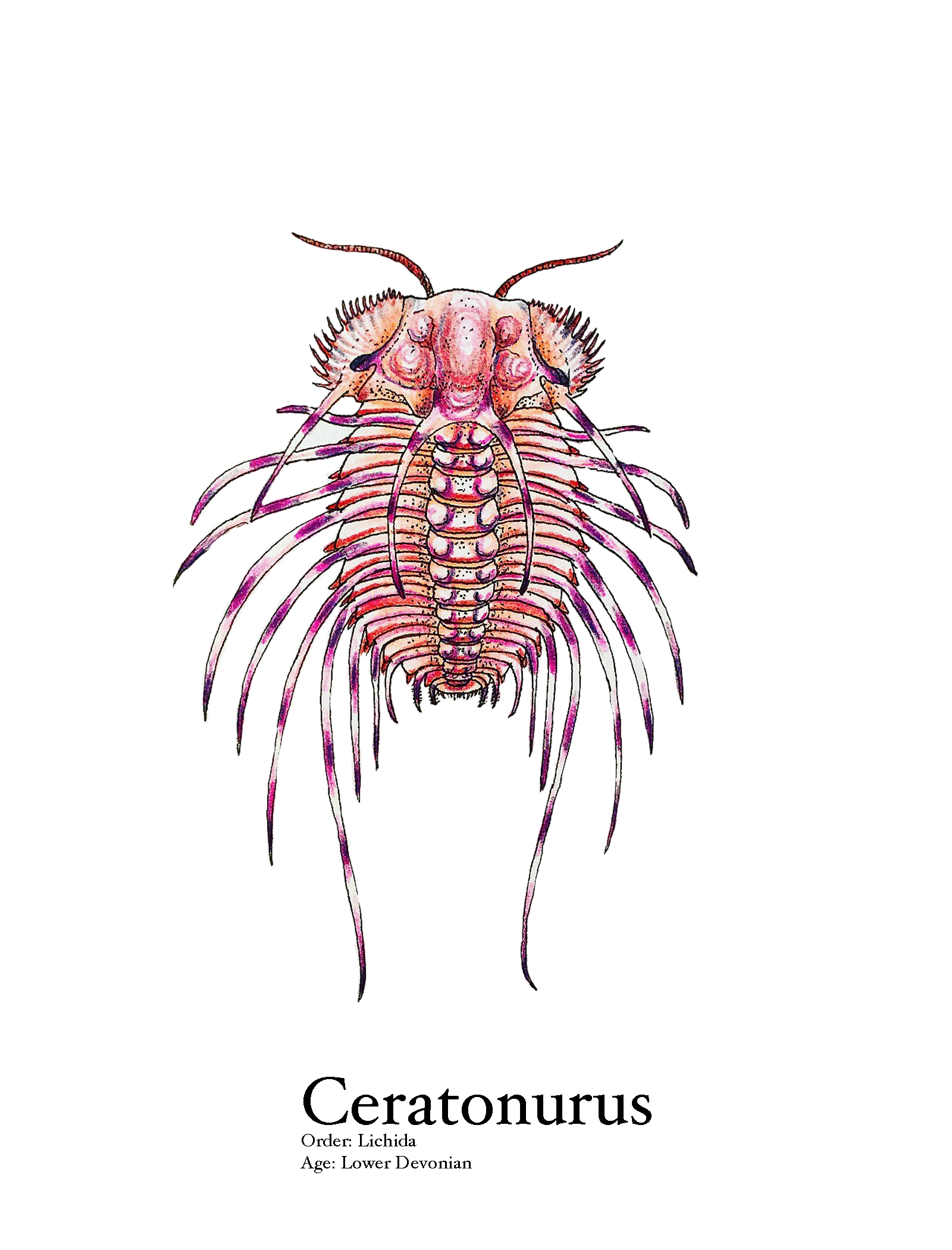
Ceratonurus

- Cedarapis
- Cedaria
- Cedarina
- Cekovia
- Celmus (=Crotalurus; =Ischyrophyma)
- Celtencrinurus
- Centauropyge
- Centonella
- Centriproetus
- Centropleura
- Cerampyx
- Ceratarges (=Arges)
- Ceratevenkaspis
- Ceratocara
- Ceratocephala (=Bounyongia; =Onchaspis)
- Ceratocephalina
- Ceratolichas
- Ceratonurus
- Ceratopeltis
- Ceratoproetus
- Ceratopyge
- Ceraurinella (=Bartoninus)
- Ceraurinium
- Ceraurinus (=Remipyga)
- Cerauromeros
- Cerauropeltis
- Ceraurus (=Eoceraurus)
- Cermataspis
- Cermatops
- Cernuolimbus
- Ceronocare

=== Ch ===
- Chacomurus
- Chakasskia
- Chakasskiella
- Chalchaquiana
- Chalfontia
- Chambersiellus
- Champlainia
- Chancia
- Chanciaopsis
- Changchowilla
- Changia (=Coreanocephalus; =Fengshania)
- Changqingia (=Austrosinia)
- Changshania (=Metachangshania; =Prochangshania)
- Changshanocephalus
- Changyangia
- Chaoaspis
- Charabaia
- Charaulaspis
- Charchaqia (=Aplotaspis)
- Chariocephalus
- Chashania
- Chasmops
- Chatiania (=Parachatiania)
- Chatkalagnostus (=Oculagnostus)
- Chattiaspis
- Chauffouraspis
- Chaunoproetoides
- Chaunoproetus (=Carnicia)
- Cheilocephalus (=Pseudolisania; =Zhalangtania)
- Cheiropyge (=Suturikephalion)
- Cheiruroides (=Inikanella)
- Cheirurus
- Chekiangaspis
- Chelediscus
- Chelidonocephalus
- Chencunia
- Chengjiangaspis
- Chengkouaspis
- Chengkouella
- Chengkouia
- Chengshanaspis
- Chiarumanipyge
- Chiawangella
- Chichikaspis
- Chiides
- Chilometopus
- Chilonorria
- Chimaerastella
- Chinghisicus
- Chiops
- Chiozoon
- Chishanheella
- Chittidilla (=Diandongaspidella; =Diandongaspis)
- Chlupacula
- Chlustinia
- Cholopilus
- Chomatopyge
- Chondagraulos
- Chondragraulina
- Chondranomocare
- Chondrastaulina
- Chondrinouvina
- Chondrinouyina
- Chondroparia
- Chorbusulina
- Chosenia (=Leiostegioides)
- Chotecops (=Cordapeltis)
- Choubertella
- Chuangia (=Schantungia; =Parachuangia; =Pterochuangia)
- Chuangiella
- Chuangina
- Chuangioides
- Chuangiopsis
- Chuangites
- Chuanqianoproetus
- Chugaevia
- Chulanolenus
- Chunghwaella
- Churkinia

=== Ci ===
- Cilia
- Ciliocephalus
- Ciliscutellum
- Cinnella
- Circulocrania
- Cirquella

=== Cl ===
- Clarella
- Clariondia
- Clarkeaspis
- Clavagnostus (=Tomorhachis; =Culipagnostus; =Stigmagnostus; =Acanthagnostus; =Leptagnostus; =Paraclavagnostus)
- Clavaspidella
- Clavatellus
- Clavibole
- Clavigellus
- Clelandia (=Harrisia; =Bynumiella)
- Clemenella
- Cliffia
- Cloacaspis

=== Cn ===
- Cnemidopyge

=== Co ===
- Cobboldites
- Coenaspis
- Coenaspoides
- Coephalocoeliaspis
- Coignops
- Colliceps
- Collis
- Colobinion
- Colossaspis
- Colpocoryphe (=Thoralocoryphe)
- Coltraneia
- Columbicephalus
- Comanchia
- Combewoodia
- Comluella
- Compsocephalus (=Lepidocephaloides)
- Comptonaspis
- Comura
- Conagraulos
- Conaspis
- Condylopyge (=Paragnostus; =Fallagnostus)
- Conicephalus
- Conimetopus
- Coniproetus
- Connagnostus
- Conococheaguea
- Conocoryphe (=Conocephalites; =Conocephalus; =Couloumania)
- Conoides
- Conokephalina (=Lobocephalina; =Ruzickaia; =Lobocephalus)
- Conolichas (=Cypholichas)
- Conomicmacca
- Conophillipsia
- Conophrys
- Conopolus
- Conoredlichia
- Constantina
- Constrictella
- Contracheirurus
- Coosella (=Wilsonella)
- Coosia
- Coosina
- Coosinoides
- Coplacoparia
- Corbinia
- Corcorania
- Cordania
- Coreolenus
- Cornuproetus
- Cornuscutellum
- Coronocephalus (=Coronocephalina; =Senticucullus)
- Coronura
- Corrugatagnostus (=Segmentagnostus; =Granulatagnostus; =Cenagnostus)
- Corycephalus
- Corynexochella
- Corynexochides
- Corynexochina
- Corynexochus (=Karlia)
- Costapyge
- Costonia
- Cotalagnostus
- Courtessolium

=== Cr ===
- Craigheadia
- Craspedarges
- Craspedops
- Crassibole
- Crassifimbra
- Crassiproetus
- Crepicephalina (=Mesocrepicephalus)
- Crepicephalus
- Crepichilella
- Criotypus
- Cristagnostus
- Crithias =Endogramma; =Enneacnemis; =Goniacanthus; =Micropyge; =Monadina; =Monadella; =Selenosema; =Staurogmus; =Tetracnemis)
- Croixana
- Cromus (=Encrinuraspis)
- Crossoura
- Crotalocephalides
- Crotalocephalina (=Gibbocephalus; =Mezocrotalus)
- Crotalocephalus (=Cerauroides; =Pilletopeltis; =Boeckia)
- Crozonaspis
- Crucicephalus
- Crusoia
- Crusoiina
- Cryphaeoides
- Cryphina
- Cryphops (=Gortania; =Microphthalmus)
- Cryptoderaspis
- Cryptolithoides
- Cryptolithus

=== Ct ===
- Ctenocephalus
- Ctenopyge

=== Cu ===
- Cuchulain
- Culmenaspis
- Cultrops
- Cummingella
- Curiaspis
- Curriella
- Curuyella
- Curvoryctocephalus
- Cuyanaspis

=== Cy ===
- Cyamella (=Cyamops; =Paracyamella)
- Cybantyx
- Cybele (=Cybelina)
- Cybellela
- Cybeloides
- Cybelopsis
- Cybelurus (=Miracybele)
- Cyclognathina
- Cyclolorenzella
- Cyclopyge (=Egle; =Aeglina)
- Cyphambon
- Cyphaspides
- Cyphaspis (=Novakaspis)
- Cyphinioides
- Cyphoniscus
- Cyphoproetus
- Cyrtodechenella
- Cyrtometopella
- Cyrtometopus
- Cyrtoproetus
- Cyrtoprora
- Cyrtosymbole
- Cyrtosymboloides
- Cystispina

== D ==
Contents:	A B C D E F G H I J K L M N O P Q R S T U V W X Y Z — See also

=== Da ===
- Dactylocephalus
- Daguinaspis (=Eodaguinaspis; =Epidaguinaspis)
- Daihuaia
- Dalarnepeltis
- Dalaspis
- Daldynaspis
- Daldynia
- Dalejeproetus
- Dalmanites (=Dalmania; =Guaranites; =Hausmannia; =Heliocephalus; =Makaspis; =Ommokris)
- Dalmanitina
- Dalmanitoides
- Dalmaniturus
- Damesella (=Haibowania; =Eodamesella)
- Damesops (=Meringaspis; =Paradamesops)
- Damiaoaspis
- Dananzhuangaspis
- Dananzhuangia
- Danarcus
- Danjiangella
- Danzhaiaspis
- Danzhaisaukia
- Daopingia
- Dartonaspis
- Dasometopus
- Datongites
- Datsonia
- Dawsonia (=Aculeodiscus; =Metadiscus)
- Dayinaspis
- Dayongia
- Daytonia
- Dazhuia

=== De ===
- Deacybele
- Deanaspis
- Deanokephalus
- Dechenella (=Eudechenella)
- Dechenelloides
- Dechenellurus
- Deckera
- Declivolithus
- Decordinaspis
- Decoroproetus (=Ogmocnemis; =Proetidella)
- Decoroscutellum
- Decus
- Degamella
- Deinoproetus
- Deiphon
- Deiracephalus (=Asteraspis)
- Deiradonyx
- Dekalymene
- Delagnostus
- Delamarina (=Delamarella)
- Delaria
- Delgadella (=Alemtejoia; =Delgadodiscus; =Delgadoia; =Pagetiellus; =Pentagonalia)
- Delgadoa
- Delinghaspis
- Dellea (=Eshelmania)
- Delleana
- Delocare
- Deloites
- Deloops
- Delops
- Deltacare
- Deltacephalaspis
- Deltadechenella
- Deltina
- Deltophthalmus
- Demeterops
- Demuma (=Pruvostina)
- Denagnostus
- Denaspis
- Denckmannites (=Denckmannia)
- Denella
- Denemarkia
- Densocephalus
- Dentaloscutellum
- Derikaspis
- Desmetia
- Desmus
- Despujolsia
- Destombesina
- Destombesites

=== Di ===
- Diabole
- Diacalymene
- Diacanthaspis
- Diacoryphe
- Diademaproetus
- Dianops
- Diaoyaspis
- Diaphanometopus
- Dicanthopyge
- Diceratocephalina
- Diceratocephalus
- Diceratopyge (=Paraceratopyge)
- Dicerodiscus
- Dichelepyge (=Bicornipyge)
- Dicranogmus
- Dicranopeltis (=Dicranopeltoides; =Nonix; =Raymondarges; =Trachylichas; =Tsunyilichas)
- Dicranurus
- Dictya
- Dictyella
- Dictyocephalites
- Didrepanon
- Didwudina
- Diemanosaukia
- Dienstina
- Dignaceps
- Dignagnostus
- Digonus
- Digrypos
- Dikella
- Dikelocephalioides
- Dikelocephalites
- Dikelocephalopsis
- Dikelocephalus
- Dikelokephalina
- Dikelus
- Dilatalimbus
- Dilataspis
- Dimeropyge (=Haploconus)
- Dimeropygiella
- Dindymene (=Cornovica)
- Dinesus
- Dingxiangaspis
- Dionide (=Dione; =Dionidepyga; =Trigrypos)
- Dionideina
- Dionidella
- Dipentaspis
- Dipharangus
- Dipharus
- Diplagnostus (=Enetagnostus; =Tasagnostus)
- Diplapatokephalus
- Dipleura
- Dipleuropyge
- Diplorrhina (=Mesospheniscus; =Quadragnostus; =Pseudoperonopsis)
- Diplozyga
- Dipyrgotes
- Dipyrogotes
- Discagnostus
- Dislobosaspis
- Distagnostus
- Distazeris
- Distyrax
- Ditomopyge (=Cyphinium; =Permoproetus; =Neophillipsia)
- Dividuagnostus (=Pezizopsis)
- Dixiphopyge

=== Dn ===
- Dnestrovites

=== Do ===
- Dokimocephalus
- Dolerolenus
- Dolerolichia
- Dolgaiella
- Dolgeuloma
- Dolichagnostus
- Dolichoharpes
- Dolicholeptus
- Dolichometopsis
- Dolichometopus
- Donggouia
- Doremataspis
- Doryagnostus (=Ceratagnostus; =Rhodotypiscus)
- Dorypygaspis
- Dorypyge
- Dorypygina
- Dorypygoides
- Doublatia
- Douposiella (=Tongshania)

=== Dr ===
- Drabia
- Drepanopyge
- Drepanuroides (=Xishuiella)
- Dresbachia
- Drevermannia
- Dreyfussina (=Prephacopidella)
- Drotops
- Drozdoviella
- Drumaspis

=== Du ===
- Duamsannella
- Dubhglasina (=Australoharpes; =Sinoharpes)
- Dubovikites
- Ductina
- Dudleyaspis
- Dudu
- Duftonia
- Duibianaspis
- Dulanaspis
- Dunderbergia
- Dunderburgella
- Dunopyge
- Duodingia
- Duplora
- Durinia
- Dushania
- Duyunaspis
- Duyunia

=== Dy ===
- Dysplanus
- Dytremacephalus

== E ==
Contents:	A B C D E F G H I J K L M N O P Q R S T U V W X Y Z — See also

Contents:	Eb Ec Ed Ei Ej Ek El Em En Eo Ep Er Es Et Eu Ev Ew Ex Ey Ez — See also

=== Eb ===
- Ebenezeria

=== Ec ===
- Eccoptochile
- Eccoptochiloides
- Echidnops
- Echinolichas
- Echinophacops
- Echinopyge
- Ectenaspis
- Ectenonotus
- Ectillaenus (=Wossekia)

=== Ed ===
- Edelsteinaspis
- Edgecombeaspis
- Edithiella
- Edmundsonia

=== Ef ===
- Effnaspis
- Effops
- Egyngolia (=Mongolodiscus)
- Ehmania
- Ehmaniella (=Anomalocephalus; =Clappaspis)

=== Ei ===
- Eifliarges
- Eilidh
- Eilura
- Eirelithus

=== Ej ===
- Ejinaspis
- Ejinoproetus

=== Ek ===
- Ekeraspis
- Ekwanoscutellum
- Ekwipagetia

=== El ===
- Elandaspis
- Elankaspis
- Elaphraella
- Elasmaspis
- Elatilimbus
- Elburgia
- Eldoradia
- Eldredgeia
- Eldredgeops
- Elegenodechenella
- Elegestina
- Eleutherocentrus
- Elganellus
- Elicicola
- Elimaproetus
- Elkia
- Ellesides
- Ellipsocephaloides
- Ellipsocephalus (=Germaropyge)
- Ellipsostrenua
- Ellipsotaphrus
- Ellipsuella
- Elliptocephala (=Georgiellus)
- Elliptophillipsia
- Ellsaspis
- Elongatanileus
- Elrathia
- Elrathiella (=Coelaspis; =Glossocoryphus)
- Elrathina
- Elsarella
- Elvinaspis
- Elvinia (=Moosia)
- Elviniella
- Elvinioides
- Elviraspis
- Elyaspis
- Elyx (=Eryx)

=== Em ===
- Emanuelaspis
- Emanuelina
- Emmrichops
- Emsurella
- Emsurina
- Emuella

=== En ===
- Enammocephalus
- Enantiaspis
- Encrinurella
- Encrinuroides
- Encrinuraspis
- Encrinurus (=Saoria)
- Endops
- Endymionia (=Endymion)
- Engelomorrisia (=Capricornia)
- Enixus (=Schistocephalus)
- Ensecoryphe
- Enshia
- Entomaspis (=Hypothetica)
- Entsyna
- Entsyna

=== Eo ===
- Eoacidaspis
- Eoagnostus
- Eoampyx
- Eoanomocarella
- Eoapatokephalus
- Eoasaphiscellus (=Eoasaphiscus)
- Eoasaphiscus
- Eoasaphus (=Anorina)
- Eobronteus
- Eocatuniella
- Eochatiana
- Eocheirurus
- Eochuangia
- Eocorynexochus
- Eocryphops
- Eoctenopyge
- Eocyphinium
- Eocyrtosymbole
- Eodalmanitina
- Eodindymene
- Eodiscus (=Deltadiscus)
- Eodontopleura
- Eodouposiella
- Eodrevermannia
- Eofallotaspis
- Eoharpes (=Harpina)
- Eohomalonotus (=Brongniartia)
- Eoinouyia
- Eoisotelus
- Eokaninia (=Kaniniella)
- Eokaolishania
- Eokaotaia
- Eokochaspis
- Eokosovopeltis (=Heptabronteus)
- Eoleonaspis (=Bojokoralaspis)
- Eolotagnostus
- Eomalungia
- Eomansuyia
- Eomicrophillipsia
- Eomonorachus
- Eopalpebralia
- Eophacops (=Bullicephalus)
- Eopharostoma
- Eopiriproetus
- Eoproetus
- Eops
- Eoptychaspis
- Eoredlichia (=Archaeops; =Galloredlichia; = Pararedlichia)
- Eorobergia
- Eoryctocephalus
- Eosaukia (=Scolosaukia)
- Eoscutellum
- Eoshengia (=Baojingia)
- Eoshumardia
- Eosoproetus
- Eosoptychoparia
- Eospencia
- Eotaitzuia
- Eotingocephalus
- Eotrinucleus
- Eowinterbergia
- Eowuhuia
- Eozacanthoides

=== Ep ===
- Epumeria

=== Er ===
- Erbenaspis
- Erbenia
- Erbenicoryphe
- Erbenites
- Erbenochile
- Erbia (=Paratollaspis)
- Erbiella
- Erbina
- Erbiopsidella
- Erbiopsis
- Erdelia
- Erdoradites
- Erediaspis
- Eremiproetus (=Dufresnoyiproetus)
- Erixanium
- Erkelina
- Ermanella
- Erratencrinurus
- Erratobalticus
- Erratojincella
- Erzishania (=Oreisator)

=== Es ===
- Eskoharpes
- Esseigania
- Estaingia (=Hsuaspis)
- Estoniites
- Estoniops

=== Et ===
- Eteraspis
- Etheridgaspis

=== Eu ===
- Euarthricocephalus
- Eudolatites
- Euduplora
- Eugonocare
- Eujinnania
- Euleiostegium
- Euloma (=Calymenopsis)
- Eulomella
- Eulomina
- Euonchonotina
- Euptychaspis
- Eurekia
- Eurostina
- Eurycare

=== Ev ===
- Evagena
- Evansaspis
- Evenkaspis
- Evropeites

=== Ew ===
- Ewacaste

=== Ex ===
- Exallaspis
- Exastipyx
- Excetra
- Exigua (=Brassicicephalus)
- Exochops
- Extrania

=== Ey ===
- Eymekops (=Kolpura)

=== Ez ===
- Ezhimia
- Ezhuangia

== F ==
Contents:	A B C D E F G H I J K L M N O P Q R S T U V W X Y Z — See also

=== Fa ===
- Fabulaspis
- Faciura
- Failleana (=Opsypharus)
- Falanaspis
- Fallotaspidella
- Fallotaspis
- Famatinolithus
- Fandianaspis
- Fastigaspis

=== Fe ===
- Feilongshania
- Feistia
- Fenestraspis
- Fengduia
- Fenghuangella (=Cyclolorenzellina)
- Fengtienia
- Fenniops
- Ferenepea
- Ferralsia
- Feruminops

=== Fi ===
- Fialoides
- Fieldaspis
- Finecrestia
- Fissanomocarella
- Fissocephalus

=== Fl ===
- Flabellocephalus
- Flectihystricurus
- Flexicalymene
- Flexidechenella
- Flexiscutellum

=== Fo ===
- Folliceps
- Forchammeria
- Fordaspis
- Forillonaria
- Formonia
- Formosocephalus
- Forteyops
- Foulonia
- Foveatella

=== Fr ===
- Fragiscutum
- Frammia
- Francenaspis
- Franconicabole
- Francovichia
- Fremontella
- Frencrinuroides
- Frithjofia
- Fritzolenellus
- Frognaspis

=== Fu ===
- Fuchouia (=Parafuchouia; =Pseudofuchouia)
- Fuminaspis
- Fuquania
- Furacopyge
- Furcalithus
- Furia
- Fuscinipyge
- Fuyunia
- Fuzhouwania

== G ==
Contents:	A B C D E F G H I J K L M N O P Q R S T U V W X Y Z — See also

=== Ga ===
- Gabriceraurus
- Gabriellus
- Galahetes
- Galbagnostus
- Galbertianus (="Hollardia")
- Galeaspis
- Galerosaukia
- Gallagnostus
- Gamonedaspis
- Gangdeeria
- Ganinella
- Ganovexopyge (=Scottia)
- Gaoloupingia
- Gaotanaspis
- Gaotania
- Gapeevella
- Gaphuraspis
- Garbiella
- Gaspelichas
- Gastropolus (=Lisogoraspis)

=== Gd ===
- Gdowia

=== Ge ===
- Gedongaspis
- Geesops
- Geigibole
- Gelasene
- Genalaticurus
- Genevievella (=Placosema; =Nixonella; =Torridella)
- Gentilapsis
- Georhithronella
- Geracephalina
- Geragnostella
- Geragnostus (=Geratrinodus; =Neptunagnostella)
- Geraldinella
- Gerasaphes
- Gerastos (=Dohmiella; =Kegeliella)
- Geyerorodes (=Orodes)

=== Gh ===
- Ghwaiella

=== Gi ===
- Gibscherella
- Gigantopygus
- Gignopeltis
- Gigoutella
- Giordanella
- Girandia
- Girvanopyge (=Cremastoglottos; =Gamops; =Nanlingia)
- Gitarra

=== Gl ===
- Glaberagnostus (=Toragnostus)
- Glabrella
- Glabretina
- Gladiatoria
- Glaphurella
- Glaphurina
- Glaphurus
- Glaphyraspis (=Raaschella)
- Globampyx
- Globoharpes
- Globulaspis
- Globusia
- Globusiella
- Globusoidea
- Gloria
- Glossicephalus
- Glossopleura (=Sonoraspis)
- Glyphanellus
- Glyphaspellus
- Glyphaspis (=Americare)
- Glyphopeltis
- Glyptagnostus (=Barrandagnostus)
- Glyptambon
- Glyptometopsis
- Glyptometopus

=== Go ===
- Gog
- Gogiura
- Gogoella
- Golasaphus
- Goldillaenoides
- Goldillaenus
- Gomiites
- Gondwanaspis
- Goniagnostus
- Gonicheirurus
- Goniophrys
- Gonioteloides
- Gonzaloia
- Gorskia
- Goumenzia
- Gourdonia
- Goycoia

=== Gr ===
- Gracemerea
- Gracilocoryphe
- Grandagnostus
- Grandioculus (=Honania)
- Granitzia
- Granolenus
- Granularaspis (=Granularia)
- Granuloagnostus
- Granutaspis
- Gratagnostus
- Gravicalymene
- Greenops
- Griffithidella
- Griffithides
- Grinnellaspis (=Actinopeltis)
- Griphasaphus
- Groenwallia
- Groenwallina
- Grossoproetus
- Gruetia

=== Gu ===
- Guancenshania
- Guandacolithus
- Guangnania
- Guangxiaspis
- Guangyuanaspis
- Guangyuania
- Guankouia
- Gudralisium
- Guichenia
- Guilinaspis
- Guizhouanomocare
- Guizhoucephalina
- Guizhouhystricurus
- Guizhoupliomerops
- Guluheia
- Gunnia (=Ellotia; =Yiliangaspis)
- Guohongjunia
- Guozia
- Guraspis
- Gushanaspis

=== Gy ===
- Gymnagnostus
- Gymnostomix
- Gyrometopus

== H ==
Contents:	A B C D E F G H I J K L M N O P Q R S T U V W X Y Z — See also

=== Ha ===
- Haasia (=Yuanjia)
- Habrocephalus
- Hadragnostus (=Formosagnostus; =Kunshanagnostus)
- Hadraspis
- Hadrocephalites
- Hadrohybus
- Hadrokraspedon
- Hadromeros
- Hadrorachus
- Hagiorites
- Hahnus (=Eometopus)
- Haliplanktos
- Hallandclarkeops
- Hallanta
- Hamashania
- Hamatolenus
- Hamiroproetus
- Hammannopyge
- Hamptonella
- Han
- Hanburia
- Hanchungolithus (=Ichangolithus; =Yinjiangolithus)
- Hancrania
- Hanivella
- Haniwa
- Haniwoides (=Yuepingia)
- Hanjiangaspis
- Hanshania
- Hanzhongaspis
- Hapalopleura
- Hapsiceraurus
- Hapsidocare
- Harataspis
- Hardyia
- Hardyoides (=Norwoodina)
- Harpes (=Helioharpes; =Reticuloharpes)
- Harpidella (=Rhinotarion)
- Harpides
- Harpidoides
- Harpillaenus
- Harringtonacaste
- Hartella
- Hartshillia
- Hartshillina
- Hassiabole
- Hastagnostus
- Hastiremopleurides
- Hatangia
- Hawkinsaspis (=Hawkinsia)
- Hawleia
- Hazarania

=== He ===
- Hebediscina (=Szechuanaspis; =Zhenbadiscus)
- Hebediscus
- Hebeia
- Hedinaspis
- Hedstroemia (=Milesdavis; =Pachyproetus)
- Hejinaspis
- Helepagetia
- Helieranella
- Heliomera
- Heliomeroides
- Helioproetus
- Heliopyge (=Alcaldops)
- Helmutia
- Helokybe
- Hemiarges (=Choneilobarges)
- Hemibarrandia
- Hemicricometopus
- Hemikaolishania
- Hemirhodon
- Henadoparia
- Hentigia
- Heraspis
- Hercantyx
- Herse
- Hesa
- Hesslerides
- Heterocaryon
- Heterocyclopyge (=Selenoptychus)
- Heukkyoella
- Hewenia
- Hexacopyge
- Hexacosta

=== Hi ===
- Hibbertia (=Harpesoides; =Metaharpes; =Paraharpes; =Thorslundops; =Wegelinia)
- Hicksia
- Hidascutellum
- Highgatella
- Hildaphillipsia
- Hillyardina (=Metabowmania)
- Hindermeyeria
- Hintzecurus
- Hintzeia
- Hispaniaspis
- Histiomona

=== Ho ===
- Hoekaspiella
- Hoekaspis
- Hoffetella
- Holanshania
- Holasaphus
- Holcacephalus
- Holdenia (=Tiresias)
- Holia (=Ainoa)
- Hollardops (=Modellops; =Philipsmithiana)
- Holmdalia
- Holmia (=Esmeraldina)
- Holmiella
- Holocephalina (=Carausia)
- Holocephalites
- Holotrachelus
- Holoubkocheilus
- Holteria
- Holubaspis (=Holubia)
- Holyoakia
- Homagnostoides
- Homagnostus
- Homalonotus
- Homalopteon
- Homalopyge
- Homodictya
- Homolichas
- Honanaspis
- Hongjunshaoia
- Hongshiyanaspis
- Hoplolichas (=Cyranolichas)
- Hoplolichoides
- Horbusonia
- Horonastes
- Houmaia
- Houmengia
- Housia (=Housiella)
- Howelluella
- Hoytaspis

=== Hs ===
- Hsiaella
- Hsiaoshia
- Hsuchuangia

=== Hu ===
- Huaibeia
- Huainania
- Hualongella
- Hualongia
- Huamiaocephalus
- Huangnigangia
- Huangshiaspis
- Huaquinchaia
- Huayuania
- Huemacaspis
- Huenickenolithus
- Huilichia
- Hukasawaia
- Humaencrinuroides
- Humeia
- Humilogriffithides
- Hunanaspis
- Hunanocephalus
- Hunanolenus
- Hunanoproetus
- Hunanopyge
- Hundwarella (=Anomocaraspis)
- Hungaia (=Acrohybus)
- Hungioides (=Argentinops)
- Hunjiangaspis
- Hunjiangites
- Hunnebergia
- Huntoniatonia (=Huntonia)
- Huochengella
- Huochengia
- Hupeia
- Hupeolenus
- Hupetina
- Huzhuia

=== Hw ===
- Hwangjuella

=== Hy ===
- Hyboaspis
- Hydrocephalus (=Phlysacium; =Rejkocephalus)
- Hypagnostus (=Cyclopagnostus; =Breviagnostus; =Metahypagnostus)
- Hypaproetus
- Hyperbolochilus
- Hypermecaspis (=Spitsbergaspis)
- Hyperoparia
- Hypodicranotus
- Hypsipariops
- Hyrokybe (=Shiqiania)
- Hysterolenus (=Hectoria)
- Hysteropleura (=Apedopyanus)
- Hystricurus (=Vermilionites)

== I ==
Contents:	A B C D E F G H I J K L M N O P Q R S T U V W X Y Z — See also

=== Ib ===
- Iberocoryphe
- Ibexaspis
- Ibexicurus

=== Ic ===
- Ichangia

=== Id ===
- Idamea
- Iddingsia (=Plataspella)
- Ideria
- Idiomesus
- Idiorhapha
- Idioura
- Idolagnostus
- Iduia

=== Ig ===
- Igarkiella
- Iglesiella
- Ignoproetus
- Ignotogregatus

=== Ij ===
- Ijacephalus

=== Il ===
- Illaenoides
- Illaenopsis (=Eurymetopus; =Procephalops; =Rokycania; =Pseudobarrandia)
- Illaenoscutellum
- Illaenula
- Illaenurus
- Illaenus (=Cryptonymus; =Actinolobus; =Deucalion; =Svobodapeltis)
- Illtydaspis

=== In ===
- Incaia
- Indigestus (=Hybocephalus)
- Indiligens (=Hospes)
- Inella
- Inglefieldia
- Ingriops
- Iniospheniscus
- Iniotoma
- Inkouia (=Agalatus)
- Innitagnostus
- Inosacotes
- Inouyella
- Inouyia
- Inouyina
- Inouyops
- Inoyellaspis
- Interalia
- Interproetus

=== Io ===
- Iohomia
- Iolgia

=== Ir ===
- Iranaspidion
- Iranaspis
- Iranochresterius
- Iranochuangia
- Iranoleesia (=Irania; =Heyelingella)
- Irgitkhemia
- Irinia
- Irvingella (=Irvingellina; =Komaspis)
- Irvingelloides

=== Is ===
- Isabelinia
- Isalaux
- Isalauxina
- Isbergia
- Ischyrotoma
- Ishpella
- Isidreana
- Isidrella
- Isocolus (=Astyages)
- Isoprusia (=Mauraspis)
- Isotella
- Isoteloides
- Isotelus (=Homotelus)
- Issafeniella
- Isyrakella
- Isyrakopeltis

=== It ===
- Itagnostus
- Itcheriella
- Ithycephalus
- Ithyektyphus
- Itydeois
- Ityophorus

=== Iv ===
- Ivanopleura
- Iveria
- Ivshinagnostus
- Ivshinaspis

=== Iy ===
- Iyouella

=== Iz ===
- Izarnia

== J ==
Contents:	A B C D E F G H I J K L M N O P Q R S T U V W X Y Z — See also

=== Ja ===
- Jakutus
- Jangudaspis
- Janshinicus
- Japonoscutellum
- Jasmundia
- Jasperia

=== Je ===
- Jeffersonia (=Bathyurina)
- Jegorovaia (=Hermosella)
- Jenkinsonia
- Jessievillia

=== Ji ===
- Jiagouia
- Jialaopsis
- Jianchangia
- Jiangjunshania
- Jiangnania
- Jiangsuaspis
- Jiangsucephalus
- Jiangsuia
- Jiangxiaspis
- Jianxilithus
- Jiawangaspis
- Jiia
- Jimachongia
- Jimanomocare
- Jimaoshania
- Jimbokranion
- Jinanaspis
- Jincella
- Jingheella
- Jingxiania
- Jingyangia
- Jinia
- Jinshaella
- Jinxiaspis
- Jiubaspis
- Jiumenia
- Jiuquania
- Jiuxiella (=Miboshania)
- Jiwangshania
- Jixianaspis
- Jixianella (=Jixiania)

=== Jo ===
- Johntempleia
- Jonotus
- Josephulus
- Josina

=== Ju ===
- Jubileia
- Jucundaspis
- Judaiella
- Judomia
- Judomiella
- Jujuyaspis (=Alimbetaspis)
- Jujuyops
- Juliaspis
- Junggarella
- Juraspis
- Juriietella

== K ==
Contents:	A B C D E F G H I J K L M N O P Q R S T U V W X Y Z — See also

=== Ka ===
- Kabuqiia
- Kabutocrania
- Kadyella
- Kailia
- Kailiella
- Kainella
- Kainellina
- Kainelloides
- Kainisiliellina
- Kainops
- Kaipingella
- Kaltykelina
- Kameschkoviella
- Kaninia (=Kaniniella; =Dolgaia)
- Kaniniella
- Kanlingia
- Kannoriella
- Kanoshia
- Kaolishania
- Kaolishaniella
- Kaotaia
- Karagandoides
- Karataspis
- Karginella
- Karslanus (Ariaspis)
- Kasachstanaspis
- Kasachstania
- Kasatchaspis
- Kaskia
- Kassinius
- Kathleenella
- Kathrynia
- Kathwaia
- Katunia
- Katunicare
- Kaufmannella (=Kaufmannia)
- Kawina (=Cydonocephalus)
- Kazachius (="Elegantaspis")
- Kayseraspis
- Kayserops
- Kazelia (=Kazellina)

=== Ke ===
- Keeleaspis
- Keguqinia
- Keilapyge
- Keithia
- Keithiella
- Kendallina (=Kendallia)
- Kennacryphaeus
- Kepingaspis
- Kepisis
- Kepisis
- Kerfornella
- Kermanella
- Kerpenella
- Kettneraspis (=Grossia)
- Ketyna (=Kujandaspis)

=== Kh ===
- Khalfinella
- Kharausnurica

=== Ki ===
- Kielanella
- Kielania (=Lowtheria)
- Kijanella
- Kilmahogia
- Kindbladia
- Kinderlania
- Kingaspidoides (=Elatius)
- Kingaspis (=Mesetaia)
- Kingstonella
- Kingstonia (=Ucebia)
- Kingstonioides
- Kiowaia
- Kirengina
- Kirkdomina
- Kiskinella
- Kistocare
- Kitatella
- Kiyakius (="Pionaspis")

=== Kj ===
- Kjerulfia

=== Kl ===
- Klabavia
- Kleptothule
- Klimaxocephalus
- Klotziella
- Kloucekia

=== Kn ===
- Knechtelia

=== Ko ===
- Kobayashella
- Kobayashia
- Kobayashipeltis
- Kobdus
- Kochaspis
- Kochiella (=Eiffelaspis)
- Kochiellina
- Kochina
- Kodymaspis
- Kogenium
- Koksorenus
- Kokuria
- Kolbaspis
- Kolbinella
- Koldinia
- Koldiniella
- Koldinioidia (=Akoldinioidia)
- Kolihapeltis
- Kollarcephalus
- Kolpura
- Kolymella
- Kolymoproetus
- Komaspidella (=Buttsina; =Ataktaspis)
- Komaspis
- Koneprusia
- Koneprusites
- Kontrastina
- Kootenia (=Notasaphus)
- Kooteniella (=Babakovia)
- Kooteniellina
- Kootenina
- Koptura (=Parakoptura)
- Kopungiella
- Koraipsis
- Kormagnostus (=Kormagnostella; =Litagnostoides)
- Korobovia
- Kosovopeltis (=Heptabronteus)
- Kosovoproetus
- Kotuia
- Kotysopeltis
- Kounamkites
- Kozlowskiaspis

=== Kr ===
- Krambedrysia
- Krattaspis
- Krohbole
- Krolina

=== Kt ===
- Ktenoura

=== Ku ===
- Kuanyangia
- Kueichowia
- Kujandina
- Kuljumbina
- Kulmiella
- Kulmogriffithides
- Kunmingaspis (=Benxiaspis)
- Kunshanaspis
- Kuraspis
- Kuraspoides
- Kuruktagaspis
- Kutsingocephalus

=== Kw ===
- Kweichowilla

=== Ky ===
- Kymagnostus
- Kymataspis
- Kyphocephalus

== L ==
Contents:	A B C D E F G H I J K L M N O P Q R S T U V W X Y Z — See also

=== La ===
- Labiostrella
- Labiostrina (=Abia)
- Labradoria (=Sinolenus)
- Labradorina
- Lachnostoma
- Lacorsalina
- Lacunoporaspis
- Laethoprusia
- Laevibole
- Lajishanaspis
- Lakaspis
- Lamanskytes
- Laminurus
- Lamproscutellum
- Lancastria (=Changaspis; =Chienaspis; =Goldfieldia; =Paraoryctocephalops; =Pseudolancastria)
- Landyia
- Laneites
- Langgonbole
- Langgonia
- Langqia
- Langyashania
- Laoyingshania
- Lapidaria
- Lardeuxia
- Larifugula
- Lasaguaditas
- Lasarchopyge
- Lashushania
- Latecephalus
- Lateuloma
- Latibole
- Laticephalus
- Laticoryphe
- Latiglobusia
- Latikingaspis
- Latilorenzella (=Wuania)
- Latipalaeolenus
- Latiproetus
- Latiredlichia
- Latouchia
- Latuzella
- Lauchellum
- Laudonia
- Lauzonella
- Lavadamia
- Lazarenkiura

=== Le ===
- Lecanoaspis
- Lecanopleura
- Lecanopyge
- Lehua
- Leiagnostus (=Ciceragnostus)
- Leiaspis
- Leichneyella
- Leichuangia
- Leimitzia
- Leiobienvillia
- Leiocoryphe
- Leiolichas
- Leioscutellum
- Leioshumardia
- Leiostegina
- Leiostegium (=Endocrania)
- Leiostrototropis
- Lejopyge
- Lemdadella
- Lenacare
- Lenadiscus
- Lenagraulos
- Lenallina
- Lenaspis
- Leningradites
- Leocephalus
- Leoforteyia
- Leonaspis (=Acanthaloma)
- Lepidoproetus
- Leptochilodiscus (=Kerberodiscus)
- Leptochuangia
- Leptopilus
- Leptoplastides (=Andesaspis; =Beltella; =Chunkingaspis; =Parabolinopsis; =Rampartaspis)
- Leptoplastus
- Leptoredlichia (=Paraleptoredlichia)
- Lermontovia
- Lermontoviella
- Letniites
- Leurostega
- Leviceraurus
- Levinia
- Levisaspis
- Levisella
- Levisia

=== Li ===
- Lianglangshania
- Liangshanocephalus
- Lianhuashania
- Liaoningaspis
- Liaoningella
- Liaotropis
- Liaoyangaspis
- Libertella
- Lichakephalina
- Lichakephalus
- Lichanocoryphe
- Lichapyge (=Macropygella)
- Lichas (=Apolichas; =Autolichas)
- Lichengaspis
- Lichengia
- Licnocephala (=Domina)
- Liexiaspis
- Ligiscus
- Limataceps
- Limbadiscus (=Natalina)
- Limbocalymene
- Limniphacos
- Limouolenus
- Limpeina
- Linguagnostus (=Cristagnostus)
- Linguaphillipsia
- Linguaproetus
- Linguchuangia
- Linguisaukia
- Lingukainella
- Linguocalymene
- Lingyuanaspis
- Liobole
- Liobolina
- Liocalymene
- Liocare
- Liocnemis
- Lioharpes (=Fritchaspis)
- Liokootenia
- Liolalax (=Lalax)
- Liolophops
- Liomegalaspides
- Lioparella (=Zhuozishania)
- Lioparia (=Lorentzia)
- Liopeishania
- Liopelta
- Liosolenopleura
- Liostracina
- Liquania
- Liriamnica
- Lisania (=Aojia)
- Lisogoragnostus (=Abagnostus; =Scanagnostus)
- Lisogorites (=Trigonoaspis; =Tangyaia)
- Listroa
- Litaspis
- Litavkaspis
- Litocephalus
- Litomatopus
- Litometopus
- Litotix
- Liuheaspis
- Liushuicephalus
- Liwia (=Livia)

=== Ll ===
- Llandovacaste
- Llanoaspidella
- Llanoaspis
- Lloydia
- Lloydolithus

=== Lo ===
- Lochkovella
- Lochmanaspis
- Lochmanolenellus
- Lodenicia
- Loeipyge
- Loganellus (=Highgatea)
- Loganopeltis
- Loganopeltoides
- Lohanpopsis
- Lomsucaspis
- Lonchinouyia
- Lonchobasilicus (=Sinomegalaspis)
- Lonchocephalus (=Bucksella)
- Lonchodomas
- Lonchopygella
- Longduia
- Longianda
- Longicoryphe
- Longilobus
- Longiproetus
- Longlingaspis
- Longmenshania
- Longshania
- Longxianaspis
- Longxumenia
- Loparella
- Lopeuloma
- Lophiokephalion
- Lophodesella
- Lophoholcus
- Lophosaukia
- Lopnorites
- Lordshillia
- Lorensella
- Lorenzella
- Loriella
- Lorrettina
- Loshanella
- Lotagnostus
- Lotosoides
- Lotzeia
- Loulania
- Loxonepea
- Loxoparia
- Loxopeltis

=== Lu ===
- Luaspides
- Luaspis
- Lugalella
- Luguoia
- Luhops
- Luia
- Luliangshanaspis
- Lulongia
- Lunacephalus
- Lunacrania (=Paranumia)
- Lunolenus
- Luojiashania
- Luonanocephalus
- Luotuolingia
- Lusampa
- Lusatiops (=Jalonella)
- Lutesvillia
- Luvsanodiscus
- Luxella
- Luyanhaoaspis (=Luaspis)
- Luyanhaoia

=== Ly ===
- Lycophron
- Lydiaspis
- Lygdozoon
- Lynaspis
- Lyralichas
- Lyrapyge
- Lyriaspis

== M ==
Contents:	A B C D E F G H I J K L M N O P Q R S T U V W X Y Z — See also

=== Ma ===
- Macannaia
- Macelloura
- Machairagnostus
- Mackenziurus
- Macnairides
- Macroblepharum
- Macrobole
- Macrogrammus
- Macronoda (=Promesus)
- Macropyge (=Haniwapyge)
- Macrotoxus
- Madaoyuites
- Madaraspis
- Madarocephalus
- Madianaspis
- Maduiya
- Maghroharpes
- Magnacephalus
- Magnomma
- Mahaiella
- Maiaspis
- Majiangia
- Makbelaspis
- Maladia
- Maladioidella (=Kuruktagella; =Cedarellus)
- Maladioides
- Maladiopsis
- Malayaproetus
- Malchi
- Malimanaspis (=Goodsiraspis)
- Malinaspis
- Malladaia
- Mallagnostus (=Ladadiscus; ?=Jinghediscus)
- Malongocephalus
- Malongullia (=Ampyxinops)
- Malvinella
- Malvinocooperella
- Malykania
- Manailina
- Manaspis
- Manchuriella
- Manchurocephalus
- Manitouella
- Mannopyge
- Mansiella
- Mansuyella
- Mansuyia
- Mansuyites (=Parapalacorona)
- Mantoushania
- Manublesia
- Maopingaspis
- Maotunia
- Mapania
- Mapanopsis
- Marcaisia
- Marcouella
- Marekolithus
- Marjumia
- Markhaspis
- Marrolithoides
- Marrolithus
- Maryvillia
- Maspakites
- Matania
- Mataninella
- Maurotarion (=Goniopleura; =Branisella; =Tricornotarion)
- Maximovella
- Mayiella

=== Me ===
- Meadowtownella
- Mecophyrs
- Megadundabergia
- Megagnostus
- Megagraulos
- Megalaspidella
- Megalaspides (=Lannacus)
- Megalisania
- Megalopsis
- Megapalaeolenus
- Megapharanaspis
- Megaproetus
- Megasaphus
- Megatemnoura
- Megistaspidella (=Spinopyge)
- Megistaspis (=Megalaspis; =Megistaspinus; =Rhinaspis)
- Meisteraspis
- Meisterella
- Meitanella
- Meitania
- Meitanillaenus
- Meitanopsis
- Melopetasus
- Memmatella
- Mendodiscus
- Mendogaspis
- Mendolaspis
- Mendosina
- Mendospidella
- Meneghinella
- Meneviella (=Menevia)
- Mengzia
- Meniscocoryphe
- Meniscuchus
- Menneraspis
- Menocephalites (=Parataitzuia)
- Menocephalus
- Menomonia (=Densonella; =Millardia)
- Menoparia
- Menorcaspis
- Mephiarges
- Merebolina
- Meridioscutellum
- Merlinia
- Meropalla
- Meroperix
- Mesoctenopyge
- Mesolenellus
- Mesonacis (=Fremontia)
- Mesotaphraspis
- Metaacidaspis
- Metabalangia
- Metacalvinella
- Metacalymene
- Metacanthina
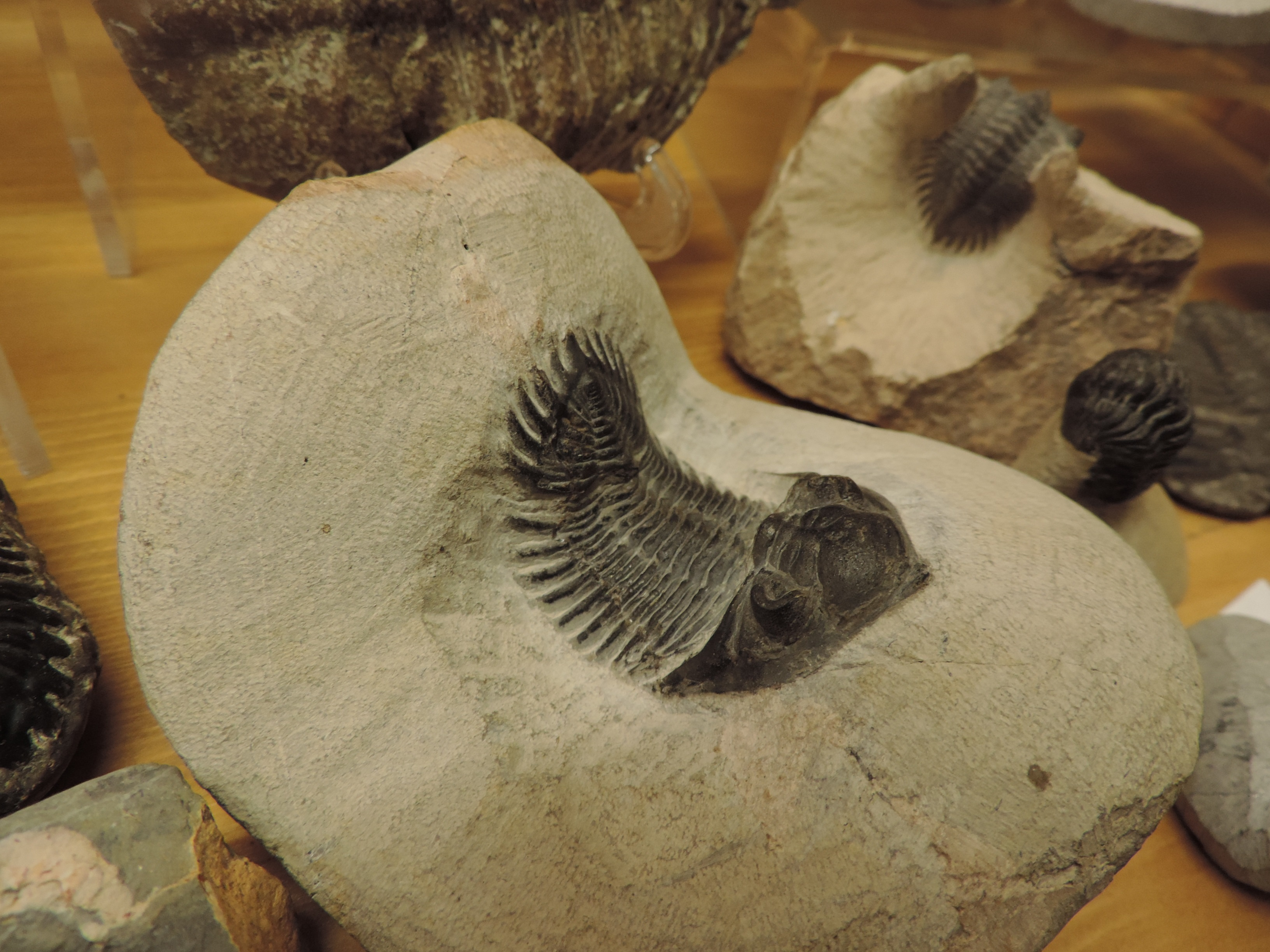
  Fossil of Metacanthina (Devonian, found in Morocco).
- Metacryphaeus
- Metadoxides (=Anadoxides)
- Metagraulos
- Metaharpides
- Metakootenia
- Metaleiolichas
- Metalichas
- Metalioparella
- Metalisania
- Metalonchodomas
- Metanomocare
- Metanomocarella
- Metaphillipsia
- Metapianaspis
- Metapilekia
- Metapliomerops
- Metaprodamesella
- Metaptychopyge
- Metaredlichia
- Metarthricocephalus
- Metascutellum
- Metashantungia
- Metayuepingia
- Meteoraspis (=Greylockia; =Coleopachys)
- Metisaspina
- Metisaspis
- Metisella
- Metopolichas (=Metopias; =Holoubkovia; =Macroterolichas)
- Metopotropis
- Mexicaspis
- Mexicella

=== Mi ===
- Miaeuloma
- Mial
- Mianxianella
- Miaobanpoia
- Miaopopsis
- Micagnostus
- Micangshania
- Michaspis
- Micmacca
- Micmaccopsis
- Micragnostus
- Micragraulos
- Microdiscus
- Microparia (=Gallagnostoides)
- Microphillipsia
- Microryctocara
- Microscutellum
- Microspatulina
- Mictosaukia
- Mictosaukioidia
- Milaspis
- Mimana
- Mimocryphaeus
- Mindycrusta
- Minicephalus
- Minkella
- Minupeltis
- Minusinella
- Mioptychopyge
- Mirabole
- Miraculaspis
- Miranda
- Miranella
- Miraspis (=Elbaspis)
- Miriproetus
- Mischynogorites
- Misszhouia
- Mitchellaspis (=Mitchellia)

=== Mo ===
- Modocia (=Armonia; =Metisia; =Perioura; =Semnocephalus)
- Mohicana
- Monanocephalus
- Monkaspis (=Kushanopyge; =Paraliaoningaspis)
- Monocheilus
- Monodechenella
- Monorakos
- Monosulcatina
- Mopanshania
- Moravocoryphe
- Morgatia
- Morocconites
- Morocconus (=Cephalopyge)
- Morosa
- Moschoglossis
- Moxomia

=== Mr ===
- Mrakibina
- Mrassina

=== Mu ===
- Muchattellina
- Mucronaspis (=Guaykinites)
- Mufushania
- Mukrania
- Mulciberaspis
- Mummaspis
- Mundocephalina
- Mungyongia
- Munija

=== My ===
- Myinda
- Myindella
- Myoproetus
- Myopsolenus (=Collyrolenus)
- Myopsostrenua
- Myrmecomimus
- Mystrocephala
- Mytocephala (=Mirops)
- Myttonia

== N ==
Contents:	A B C D E F G H I J K L M N O P Q R S T U V W X Y Z — See also

=== Na ===
- Nadiyella
- Nagaproetus
- Nahannagnostus
- Nahannia
- Nahannicephalus
- Namanoia
- Nambeetella
- Namiolenoides
- Namuraspis
- Namuropyge (=Coignouina)
- Nandanaspis
- Nangaocephalus
- Nangaoia
- Nangaops
- Nanillaenus
- Nankinolithus
- Nannopeltis
- Nanoqia
- Nanshanaspis
- Nanshihmenia
- Naraoia
- Narinosa
- Nasocephalus
- Nassovia
- Natmus
- Naustia

=== Ne ===
- Nebidella
- Nehanniaspis
- Neilsoniella
- Neimonggolaspis
- Nelegeria
- Nelgakia
- Neltneria
- Neoacrocephalites
- Neoanomocarella
- Neoasaphus (=Trematophoris; =Multiasaphus; =Postasaphus; =Subasaphus)
- Neobigotina
- Neoblairella (="Blairella")
- Neocalmonia
- Neocheiruroides
- Neochilonorria
- Neocobboldia (=Cobboldia; =Margodiscus)
- Neodamesella
- Neodrepanura (="Drepanura")
- Neoglaphyraspis
- Neograciella (="Graciella")
- Neogriffithides (=Siciliproetus)
- Neohedinaspis
- Neoiranella (="Iranella")
- Neokaskia
- Neokochina
- Neolenus
- Neolichas
- Neometacanthus
- Neoolenus
- Neopagetina (=Pagetina)
- Neoparabolina
- Neopeltis
- Neopoliellina
- Neoprobolium
- Neoprodamesella
- Neoproetus
- Neopsilocephalina
- Neoredlichia
- Neoredlichina
- Neoregina (="Regina")
- Neoscutellum
- Neoshirakiella
- Neosolenopleurella
- Neotaenicephalus
- Nepea
- Nephranomma
- Nephranops
- Nephrolenellus
- Nericella
- Nericia
- Nericiaspis
- Nerudaspis
- Neseuretinus
- Neseuretus (=Synhomalonotus)
- Nevadella
- Nevadia
- Nganasanella (=Tamaranella)

=== Ng ===
- Ngaricephalus

=== Ni ===
- Nicoljarvius
- Nidanshania
- Nieszkowskia
- Nilegna
- Nileoides
- Nileus (=Remopleuridioides)
- Ninadiscus
- Ninaspis
- Ningkianites
- Ningkianolithus (=Ceratolithus; =Hexianolithus)
- Ninglangia
- Ningnanaspis
- Ningqiangaspis
- Ningxiaspis
- Niobe
- Niobella (=Metoptogyrus)
- Niobides
- Niobina
- Nipponarges
- Nipponaspis
- Nipponocalymene
- Nitidocare
- Niuchangella

=== No ===
- Nobiliasaphus (=Pamirotchechites)
- Nodiceps
- Nodiphillipsia
- Noelaspis
- Nomadinis
- Norasaphites
- Norasaphus
- Nordia
- Norinia
- Norwoodella
- Norwoodia (=Whitfieldina)
- Notaiella
- Notoaphelaspis
- Notocoryphe
- Notopeltis
- Novakella (=Incisopyge)
- Novaspis
- Novoagnostus
- Novoameura
- Novocatharia (=Catharia)

=== Nu ===
- Nucleurus
- Nunnaspis

=== Ny ===
- Nyaya
- Nyterops

== O ==
Contents:	A B C D E F G H I J K L M N O P Q R S T U V W X Y Z — See also

=== Ob ===
- Obelagnostus
- Obliteraspis
- Obrucheviaspis

=== Oc ===
- Octillaenus
- Octobronteus (=Stoermeraspis; =Stoermeria)
- Oculeus
- Oculichasmops

=== Od ===
- Odontocephalus
- Odontochile (=Hausmannia)
- Odontopleura

=== Oe ===
- Oedicybele (=Dindymenella; =Jemtella)
- Oedorhachis
- Oehlertaspis (=Oehlertia)
- Oelandiops
- Oenonella

=== Og ===
- Ogmasaphus
- Ogyginus
- Ogygiocarella
- Ogygiocaris
- Ogygitella
- Ogygites
- Ogygitoides
- Ogygopsis (=Taxioura)

=== Oh ===
- Ohleum

=== Oi ===
- Oidalagnostus (=Ovalagnostus)
- Oidalaproetus
- Oinochoe
- Oirotella

=== Ok ===
- Okunevaella

=== Ol ===
- Olegaspis
- Olekmanellus
- Olekmaspis
- Olenaspella
- Olenekella
- Olenekina
- Olenelloides
- Olenellus (=Barrandia)
- Olenoides
- Olenoidestranans
- Olentella
- Olenus (=Simulolenus)
- Olgaspis
- Oligometopus (=Bernicella)
- Olimus
- Olinaspis

=== Om ===
- Omegops
- Omeipsis
- Omuliovia

=== On ===
- Onaraspis
- Oncagnostus (=Eurudagnostus)
- Onchocephalina
- Onchocephalites
- Onchocephalus (=Litocodia)
- Onchometopus
- Onchonotellus (=Onchonotina; =Guotangia; =Seletella)
- Onchonotopsis
- Onchonotus
- Onchopeltis
- Onnia
- Onnicalymene
- Ontoella
- Onychopyge (=Prionopyge)
- Onycopyge
- Onymagnostus (=Agnostonymus)

=== Oo ===
- Oodiscus
- Oopsites
- Oosthuizenella

=== Op ===
- Opipeuterella (=Ompheter; =Opipeuter)
- Opoa
- Opsidiscus (=Aulacodiscus)
- Opsiosoryctocephalus

=== Or ===
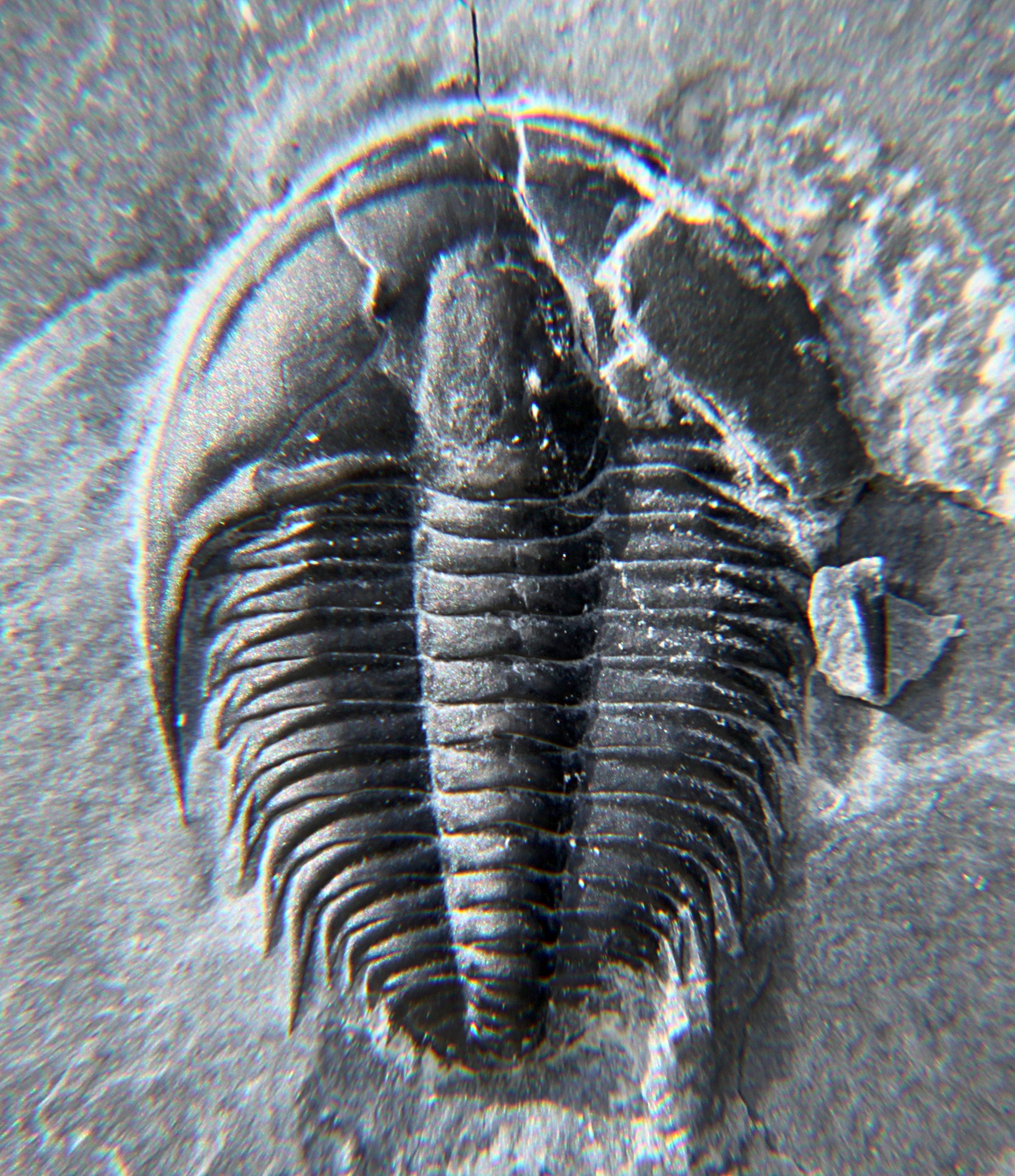
Orygmaspis contracta, Upper Cambrian

- Orbitoproetus
- Ordosaspis
- Ordosia
- Oreadella
- Orienturus
- Orkekeia
- Orlovia
- Orloviella
- Ormathops
- Ormistonaspis
- Ormistonia
- Ormistoniella
- Ornamentaspis
- Orometopus
- Orphanaspis
- Orthodorsum
- Oryctocara
- Oryctocephalina
- Oryctocephalites
- Oryctocephaloides
- Oryctocephalops
- Oryctocephalus (=Vinakainella)
- Oryctometopus
- Orygmaspis
- Orygmatos

=== Os ===
- Osceolia
- Osekaspis
- Osmolskia

=== Ot ===
- Otarion (=Aulacopleurella; =Conoparia; =Otarionella)
- Otarionides
- Otarozoum
- Otekmaspis
- Otodechenella
- Ottenbyaspis
- Ottoaspis

=== Ou ===
- Ouijjania
- Ourikaia

=== Ov ===
- Ovalocephalus (=Hammatocnemis; =Paratzuchiatocnemis)
- Ovatoryctocara

=== Ox ===
- Oxyagnostus

== P ==
Contents:	A B C D E F G H I J K L M N O P Q R S T U V W X Y Z — See also

=== Pa ===
- Pachyaspidella
- Pachyaspis
- Pachycranium
- Pachyredlichia
- Paciphacops
- Pacootella
- Paedeumias
- Paenebeltella
- Pagetia (=Eopagetia; =Mesopagetia)
- Pagetides (=Discomesites)
- Pagodia
- Pagodioides
- Pagometopus
- Paivinia
- Palacorona
- Paladin (=Weberides)
- Palaeadotes (=Pseudobergeronites)
- Palaeoharpes
- Palaeolenella
- Palaeolenides
- Palaeolenus
- Palaeolentus
- Paleonelsonia (=Nelsonia)
- Palaeophillipsia
- Palella
- Palemansuyia
- Paleodechenella
- Paleofossus
- Paleonelsonia
- Paleooryctocephalus
- Palmerara (=Nyella)
- Palmeraspis
- Palmettaspis
- Palpebralia
- Palpebrops
- Palquiella
- Panacus
- Panarchaeogonus
- Pandaspinapyga
- Panderia (=Rhodope)
- Panibole (=Proliobole)
- Panxinella
- Paofeniellus
- Paokannia
- Papillicalymene
- Papyriaspis
- Paraacidaspis
- Paraantagmus
- Paraaojia
- Parabadiella
- Parabailiella
- Parabarrandia
- Parabellefontia
- Parablackwelderia
- Parabolina (=Odontopyge)
- Parabolinella
- Parabolinina
- Parabolinites
- Parabolinoides (=Bernia)
- Parabouleia
- Parabriscoia
- Parabulbaspis
- Parabumastides
- Paracalmonia (=Proboloides)
- Paracalvinella
- Paracalymene
- Paracalymenemene (=Paracalymene)
- Paracedaria (=Pilgrimia)
- Paraceraurus
- Parachangaspis
- Parachangshania
- Parachaunoproetus
- Paracheiruroides
- Parachittidilla (=Amurticephalus)
- Paracoosia (=Manchurocephalus)
- Paracrocephalites (=Arctaspis)
- Paracryphaeus
- Paracybantyx
- Paracybeloides
- Paradamesella (=Falkopingia)
- Paradechenella
- Paradictyites
- Paradionide
- Paradoxides (=Vinicella)
- Paraencrinurus
- Paraenshia
- Paraeosoptychoparia
- Paraerbia
- Paraeremiproetus
- Parafallotaspis
- Parafrithjofia
- Paragangdeeria
- Paraglobusia
- Paragraulos
- Paragriffithides
- Paragunnia
- Paraharpides
- Parahawleia
- Parahomalonotus
- Parahousia
- Parahuainania
- Parahystricurus
- Paraichangia
- Parainouyia
- Parajialaopsis
- Parakailia
- Parakaolishania
- Parakoldinia
- Parakoldinioidia (=Macroculites; =Missisquoia; =Rhamphopyge; =Tangshanaspis)
- Parakomaspis
- Parakotuia
- Paralardeuxia
- Paralbertella
- Paraleiolichas
- Paraleiostegium
- Paralejurus
- Paralepidoproetus
- Paralevisia
- Paralisaniella
- Paralorenzangella (=Paralorenzella)
- Paralorenzella
- Paramaladioidella
- Paramalungia
- Paramansuyella (=Paramansuyia)
- Paramapania
- Paramecephalus (=Parahiolites)
- Paramegalaspis (=Dolerasaphus)
- Paramegistaspis (=Varvaspis)
- Paramenocephalites (=Solenoparina)
- Paramenomonia
- Paramgaspis
- Paramicmacca
- Paramicroparia
- Paramirabole
- Parampyx
- Paranevadella
- Parangustibole
- Paranileus
- Paranomocare
- Paranomocarella
- Paranorwoodia
- Paraojia
- Paraolenoides
- Paraolenus
- Paraonychopyge
- Paraorlovia
- Parapachyaspis
- Parapagetia (=Planodiscus)
- Parapalpebralia
- Parapaokannia
- Parapeishania
- Paraperiomma
- Paraphelaspis
- Paraphillipsia
- Paraphillipsinella (=Phillipsella; =Protophillipsinella)
- Paraphorocephala
- Parapilekia
- Paraplagiura
- Paraplesiagraulos
- Paraplethopeltis
- Paraplicatolina
- Parapliomera
- Parapoliella
- Paraporilorenzella
- Parapoulsenia
- Paraproetus
- Paraprotolenella
- Paraptychopyge
- Paraqingshuiheella (=Qingshuiheella)
- Pararaia (=Proichangia; =Tannuolaspis)
- Parasajanaspis
- Parashantungia
- Parashengia
- Parashuiyuella
- Parashumardia
- Parasolenoparia
- Parasolopleurena (=Parasolenopleura)
- Parasphaerexochus (=Mayopyge)
- Paraszechuanella
- Paratamdaspis
- Paratermierella
- Paratiresias
- Paratretaspis
- Paratrinucleus
- Paratungusella
- Parawarburgella
- Parawuania
- Parawutingaspis
- Paraxenocephalus
- Parayabeia
- Parayiliangella
- Parayinites
- Parayoungia (=Ichiyamella)
- Parayuepingia
- Parazhenbaspis
- Parazhongtiaoshanaspis
- Paraziboaspis
- Pardailhania
- Parehmania (=Mcnairia; =Rowia; =Thompsonaspis)
- Pareops
- Pareuloma (=Gansucephalina)
- Parevenkaspis
- Parillaenus
- Parisoceraurus
- Parkaspis
- Parkesolithus
- Particeps
- Parvidumus
- Parvigena
- Paryfenus (=Colymbus)
- Patalolaspis
- Pateraspis
- Patomaspis
- Patronaspis
- Pauciella
- Pauliceps

=== Pe ===
- Peachella
- Pearylandia
- Peculicephalina
- Pedinaspis
- Pedinocephalina
- Pedinocephalites
- Pedinocephalus
- Pedinocoryphe
- Pedinodechenella
- Pedinopariops
- Pegelina
- Peichiashania
- Peishania
- Peishanoides
- Pelicephalus
- Pelitlina
- Pelmanaspis
- Peltabellia (=Biolgina)
- Peltocare
- Peltura (=Anthes; =Anopocare)
- Pelturina
- Pemphigaspis (=Hallaspis)
- Penarosa (=Trinepea)
- Penchiopsis
- Pennaia
- Peracheilus (=Acheilus)
- Perakaspis
- Peraspis
- Peratagnostus (=Monaxagnostus)
- Peregrinaspis
- Perexigupyge
- Perforina
- Periallaspis
- Pericopyge
- Perimetopus
- Periomma
- Periommella
- Perirehaedulus
- Perischoclonus
- Perischodory
- Perissopliomera
- Perissopyge
- Perliproetus
- Perneraspis (=Perneria)
- Peronopsella
- Peronopsis (=Mesagnostus; =Euagnostus; =Acadagnostus; =Axagnostus; =Itagnostus)
- Perrector (=Rawops)
- Perryus
- Persiax (=Persia)
- Perthiellus
- Perunaspis (=Nitidulopyge)
- Pesaia
- Pesaiella
- Pesaiina
- Petalocephalus
- Petigurus
- Petrbokia
- Petruninaspis

=== Ph ===
- Phacopidella (=Glockeria)
- Phacopidina
- Phacopina
- Phacops
- Phaetonellus
- Phalacroma (=Platagnostus)
- Phalagnostus (=Phalacromina)
- Phalangocephalus
- Phaldagnostus
- Phanoptes (=Eccaparadoxides; =Macrocerca)
- Pharostomina (=Colpocoryphoides)
- Phaseolops
- Phillibole
- Phillibolina
- Philliboloides (=Phillibolina)
- Phillipsia
- Phillipsinella
- Philonyx
- Phoidagnostus
- Phoreotropis
- Phorocephala (=Carrickia)
- Phylacops
- Phylacterus (=Liostracinoides)
- Phyllaspis
- Phymaspis
- Physemataspis

=== Pi ===
- Pianaspis
- Piazella
- Pichunia
- Pichyklen
- Pichynturia
- Pileaspis
- Pilekia
- Piliolites
- Pilletina
- Piltonia
- Pinarella (=Pensacola)
- Pinctus
- Pingluaspis
- Pingluia
- Pingquania (=Oxygonaspis)
- Pinnuloharpes
- Piochaspis
- Piriforma
- Piriproetoides
- Piriproetus

=== Pj ===
- Pjatkovaspellus

=== Pl ===
- Placoparia
- Placoparina
- Plaesiacomia
- Plagiolaria
- Plagiura (=Ruichengella; =Plagiurella)
- Plakhinella
- Planaspis
- Planilobus
- Planiscutellum (=Protoscutellum)
- Planocephalus
- Planokaskia
- Planolimbus
- Plasiaspis
- Platillaenus
- Platyantyx
- Platycalymene (=Sulcocalymene)
- Platycoryphe (=Liangshanaspis)
- Platydiamesus
- Platylichas (=Lingucephalichas)
- Platylisania
- Platypeltoides (=Platypeltis)
- Platyptychopyge
- Platysaukia
- Platyscutellum
- Plebiellus
- Plectasaphus
- Plecteuloma
- Plectrella
- Plectrifer
- Plectrocrania
- Plesiagraulos
- Plesiamecephalus
- Plesigangdeeria
- Plesiocilia
- Plesioconvexa
- Plesioinouyella
- Plesiomalvinella
- Plesionevadia
- Plesioparabolina
- Plesioperiomma
- Plesiowensus
- Plesiowuania
- Plesisolenoparia
- Plesiyuepingia
- Plethopeltella
- Plethopeltides
- Plethopeltis (=Plethometopus; =Enontioura)
- Plethopeltoides (=Kulyumbopeltis)
- Pleurinodus
- Pleuroctenium (=Dichagnostus)
- Plicatolina
- Plicatolinella
- Pliomera (=Amphion)
- Pliomerella
- Pliomerellus
- Pliomeridius
- Pliomerina (=Pliomeraspis)
- Pliomeroides
- Pliomerops
- Plurinodus
- Plutonides (=Plutonia)

=== Po ===
- Podoliproetus
- Podowrinella
- Pogrebovites
- Pokrovskayaspis
- Pokrovskiella
- Poletaevella
- Poletaevia
- Poliella (=Bornemannia)
- Poliellaspidella
- Poliellaspis
- Poliellina
- Politicurus
- Politinella
- Polliaxis
- Polyariella
- Polycertaspis
- Polycyrtaspis
- Polydinotes
- Polypleuraspis
- Pompeckia
- Pontipalpebralia
- Popigaia
- Popovkiaspis
- Popovkites
- Poriagraulos
- Porilorenzella (=Jinnania)
- Poriplethopeltis
- Poronileus
- Poroscutellum
- Portentosus
- Porterfieldia
- Portlockia
- Poshania
- Postfallotaspis
- Poulsenella
- Poulsenia
- Poulseniella

=== Pr ===
- Pradesia
- Pradoella
- Praecoparia
- Praedechenella
- Praepatokephalus
- Pragolithus
- Pragoproetus
- Prantlia (=Malvernocare)
- Pratungusella
- Prehousia
- Preodontochile
- Presbynileus (=Paranileus)
- Prestalia
- Pribylia
- Priceaspis (=Fitzroyaspis)
- Pricyclopyge (=Bicyclopyge)
- Primaspis
- Primoriella
- Princetonella (=Calyptomma)
- Prionocheilus (=Pharostoma)
- Prionopeltis (=Phaetonides; =Phaeton)
- Proagnostus (=Agnostascus; =Paragnostascus)
- Proampyx
- Proapatokephaloides
- Proapatokephalops
- Proasaphiscina
- Proasaphiscus
- Proasaphus
- Proavus
- Probilacunaspis
- Probolichas
- Probolops
- Probowmania
- Probowmaniella (=Proshantungaspis)
- Probowmanops
- Proceratocephala (=Drummuckaspis)
- Proceratopyge
- Prochuangia
- Prodalmanitina
- Prodamesella (=Metaprodamesella; =Neoprodamesella)
- Prodiacoryphe
- Prodikelocephalites
- Prodontochile
- Prodrevermannia
- Proehmaniella
- Proerbia
- Proetides
- Proetina
- Proetocephalus
- Proetopeltis
- Proetus (=Euproetus; =Aeonia; =Devonoproetus; =Falcatoproetus; =Forbesia; =Scotoproetus; =Trigonaspis)
- Profallotaspis
- Prohedinaspis
- Prohedinella
- Prohedinia (=Tosotychia)
- Proinouyia
- Prokootenia
- Prokops
- Proliaoningaspis
- Proliostracus
- Prolloydia
- Prolonchocephalus
- Promacropyge (=Aksapyge)
- Promegalaspides
- Promeitania
- Prometeoraspis
- Prophysemataspis
- Proricephalus
- Proromma
- Prosaukia (=Stenosaukia)
- Proscharyia
- Prosocephalus
- Prosopiscus
- Prospectatrix
- Prostrix
- Prosymphysurus
- Protacanthina
- Protagraulos
- Protaitzehoia
- Protaldonaia
- Protarchaeogonus
- Protemnites (=Prismenaspis)
- Proteuloma (=Mioeuloma)
- Protobronteus
- Protocalymene
- Protocerauroides
- Protochittidilla
- Protocyphaspides
- Protoencrinurella
- Protohedinia
- Protoincaia
- Protolenella
- Protolenoides
- Protolenus (=Bergeronia; =Matthewlenus)
- Protolloydolithus
- Protopeltura
- Protopliomerella
- Protopliomerops (=Stototropis)
- Protopresbynileus (=Pseudonileus)
- Protoptychopyge
- Protoryctocephalus
- Protostygina
- Protrachoparia
- Protypus (=Bicaspis)
- Prouktaspis
- Proveedoria
- Proxiniobe
- Prozacanthoides
- Pruvostinoides

=== Ps ===
- Psalaspis
- Psalikilopsis
- Psalikilus
- Pscemiaspis
- Psephosthenaspis (=Ludvigsenella)
- Pseudacrocephalaspina
- Pseudagnostina (=Litagnostus; =Plethagnostus; =Pseudagnostus; =Rhaptagnostus; =Sulcatagnostus; =Xestagnostus)
- Pseudamphoton
- Pseudampyxina
- Pseudanomocarina
- Pseudaphelaspis
- Pseudatops
- Pseudeugonocare
- Pseudichangia (=Zhuxiella; =Sematiscus; =Strenax)
- Pseudinouyia
- Pseudoacrocephalites
- Pseudoasaphinus
- Pseudoasaphoides
- Pseudoasaphus
- Pseudoasiatella
- Pseudobasilicoides
- Pseudobasilicus
- Pseudobasiliella
- Pseudobasiloides
- Pseudobirmanites (=Madygenia)
- Pseudoblackwelderia
- Pseudobollandia
- Pseudocalvinella
- Pseudocalymene (=Eucalymene)
- Pseudocheirurus
- Pseudoclelandia
- Pseudocobboldia
- Pseudocrepicephalus
- Pseudocryphaeus
- Pseudocybele
- Pseudocyrtosymbole
- Pseudodechenella (=Arcticormistonia)
- Pseudodipharus
- Pseudodudu
- Pseudoeobronteus
- Pseudoerbia
- Pseudoerbiopsis
- Pseudoeteraspis
- Pseudogerastos
- Pseudoglyptagnostus (=Glyptagnostotes)
- Pseudogriphasaphus
- Pseudogygites
- Pseudohysterolenus
- Pseudohystricurus
- Pseudojudomia
- Pseudokadyella
- Pseudokainella (=Elkanaspis; =Parakainella; =Fatocephalus)
- Pseudokingstonia
- Pseudokoldinella
- Pseudokoldinia
- Pseudokoldinioidia
- Pseudoleiostegium
- Pseudolenus
- Pseudolevinia
- Pseudoliostracina (=Emmrichella; =Liaoyangaspis)
- Pseudoliostracus
- Pseudolorenzella
- Pseudomaladioides
- Pseudomapania
- Pseudomegalaspis
- Pseudomera
- Pseudomexicella
- Pseudonericella
- Pseudoolenoides
- Pseudopaokannia
- Pseudopetigurus
- Pseudophillipsia
- Pseudoplesiagraulos
- Pseudopliomera
- Pseudoproetus
- Pseudoprotolenella
- Pseudoptychopyge
- Pseudoptyocephalus
- Pseudoredlichia
- Pseudoresserops
- Pseudorhaptagnostus (=Neoagnostus; =Euplethagnostus; =Hyperagnostus; =Tarayagnostus; =Calagnostus)
- Pseudosalteria
- Pseudosaratogia
- Pseudosarkia
- Pseudosaukia
- Pseudosaukianda
- Pseudosilesiops
- Pseudosolenoparia
- Pseudosolenopleura
- Pseudospatulina
- Pseudosphaerexochus (=Zethus)
- Pseudostygina
- Pseudotaishania
- Pseudotaitzuia
- Pseudotalbotina
- Pseudotermierella
- Pseudotrinodus
- Pseudotupolichas (=Arctinuroides)
- Pseudowaribole
- Pseudowentsuia
- Pseudowutingaspis
- Pseudoyiliangella
- Pseudoyuepingia (=Iwayaspis; =Sayramaspis)
- Pseudozacanthopsis
- Psilacella
- Psilocara
- Psilocephalina
- Psilocephalinella (=Psilocephalus; =Psilocephalina; =Borthaspis)
- Psilocephalops
- Psilostracus
- Psychopyge

=== Pt ===
- Ptarmigania
- Ptarmiganoides
- Pterocephalia (=Pterocephalus; =Hederacauda)
- Pterocephalina
- Pterocephalops
- Pterocephalopsinus (=Pterocephalops)
- Pterocoryphe
- Pteroparia
- Pteroredlichia (=Spinoredlichia)
- Pterygometopus
- Ptilillaenus
- Ptychagnostus (=Acidusus?)
- Ptychaspis (=Asioptychaspis)
- Ptychometopus
- Ptychoparella (=Eoptychoparia; =Syspacephalus; =Elrathina)
- Ptychoparia (=Agraulopsis; =Ptychoparioides)
- Ptychoparopsis (=Berabichia)
- Ptychopleurites (=Ptychopleura; =Aposolenopleura; =Punctularia)
- Ptychopyge
- Ptyctolorenzella
- Ptyocephalus (=Kirkella)

=== Pu ===
- Puanella
- Puanocephalus
- Pudoproetus (=Zhifangia)
- Pugilator
- Pugionicauda
- Pulcherproetus
- Pulchricapitus (=Reaganaspis)
- Pulvillaspis
- Pumilina
- Punctaspis
- Punillaspis
- Punka
- Pusillabole

=== Py ===
- Pyraustocranium
- Pyrimetopus
- Pytine
- Pyttstrigis

== Q ==
Contents:	A B C D E F G H I J K L M N O P Q R S T U V W X Y Z — See also

=== Qi ===
- Qiandongaspis
- Qiannanagraulos
- Qiaodiella
- Qiaotingaspis
- Qiaotouaspis
- Qijiangia
- Qilianaspis
- Qilianshania
- Qingkouia (=Paradrepanuroides)
- Qingshuiheia
- Qingshuihella
- Qingzhenaspis
- Qinlingia

=== Qu ===
- Quadrahomagnostus
- Quadratapyge
- Quadratillaenus
- Quadratispina
- Quadratoproetus
- Quadrops
- Quandraspis
- Quebecaspis
- Querandinia
- Quinquecosta
- Quitacetra
- Quitalia
- Quyuania

== R ==
Contents:	A B C D E F G H I J K L M N O P Q R S T U V W X Y Z — See also

=== Ra ===
- Raaschellina
- Rabienops
- Rabuloproetus
- Rabutina
- Radiaspis (=Xanionurus; =Charybdaspis)
- Radiolichas (=Diplolichas; =Septidenta)
- Radiopyge
- Radioscutellum
- Radiurus
- Radnoria
- Raduginella
- Raerinproetus
- Rananasus
- Randaynia
- Randicephalus
- Ranunculoproetus
- Raphioampyx
- Raphiophorus
- Raragnostus
- Rasettaspis
- Rasettia (=Platycolpus)
- Ratinkaspis
- Rawlinsella
- Raymondaspis (=Warburgella)
- Raymondella (=Reedaspis)
- Raymondina (=Raymondia)
- Raymondites

=== Re ===
- Reacalymene
- Realaspis
- Rectifrontinella
- Redlichaspis (=Lisaniella)
- Redlichia (=Hoeferia; =Mesodema; =Dongshania)
- Redlichina
- Redlichops
- Reediella
- Reedocalymene
- Reedolithus
- Reedops
- Reedus
- Regius
- Reillopleura
- Remacutanger
- Remizites
- Remopleurella
- Remopleurides
- Remopleuridiella
- Rencunia
- Renhuaia
- Renniella
- Repinaella
- Repinaspis
- Reraspis
- Resimopsis
- Resseraspis
- Resseria
- Resserops
- Resseropsis
- Retamaspis
- Reubenella
- Reuscholithus
- Reussiana

=== Rh ===
- Rhadinopleura
- Rhaxeros (=Rhax)
- Rheicops
- Rhenocynproetus
- Rhenogriffides
- Rhenops
- Rhinoferus (=Lawiaspis; =Ropschiaspis)
- Rhinophacops
- Rhinoreedops
- Rhodonaspis
- Rhombampyx
- Rhyssometopus

=== Ri ===
- Richardsonaspis
- Richardsonella (=Lakella; =Protapatokephalus)
- Richterarges
- Richteraspis
- Richterella
- Richterops (=Marsaisia)
- Rimouskia
- Rina
- Rinconaspis
- Rinconia
- Rinella
- Ritella

=== Ro ===
- Robergia
- Robergiella
- Robroyia
- Rochaeva
- Rogersvillia
- Roksaspis
- Rokycanocoryphe
- Rollia
- Rollmops
- Romanops
- Roncellia
- Rondocephalus
- Rongxiella
- Rontrippia
- Rorringtonia (=Analocaspis; =Chenaspis; =Trigonoproetus)
- Rosehillia
- Rossaspis
- Rossicurus
- Rostrifinis

=== Ru ===
- Ruegenometopus
- Rugulites (=Podolites)
- Ruichengaspis
- Runcinodiscus
- Runnania
- Russiana (=Scintilla)

=== Ry ===
- Ryckholtia

== S ==
Contents:	A B C D E F G H I J K L M N O P Q R S T U V W X Y Z — See also

=== Sa ===
- Sacha
- Sachaspis
- Sagavia
- Sagitaspis
- Sagitoides
- Saharops
- Sailoma
- Sailycaspis
- Saimachia
- Saimixiella
- Sajanaspis
- Sakhaspidella
- Salankanaspis
- Saltaspis
- Salteria
- Salteria (=Errinys)
- Salterocoryphe
- Salterolithus (=Smeathenia)
- Sambremeuaspis
- Samgonus (="Lampropeltis")
- Sanaschtykgolia
- Sanbernardaspis
- Sandoveria
- Sanduhedinaspis
- Sanduspis
- Sangzhiscutellum
- Sanhuangshania
- Sanidopyge
- Sanwania
- Sao (=Acanthocnemis; =Acanthogramma)
- Saonella
- Sapenion
- Sapushania
- Sarassina
- Saratogia (=Idahoia; =Meeria)
- Sardaspis
- Sardoredlichia
- Sarkia
- Sarrabesia
- Saryaspis
- Saukia
- Saukianda
- Saukiella
- Saukioides (=Pseudosaukia; =Jeholaspis)

=== Sc ===
- Scabrella
- Scabriscutellum (=Dicranactis)
- Sceptaspis
- Schaderthalaspis
- Schagonaria
- Scharyia
- Schismagnostus
- Schistometopus
- Schizophillipsia
- Schizoproetina
- Schizoproetoides
- Schizoproetus
- Schizostylus
- Schmalenseeia
- Schmidtaspis
- Schmidtiellus (=Schmidtia)
- Schmidtops
- Schoharia
- Schopfaspis
- Schoriecare
- Schoriella
- Schoriina
- Schyilaspis
- Scinocephalus
- Scopelochasmops
- Scotiella
- Scotoharpes (=Aristoharpes; =Selenoharpes)
- Sculptaspis
- Sculptella
- Sculptoproetus
- Scutellum (=Bronteus; =Brontes; =Goldfussia; =Brontes; =Goldius)

=== Sd ===
- Sdzuyella
- Sdzuyomia

=== Se ===
- Sectigena
- Seisonia
- Sekwiaspis
- Seleneceme (=Alsataspis)
- Selenopeltis (=Languedopeltis; =Polyeres)
- Selenopeltoides
- Seletoides
- Selindella
- Semadiscus
- Semagnostus
- Semicyclocephalus
- Semiproetus
- Semisphaerocephalus
- Septimopeltis
- Seriaspis
- Serksioides
- Serrania
- Serrodiscus (=Paradiscus)
- Sestrostega
- Severina
- Sevillia

=== Sh ===
- Shaanxia
- Shabaella
- Shahaspis
- Shanchengziella
- Shanganella
- Shanghaia
- Shanghaiaspis
- Shangsiaspis
- Shangtungia
- Shantungaspis
- Shanxiella
- Shatania
- Shengia
- Shenjiawania
- Shergoldia
- Shergoldina
- Shickshockia
- Shidiania
- Shifangia
- Shihuigouia
- Shilengshuia
- Shipaiella
- Shiqihepsis
- Shirakiella
- Shitaia
- Shivelicus
- Shuangshania
- Shuiyuella
- Shuizuia
- Shumardia
- Shumardoella (=Shumardella)
- Shumardops

=== Si ===
- Sibiriaspis
- Sibiriopleura
- Sichuanolenus
- Sigmakainella
- Sigmocheilus
- Signatops
- Silesiops
- Siligerites
- Simaproetus
- Sinampyxina
- Sinespinaspis
- Sinijanella
- Sinobathyurus
- Sinobole
- Sinocoosella
- Sinocrepicephalus
- Sinocybele
- Sinocyrtoproetus
- Sinodiscus (=Tologoja)
- Sinoluia
- Sinopagetia
- Sinopaladin
- Sinoparapilekia
- Sinoproceratopyge
- Sinoproetus
- Sinoptychoparia
- Sinosaukia
- Sinoschistometopus
- Sinosymbole
- Sinskia
- Sivovella

=== Sk ===
- Skelipyx
- Skemmatocare
- Skemmatopyge
- Skljarella (=Proaraiopleura)
- Skreiaspis
- Skryjagnostus

=== Sl ===
- Slimanella

=== Sn ===
- Snajdria
- Sneedvillia

=== So ===
- Sobovaspis
- Sohopleura
- Sokhretia
- Solariproetus
- Solenoparia
- Solenoparops
- Solenopleura
- Solenopleurella
- Solenopleuropsis
- Solontzella
- Somatrikelon
- Sombrerella
- Songkania
- Songtaoia
- Songxites
- Soomaspis

=== Sp ===
- Spathacalymene
- Spatulata (=Spatulina)
- Spencella
- Spencia (=Stauroholcus)
- Spergenaspis
- Sphaeragnostus
- Sphaerexochus (=Korolevium; =Onukia; =Parvixochus)
- Sphaerocoryphe (=Ellipsocoryphe; =Hemisphaerocoryphe)
- Sphaerophthalmus
- Spinacephalus
- Spineuloma
- Spinibole
- Spinibolops
- Spinicryphops
- Spinillaenus
- Spinimetopus
- Spiniscutellum
- Spinoproetus
- Spirantyx
- Spizharaspis

=== Sq ===
- Squarrosoella

=== St ===
- Stapeleyella
- Staurocephalus
- Stegnopsis
- Stelckaspis
- Stella
- Stenambon
- Stenelymus
- Stenoblepharum (=Viruanaspis)
- Stenochilina
- Stenopareia
- Stenopilus
- Stenorhachis
- Stephanocare
- Stephenaspis
- Sternbergaspis
- Sthenarocalymene
- Stigmacephaloides
- Stigmacephalus
- Stigmadiscus
- Stigmametopus
- Stigmaspis
- Stigmatoa
- Stiktocybele
- Stoecklinia
- Stoloharpes
- Strenuaeva (=Hindermeyeria)
- Strenuella
- Strettonia
- Strictagnostus
- Strigambitus
- Strigigenalis
- Strotactinus
- Strotocephala
- Struszia
- Struveaspis
- Struveops
- Struveproetus
- Struveria
- Stubblefieldia
- Stummiana
- Stygina
- Styginella

=== Su ===
- Subeia
- Subitella
- Sudanomocarina
- Sujaraspis
- Sukhanaspis (=Kerbinella)
- Sulcocephalus
- Sulcubole
- Suludella
- Suluderella (="Mareda")
- Suluktella
- Sunaspidella
- Sunaspis
- Sunina
- Sunocavia (=Cavia)
- Sunwaptia
- Suriaspis
- Suribongia
- Suvorovaaspis
- Suyougouia

=== Sv ===
- Svalbardites
- Svenax

=== Sy ===
- Sycophantia
- Symphyroxochus
- Symphysops
- Symphysurina (=Symphysurinella; =Symphysuroides)
- Symphysurus
- Syndianella
- Synphoria (=Eocorycephalus; =Neosynphoria)
- Synphoroides
- Syspacheilus

=== Sz ===
- Szeaspis (=Spitiaspis)
- Szechuanella
- Szechuanolenus

== T ==
Contents:	A B C D E F G H I J K L M N O P Q R S T U V W X Y Z — See also

=== Ta ===
- Tabalqueia
- Tabatopygellina
- Tadakoustia
- Tadjikia
- Taemasaspis (=Gondwanaspis; =Snoderaspis)
- Taenicephalina
- Taenicephalites
- Taenicephalops
- Taenicephalus (=Bemaspis; =Maustonia)
- Taenora
- Tafilaltaspis
- Tagazella
- Tagenarella
- Taianocephalus
- Taiganella
- Taihangshania
- Taihungshania (=Miquelina)
- Taijiangia
- Taijiangocephalus
- Taimyraspis
- Taipakia
- Taishania
- Taitzehoia
- Taitzuia
- Taitzuina
- Taklamakania (=Xinjiangia)
- Talacastops
- Talbotina
- Talbotinella
- Talus
- Tambakia
- Tamdaspis (=Psiloyuepingia)
- Tangbailaspis
- Tangjiaella
- Tangshihlingia
- Tangwangzhaia
- Taniaspidella
- Tankhella
- Tannudiscus
- Tanybregma
- Taoyuania (=Batyraspis)
- Tapinocalymene
- Tarijactinoides (=Bolivianaspis)
- Tarimella (=Yinganaspis)
- Tarricoia
- Tarynaspis
- Tasmanaspis
- Tasmanocephalus
- Tatonaspis
- Tatulaspis
- Tavsenia
- Tawstockia
- Taynaella

=== Tc ===
- Tchabdania
- Tchaiaspis.
- Tcherkesovia
- Tchernyshevioides
- Tchukeraspis
- Tchuostachia

=== Te ===
- Tegopelte
- Teichertops
- Teinistion (=Dorypygella)
- Telaeomarrolithus
- Telephina (=Telephus)
- Telephops
- Teljanzella
- Tellerina
- Temnoura (=Asteromajia)
- Tengfengia
- Tenuipeltis
- Terataspis
- Teratokoptura
- Teratorhynchus
- Terechtaspis (=Nellina)
- Termieraspis
- Termierella
- Terranovella
- Terranovia
- Tersella
- Tersiceps
- Tesselacauda
- Tetinia
- Tetraceroura
- Tetragonocephalus
- Tetrapsellium
- Tewonia

=== Th ===
- Thaiaspella
- Thaiaspis
- Thailandium
- Thalabaria
- Thaleops (=Hydrolaenus)
- Theamataspis
- Thebanaspis
- Thelecalymene

- Theodenisia (=Denisia Clark 1924 (non Hübner, 1825: preoccupied); =Calculites; =Mannschreekia)
- Thigriffides
- Tholifrons (=Paraphoreotropsis)
- Tholus
- Thomastus
- Thomondia
- Thoracocare
- Thoralaspis
- Thoralocolus
- Thulincola (=Pharostomaspis)
- Thuringaspis
- Thymurus
- Thysanopeltella
- Thysanopeltis
- Thysanopyge (=Basilicoides)

=== Ti ===
- Tianjingshania
- Tianshanocephalus
- Tiantouzhania
- Tibagya (=Schizopyge)
- Tibikephalus
- Tienshihfuia
- Tienzhuia
- Tilsleyia
- Timnaella
- Timoraspis
- Tinaspis
- Tingocephalus
- Tingyuania

=== Tj ===
- Tjungiella

=== To ===
- Toernquistia (=Paratoernquistia)
- Toernquistina
- Tolanaspis
- Tolbinella
- Toletanaspis
- Tolkienia
- Tollaspis
- Tolstotchichaspis
- Tomagnostella
- Tomagnostus
- Tongxinaspis
- Tonkinella
- Torgaschina
- Torifera
- Tormesiscus
- Torosus
- Tosacephalus
- Tosotychia
- Tostonia
- Townleyella
- Toxochasmops
- Toxophacops
- Toxotina
- Toxotis

=== Tr ===
- Trachoparia
- Trachycheilus
- Trachyostracus
- Tramoria
- Trapezocephalina
- Tretaspis
- Treveropyge
- Triadaspis
- Triangulaspis (=Acutaspis; =Angustaeva; =Plenudiscus; =Triangullina)
- Trianguraspis
- Triarthrella
- Triarthroides
- Triarthropsis
- Triarthrus (=Brongniartia)
- Tricopelta
- Tricrepicephalus (=Paracrepicephalus)
- Trifonella
- Trigocephalus
- Trigoncekovia
- Trigonocerca
- Trigonocercella
- Trigonyangaspis (=Trigonaspis)
- Trilobagnostus (=Rudagnostus)
- Trimerocephalus (=Eutrimerocephalus)
- Trimerolichas
- Trimerus
- Trinia
- Trinodus (=Arthrorhachis, =Metagnostus; =Girvanagnostus)
- Trinucleoides
- Trinucleus (=Edgellia)
- Triplagnostus (=Huarpagnostus; =Solenagnostus; =Pentagnostus; =Aristarius; =Aotagnostus; =Acidusus?; =Canotagnostus; =Zeteagnostus)
- Triproetus
- Trisulcagnostus (=Tririmagnostus)
- Trochurus (=Corydocephalus; =Plusiarges; =Makromuktis)
- Troedssonia
- Tropiconiproetus
- Tropicoryphe
- Tropidocare
- Tropidocoryphe
- Tropidopyge
- Truncatometopus
- Trymataspis
- Trypaulites

=== Ts ===
- Tsaidamaspis
- Tschernyschewiella (=Schmidtia)
- Tsinania (=Dictyites)
- Tsunyidiscus (=Mianxiandiscus; =Liangshandiscus; =Emeidiscus; =Hupeidiscus; =Shizhudiscus; =Guizhoudiscus)

=== Tu ===
- Tuberaspis
- Tugurellum
- Tukalandaspis
- Tumicephalus
- Tumidulaspis
- Tumulina
- Tungtzuella
- Tungusella
- Tuojiangella
- Turantyx
- Turcopyge
- Turgicephalus
- Turkestanella
- Tuvanella (=Eleganolimba)
- Tuvanellus
- Tuyunaspis

=== Ty ===
- Tylotaitzuia
- Tylotaspis
- Tympanuella
- Typhlokorynetes
- Typhloniscus
- Typhloproetus

=== Tz ===
- Tzuchiatocnemis

== U ==
Contents:	A B C D E F G H I J K L M N O P Q R S T U V W X Y Z — See also

=== Ud ===
- Udjanella

=== Uk ===
- Uktaspis

=== Ul ===
- Ulakhanella
- Ulania
- Ullaspis
- Ulrichaspis
- Ulugtella

=== Un ===
- Uncaspis
- Undillia
- Unguliproetus
- Unicapeltis

=== Up ===
- Upplandiops

=== Ur ===
- Uralichas (=Bohemolichas; =Platopolichas)
- Uralops
- Uraloscutellum
- Urbanaspis
- Uriarra
- Uripes
- Urjungaspis
- Uromystrum
- Ursinella

=== Us ===
- Ushbaspis (=Metaredlichioides)
- Usoviana
- Usovinurus
- Usumunaspis

=== Ut ===
- Utagnostus
- Utaspis
- Utia

=== Ux ===
- Uxunella

== V ==
Contents:	A B C D E F G H I J K L M N O P Q R S T U V W X Y Z — See also

=== Va ===
- Valdaites
- Valdariops
- Valenagnostus
- Validaspis
- Valongia
- Valtoressia
- Vandergrachtia
- Vanuxemella (=Vistoia)
- Varanella
- Variopelta
- Varvia

=== Ve ===
- Vega
- Velieuxia
- Venosus
- Veragraulos
- Verditerrina
- Verkholenella
- Vermontella
- Vernaculina

=== Vi ===
- Viaphacops
- Vica
- Vicinoproetus (=Vicinopeltis)
- Victorispina
- Vidria
- Vietnamia
- Vironiaspis
- Vistoia
- Vittaella

=== Vo ===
- Vogdesia
- Vogesina
- Voigtaspis
- Vokovicia
- Volchovites
- Volkops
- Volocephalina
- Vologdinaspis
- Volonellus

=== Vy ===
- Vysocania

== W ==
Contents:	A B C D E F G H I J K L M N O P Q R S T U V W X Y Z — See also

=== Wa ===
- Waergangia
- Wafangdiania
- Wafangia
- Wagnerispina
- Waideggula
- Waigatchella
- Waisfeldaspis
- Walcottaspidella
- Walcottaspis
- Waldminia
- Walencrinuroides
- Wallacia
- Walliserops
- Wanbeiaspis
- Wandelella
- Wangcunia
- Wangzishia
- Wanhuaia
- Wannania
- Wanneria
- Wanshania
- Wanwanaspis
- Wanwanoglobus
- Warburgaspis
- Warburgella (=Holometopus; =Owensella)
- Warendia
- Waribole
- Wayaonia

=== We ===
- Weania
- Weberiphillipsia (=Spinolimbella)
- Weberopeltis
- Wedekindiaspis (=Wedekindia)
- Weeksina
- Weijiaspis
- Weishania
- Welleraspis (=Avonaspis)
- Wenganella
- Wengangaspis
- Wenganlenus
- Wentsuia
- Westergaardella
- Westergaardia (=Sphaerophthalmoides)
- Westergaardites
- Westonaspis
- Westropia
- Weyeraspis
- Weyerites
- Weymouthia

=== Wh ===
- Whittakerites
- Whittardolithus
- Whittingtonella
- Whittingtonia

=== Wi ===
- Wilbernia
- Wilcoxaspis
- Wilsonarella
- Winiskia
- Winterbergia
- Witryides
- Wittekindtia

=== Wo ===
- Wolayella
- Wolfartaspis
- Wolfartius (= "Farsia")
- Wolynaspis
- Wongia

=== Wu ===
- Wuanoides
- Wuchuanella
- Wudangia
- Wuhaina
- Wuhuia (=Deadwoodia)
- Wuhushania
- Wujiajiania
- Wuoaspis (=Coronaspis)
- Wutaishanaspis
- Wutaishania
- Wutingaspis
- Wutingshania

== X ==
Contents:	A B C D E F G H I J K L M N O P Q R S T U V W X Y Z — See also

=== Xe ===
- Xela
- Xenadoche
- Xenasaphus
- Xenoboloides
- Xenocheilos
- Xenocybe
- Xenocyclopyge
- Xenodechenella
- Xenoredlichia
- Xenostegium
- Xestagnostus

=== Xi ===
- Xilingxia
- Xianfengia
- Xiangia
- Xiangqianaspis
- Xiangshanaspis
- Xiangshania
- Xiangzhongella
- Xiaodaositunia
- Xiaofangshangia
- Xiaomajiella
- Xiaoshiella
- Xichuania
- Xinanocephalus
- Xinglongia
- Xingrenaspis (=Spitella; =Danzhaina; =Wuxunaspis)
- Xingzishania
- Xinhuangaspis
- Xintaia
- Xiphogonium (=Trautensteinproetus)
- Xiuqiella
- Xiushanopsis
- Xiushuilithus
- Xiushuiproetus

=== Xu ===
- Xuanenia
- Xundiania
- Xuzhouia

=== Xy ===
- Xylabion
- Xyoeax
- Xystocrania (=Xialiangshania)
- Xystridura (=Milesia)

== Y ==
Contents:	A B C D E F G H I J K L M N O P Q R S T U V W X Y Z — See also

=== Ya ===
- Yabeia
- Yakutiana (=Pseudophalacroma)
- Yangweizhouia
- Yanhaoia
- Yanquetruzia
- Yanshanaspis
- Yanshania
- Yanshanopyge
- Yantaiella
- Yanzhuangia
- Yaopuia
- Yaoyiayuella
- Yarmakaspis

=== Ye ===
- Yeshanaspis

=== Yi ===
- Yichangaspis
- Yilliangella (=Palaeoaspis)
- Yilliangellina
- Yinaspis
- Yingziaspis
- Yinites
- Yinjiangia
- Yinpanolithus
- Yinshanaspis
- Yishanaspis

=== Yo ===
- Yohoaspis
- Yokusenia
- Yongwolia
- Yorkella
- Yosimuraspis (=Eoyosimuraspis; =Metayosimuraspis)
- Youngia
- Yoyarria

=== Yu ===
- Yuehsienszella
- Yuepingioides
- Yujinia
- Yuknessaspis
- Yukonaspis
- Yukonia
- Yukonides
- Yumenaspis
- Yunlingia
- Yunmengshania
- Yunnanaspidella
- Yunnanaspis
- Yunnanocephalus (=Pseudoptychoparia)
- Yurakia
- Yushugouia

== Z ==
Contents:	A B C D E F G H I J K L M N O P Q R S T U V W X Y Z — See also

=== Za ===
- Zacanthellina
- Zacanthoides (=Embolimus)
- Zacanthopsina
- Zacanthopsis
- Zacompsus
- Zaozhuangaspis
- Zaplaops
- Zazvorkaspis

=== Zb ===
- Zbirovia

=== Zd ===
- Zdicella

=== Ze ===
- Zeliszkella
- Zetaproetus
- Zetillaenus

=== Zh ===
- Zhaishania
- Zhanglouia
- Zhangshania
- Zhegangula
- Zhejiangoproetus
- Zhenania
- Zhenbaspis (=Yankongia; =Zhenxiongaspis)
- Zhenganites (=Eosoptychopyge)
- Zhenpingaspis
- Zhongtiaoshanaspis
- Zhongweia
- Zhuangliella
- Zhuitunia
- Zhujia
- Zhusilengops

=== Zi ===
- Ziboaspidella
- Ziboaspis
- Zigzuella

=== Zl ===
- Zlichovaspis (=Devonodontochile; =Spinodontochile)

=== Zo ===
- Zoraspis

=== Zu ===
- Zuninaspis

== See also ==
- List of ammonite genera

== Notes and references ==
Uncited genera names can be attributed to Sepkoski (2002) and Jell & Adrain (2003).

=== Bibliography ===
- Özdikmen, Hüseyin (2009), "Nomenclatural changes for twenty trilobite genera", Munis Entomology & Zoology, 4: 155–171
