= Tavsenia =

Tavsenia Temporal range: Cambrian

Scientific classification
- Missing taxonomy template (fix): Tavsenia

Tavsenia is an extinct genus from a well-known class of fossil marine arthropods, the trilobites. It lived during the Cambrian Period, which lasted from approximately 539 to 485 million years ago.
