= Semicyclocephalus =

Semicyclocephalus Temporal range: Cambrian

Scientific classification
- Kingdom: Animalia
- Phylum: Arthropoda
- Clade: †Artiopoda
- Class: †Trilobita
- Order: †Ptychopariida
- Family: †Plethopeltidae
- Genus: †Semicyclocephalus; Ivshin, 1952

Semicyclocephalus is an extinct genus from a well-known class of fossil marine arthropods, the trilobites. It lived during the Cambrian Period, which lasted from approximately 539 to 485 million years ago.
