= Flabellocephalus =

Flabellocephalus Temporal range: Cambrian

Scientific classification
- Kingdom: Animalia
- Phylum: Arthropoda
- Clade: †Artiopoda
- Class: †Trilobita
- Order: †Asaphida
- Family: †Pterocephaliidae
- Genus: †Flabellocephalus; Jinlin & Shaoxin, 1984

Extinct genus of trilobites

Flabellocephalus is an extinct genus of asaphid trilobite. Members of this genus lived during the Cambrian Period, which lasted from approximately 542 to 488 million years ago.
