= Calymenidius =

Scientific classification
- Kingdom: Animalia
- Phylum: Arthropoda
- Clade: †Artiopoda
- Class: †Trilobita
- Order: †Ptychopariida
- Family: †Lonchocephalidae
- Genus: †Calymenidius; Rasetti, 1944

Calymenidius is an extinct genus of trilobites.
