= Liocare =

Liocare Temporal range: Cambrian

Scientific classification
- Missing taxonomy template (fix): Liocare

Liocare is an extinct genus from a well-known class of fossil marine arthropods, the trilobites. It lived during the Cambrian Period, which lasted from approximately 542 to 488 million years ago.
