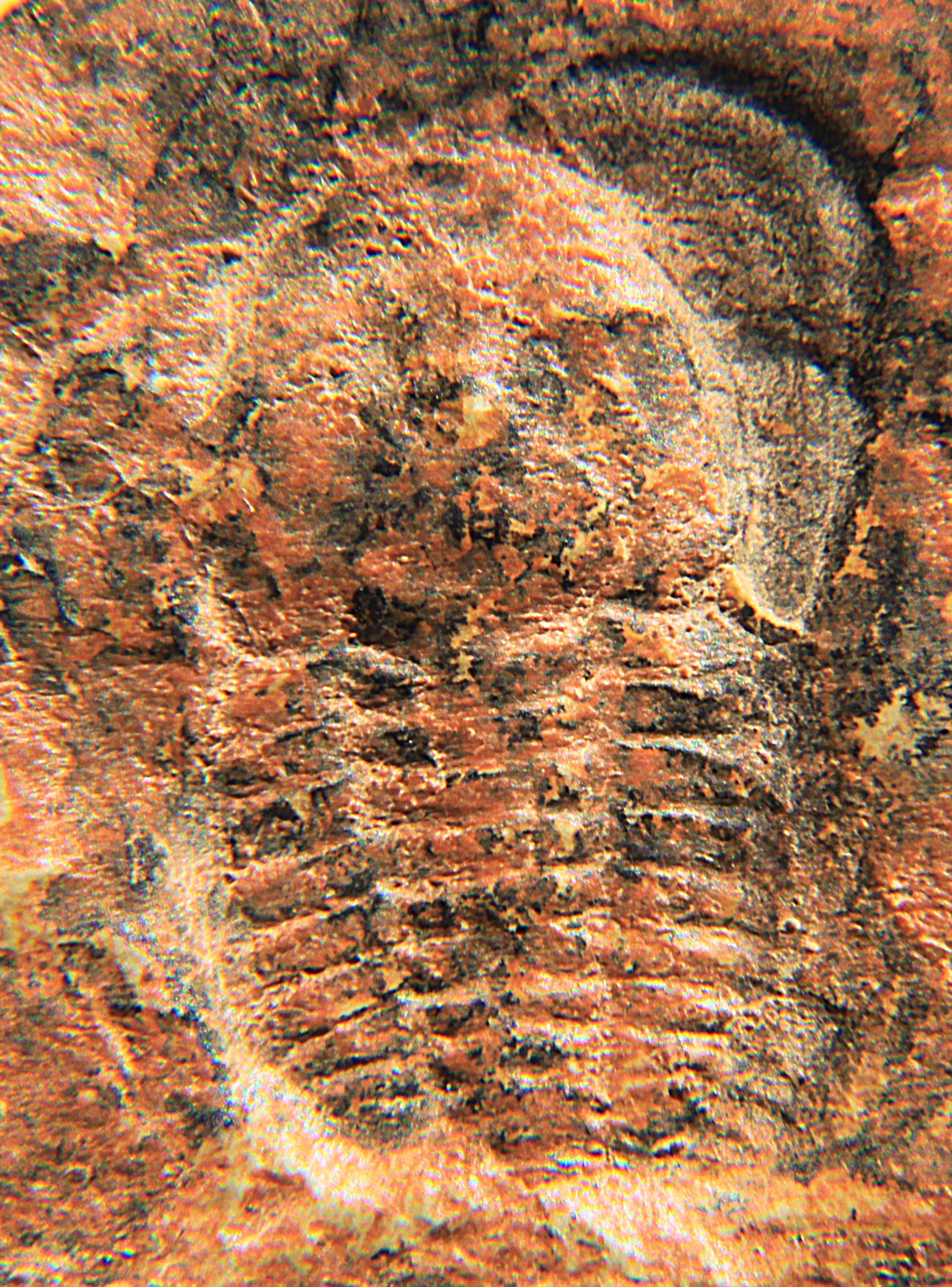
- Daguinaspis sp.

Scientific classification
- Kingdom: Animalia
- Phylum: Arthropoda
- Clade: †Artiopoda
- Class: †Trilobita
- Order: †Redlichiida
- Family: †Daguinaspididae
- Genus: †Daguinaspis; Hupé and Abadie, 1950

Species
- D. ambroggii Hupé, 1953 (Type); D. subabadiei Geyer, Landing & Heldmaier, 1995

= Daguinaspis =

Daguinaspis Temporal range: Lower Cambrian (Lower Atdabanian)

Extinct trilobite genus

Daguinaspis is an early Cambrian trilobite genus found in Morocco. Like the closely related Choubertella and Wolynaspis, but unlike any other Fallotaspidoidea, it lacks genal spines.

== Distribution ==
Cambrian of the Anti-Atlas, Morocco, 30.4° N, 8.8° W (Daguinaspis trilobite zone, Tazemmourt Section and Tiout Section. Amouslek Formation, Middle Atdabanian (520.0 - 516.0 Ma) )

== Ecology ==
Daguinaspis occurs together with the trilobites Marsaisia robauxi and Resserops bourgini, and the brachiopod Brevipelta chouberti (Tazemmourt), and also with the problematic Microschedia amphitrite (Tiout).
