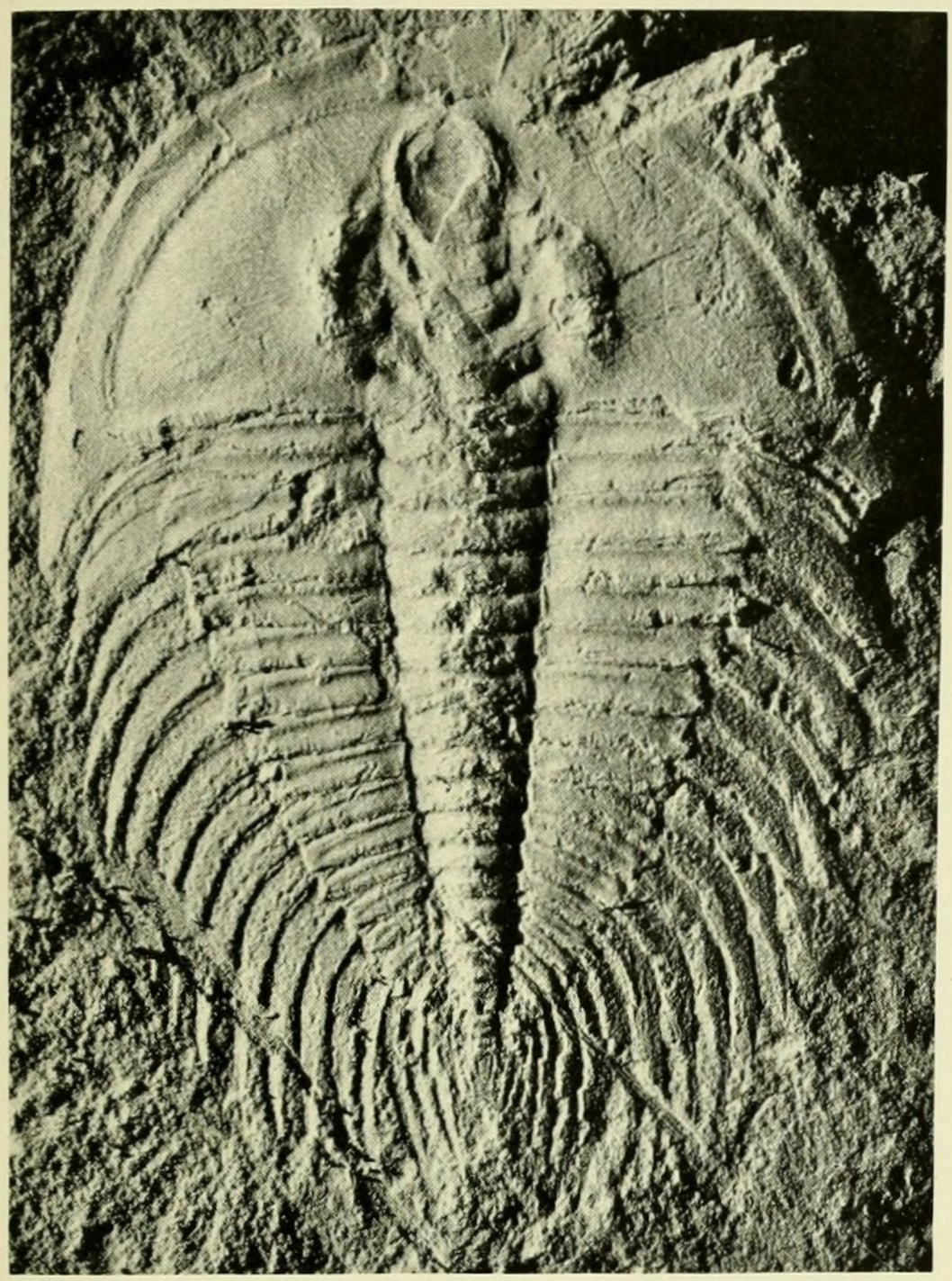
- Nevadella eucharis, type specimen

Scientific classification
- Kingdom: Animalia
- Phylum: Arthropoda
- Clade: †Artiopoda
- Class: †Trilobita
- Order: †Redlichiida
- Family: †Nevadiidae
- Genus: †Nevadella; Raw, 1936

Species
- N. eucharis (Walcott, 1913) (type) synonym Callavia eucharis; N. baculenta (Fritz, 1972); N. cartlandi (Raw in Walcott, 1910) synonyms Callavia cartlandi, C. cobboldi, C. brevioculata; N. keelensis Abe, 2010; N. mountjoyi (Fritz, 1972); N. perfecta (Walcott, 1913) synonym Callavia perfecta

= Nevadella =

Nevadella Temporal range: Late Atdabanian, 524–522 Ma

Extinct genus of trilobites

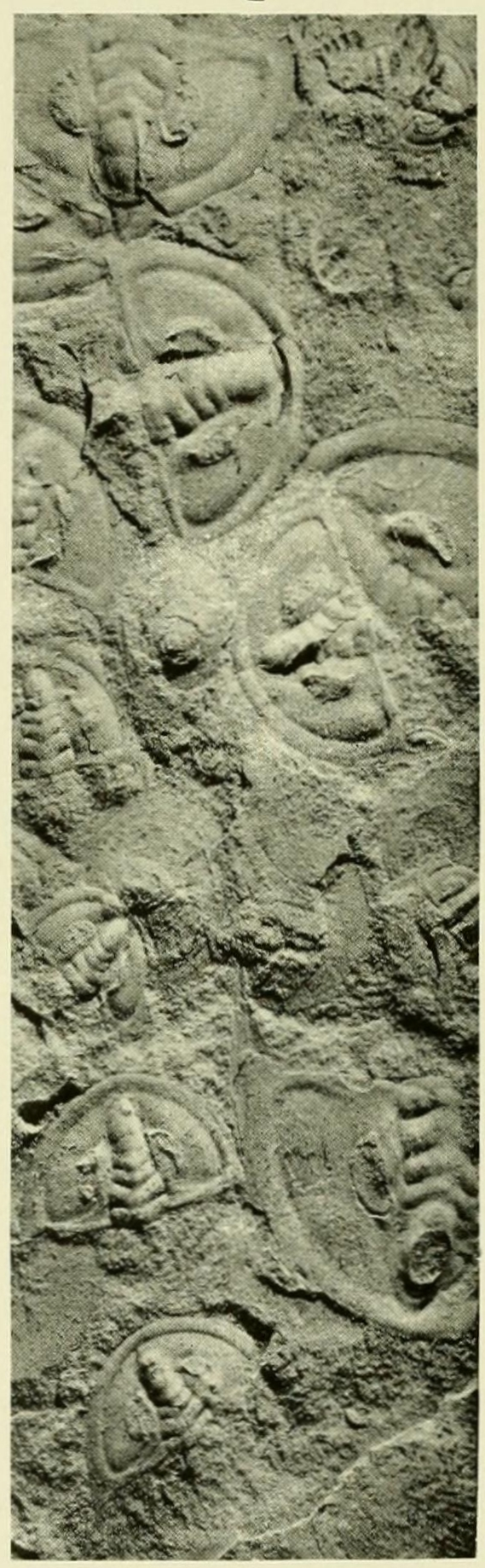
Several cephalons of Nevadella perfecta, with undamaged glabellas, also showing the strikingly wide cephalic margin

Nevadella is an extinct genus of trilobites, fossil marine arthropods, with species of average size (about 5 centimetres or 2.0 inches long). It lived during the late Atdabanian stage, which lasted from 530 to 524 million years ago during the early part of the Cambrian Period.

== Etymology ==
The name is derived from Nevadia, a related genus.

== Taxonomy ==
Nevadia predates Nevadella and may include its direct ancestor.

=== Species previously assigned to Nevadella ===
- N. burri = Pleisionevadella burri

== Description ==
The body of Nevadella is very flat dorso-ventrally. The general outline of its thin, lightly calcified exoskeleton is inverted drop-shaped. The front is rounded, widest at the back of the headshield (or cephalon), and tapering from there to an eventually rounded termination. The central area of the cephalon (or glabella) is distinctly tapered forward, sides slightly concave, but wedging out slightly in the frontal half and with a rounded front (like the silhouette of a slim pawn). The glabella and the frontal margin almost or entirely touch (in jargon: the preglabellar field is short or absent). Cephalic margin at least as wide as the most frontal thoracal segment. The thorax has 17 to 23 segments, gradually diminishing in size. The pleural spines are long and sickle-shaped. The tailshield (or pygidium) is very small and subquadrate in shape.

== Distribution ==
Fossils of Nevadella have been found in the late Atdabanian of the USA (California, Nevada) and Canada (Cordilleran region).

- N. eucharis is known from the Middle Member of the Poleta Formation, Esmeralda County, Nevada, USA.
- N. keelensis is known from the Sekwi Formation, Northwest Territories, Canada.
- N. mountjoyi is known from the Mural Formation, north slope of Mount Mumm, Alberta, Canada.
- N. perfecta is known from the Mahto Formation, Mumm Peak on the west side of Hitka Pass, western Alberta, Canada.

== Ecology ==
Contemporary taxa that also occur in the so-called "Nevadella" Zone include Esmeraldina, Holmiella, Palmettaspis, Bradyfallotaspis, Geraldinella, Paranevadella, Nevadia, Buenellus, and Cirquella.

== Habitat ==
Nevadella species were probably marine bottom dwellers, like all Olenellina.
