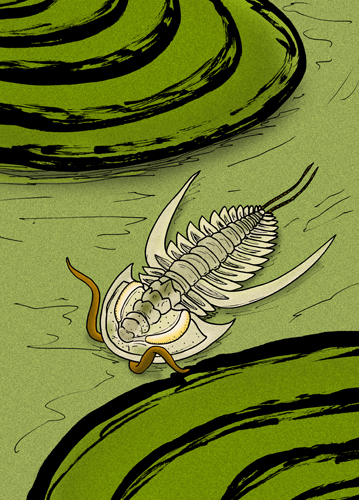
- Reconstruction of A. hupei

Scientific classification
- Kingdom: Animalia
- Phylum: Arthropoda
- Clade: †Artiopoda
- Class: †Trilobita
- Order: †Redlichiida
- Family: †Archaeaspididae
- Genus: †Archaeaspis; Repina in Khomentovskii and Repina, 1965 non Archaeaspis Ivantsov, 2001 = Archaeaspinus Ivantsov, 2007

Species
- A. hupei Repina in Khomentovskii and Repina, 1965 (Type); A. nelsoni Lieberman, 2002; A. macropleuron Lieberman, 2002

= Archaeaspis =

Archaeaspis Temporal range: Late Atdabanian

Extinct redlichiid trilobites from the Cambrian

Archaeaspis is an extinct genus of redlichiid trilobites. It lived during the late Atdabanian stage, which lasted from 521 to 514 million years ago during the early part of the Cambrian Period. The first specimens were first found in Siberia, where they were originally thought to have been endemic. Later, though, more specimen were found in the Inyo Mountains in Southern California. An Ediacarian proarticulatan was given the same name, Archaeaspis Ivantsov, 2001. This is however a junior homonym. The name Archaeaspis Repina in Khomentovskii and Repina, 1965, for the trilobite has priority. The new valid name for the proarticulate is Archaeaspinus Ivantsov, 2007.

== Etymology ==
The genus name is the combination of the Ancient Greek ἀρχαῖος (archaīos) meaning "ancient" and ἀσπίς (aspis) meaning "shield". The names of the species have the following derivations.

- A. hupei is named in honor of Pierre Hupé, a distinguished French paleontologist.
- A. nelsoni in named in honor of Clem Nelson, emeritus professor, who worked at the University of California at Los Angeles, and at the White Mountain Research Station. He collected the material the specimens the description of this species is based upon.
- A. macropleuron is the combination of the Greek words μακρος (makros) meaning "large" and πλευρών (pleuron) meaning "rib", named for the macropleural spine of the 3rd thorax segment in this species.

== Distribution ==
- A. hupei is found on the Siberian platform.
- A. nelsoni was collected in the Lower Cambrian of California, USA (probably Nevadella-zone), Inyo County; on a small hill just south of the east-west road leading to Silver Canyon, Montenegro Member of the Campito Formation, Blanco Mountains; and on a south facing dip slope on the North side of a small east-west canyon on the east side of the road, Campito Formation, near Bishop.
- A. macropleuron occurs in the Lower Cambrian of California, USA (probably Nevadella-zone), Inyo County; on a small hill just south of the east-west road leading to Silver Canyon, Montenegro Member of the Campito Formation, Blanco Mountains; Campito Formation near Waucoba Springs.

== Description ==
As with most early trilobites, Archaeaspis has an almost flat exoskeleton that is only thinly calcified, and has crescent-shaped eye ridges. As part of the Olenellina suborder, Archaeaspis lack dorsal sutures. The superfamily Fallotaspidoidea, to which Archaeaspis belongs can be distinguished from all other Olenellina by features of the cephalon and in particular the glabella. The glabella tapers forward. The frontal lobe of the glabella (because it is counted from the back, it is numbered L4) is as long as the most backward lobe (L0), less than in the other Olenellina. The eye ridges (or ocular lobes) contact, but do not merge with, the entire frontal margin of the glabella. In Archaeaspis the frontal lobe of the glabella (L4) does not contact the anterior border furrow, but is connected with it by a ridge at midline (called plectrum). There is an obvious ridge that crosses the area between the ocular lobe and the glabella backward and slightly outward at approximately 10° (called interocular ridge).

== Species key ==
| 1 | The ridge bordering the head shield (or anterior border) right in front of the sides of the glabella is at most 1¼× as wide as the most backward lobe of the glabella (occipital ring or L0). The anterior border is rounded across. The eye ridge (or ocular lobe) is directed backwards and slightly outwards (the line between the posterior tip of the ocular lobe and the junction of the interior margin and the frontal lobe of the glabella has an angle of at most 20° with the midline). → 2 |
| - | The anterior border approximately 1½× as wide as L0. The anterior border is flattened dorsally. The tangent of the ocular lobe is directed backwards and substantially outward at 35°- 45°. → Archaeaspis hupei |
| 2 | The lateral spines on the third segment of the thorax (T3) are comparable in size to those of neighboring segments. The distance between the anterior cephalic border and the frontal lobe of the glabella (or preglabellar field) is ¼-¾× the length of L0. The segments of the thorax axis are smooth or have a faint node. → Archaeaspis macropleura |
| - | T3 carries long pleural spines that extend the length of the thorax, and the spine on T4 is almost absent. The preglabellar field is ¾-1¼× the length of L0. The thorax axis carries distinct nodes. → Archaeaspis nelsoni |
