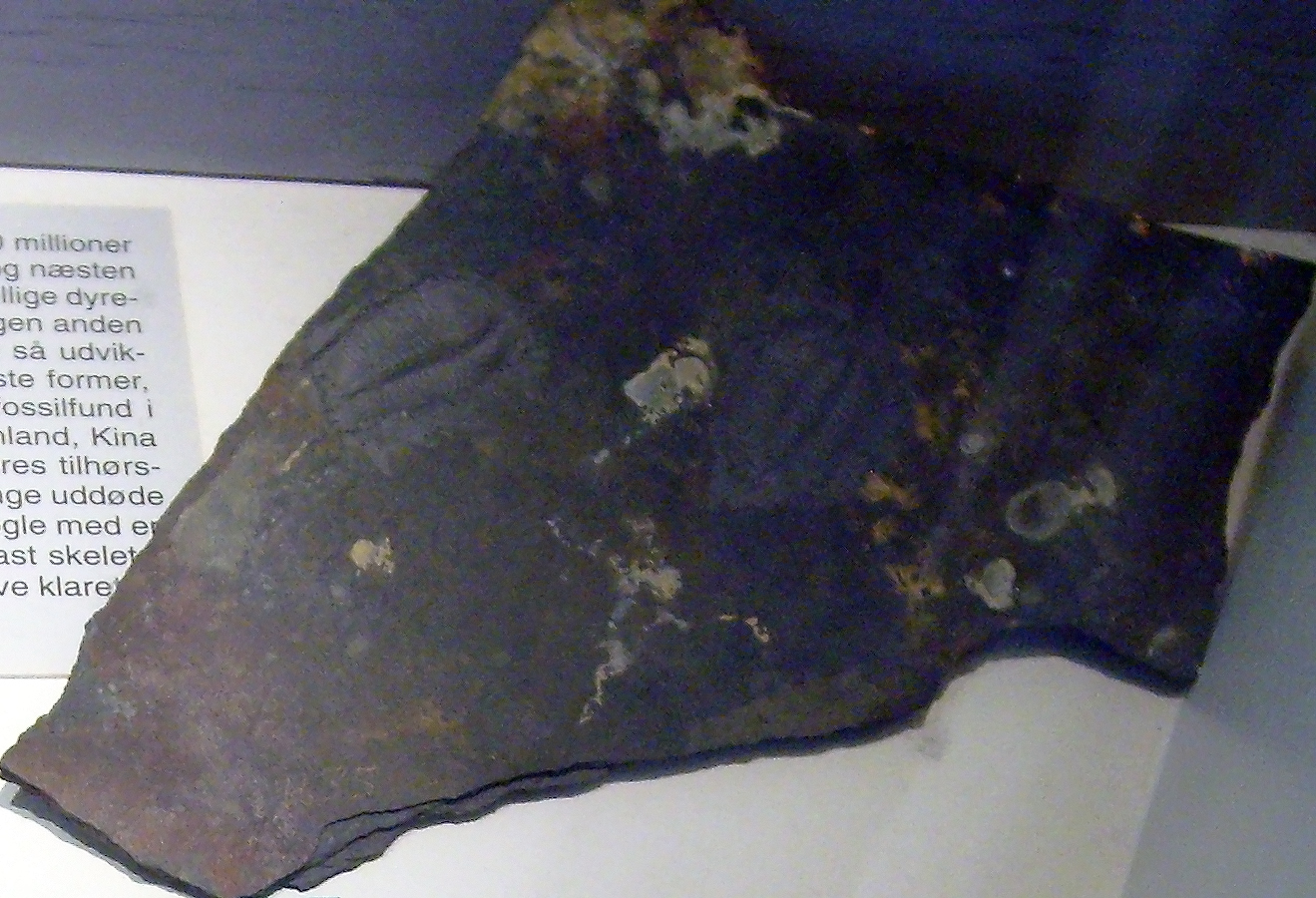
- Buenellus higginsi fossils at the Geological Museum, Copenhagen

Scientific classification
- Kingdom: Animalia
- Phylum: Arthropoda
- Clade: †Artiopoda
- Class: †Trilobita
- Order: †Redlichiida
- Family: †Nevadiidae
- Genus: †Buenellus; Blaker, 1988
- Species: †B. higginsi

Binomial name
- †Buenellus higginsi Blaker, 1988

= Buenellus =

Buenellus higginsi Temporal range: Atdabanian

Species of trilobite (fossil)

Buenellus higginsi is an average size (about 5 centimetres or 2.0 inches) trilobite, which lived during the Lower Cambrian period, in what is now North-West Greenland. It is a prominent member of the Sirius Passet fauna. Buenellus higginsi is the only known species in the genus Buenellus (i.e., the genus is monotypic).

== Etymology ==
The genus name is a contraction of Buen, from the formation in which it was first collected, and Olenellus, a somewhat related trilobite genus. The species specific epithet honors A. Higgins, who discovered the Sirius Passet Lagerstätte in 1984 during the Geological Survey of Greenland.

== Description ==
The general outline of the body is rounded n the front third, parallel sided in the middle third, and progressively tapering backwards in the back third, ending at an angle of approximately 45° with the midline. The headshield (or cephalon is approximately 5/8× as long as it is wide. The (in this case only slightly) vaulted central axis of the head or glabella tapers gently forward and does not reach the anterior margin. The outer backside of the cephalon (or genal angle) has short genal spines. The thorax has 17 or 18 articulating segments, maintaining width or widening slightly backwards up to the 8th segment, then tapering posteriorly. The posterior segment may be fused with the anterior part of a simple and small pygidium. Pleural spines are short, and the pleural regions are only slightly wider than the axis.

=== Differences with other Nevadiidae ===
The general shape of the body of other species in the Nevadid family (like Nevadia and Nevadella) is shorter, with the greatest width across the back of the cephalon, and the entire thorax tapering backwards.

== Distribution ==
Buenellus higginsi has been collected from early to middle Atdabanian deposits at the lower Buen Formation (“Nevadella” Zone), Sirius Passet lagerstätte at its junction with the J. P. Koch Fjord, Peary Land, Greenland 82°47.6′N 42°13.7′W. It has also been reported from Novaya Zemlya, Russian Republic.

== Ecology ==
Mineral-filled gut tracts in B. higginsi suggest they were not filled with sediment at the time of burial, and that the species was a predator of soft prey.

Healed injuries, some of which are the result of unsuccessful predaceous attacks, are not uncommon in B. higginsi. Carnivory on B. higginsi is also implied by the remains of anomalocaridids and other potential predators.

Other exoskeletons show evidence of post-mortem disruption, perhaps because of scavenging. Buenellus higginsi, one of the earliest known trilobites from Laurentia, seems to have played an important role in the Sirius Passet ecosystem, serving both as predator on, and prey for, contemporary animals.

== Habitat ==
Buenellus higginsi was probably a marine bottom dweller, that lived in deeper water. This may be deduced from the dominance of eyeless forms and the absence of seaweeds at the collection site.

== Soft tissue preservation ==
Many specimens of B. higginsi show some form of exceptionally preserved, non-biomineralised tissue. Structures interpreted as alimentary tracts and probable digestive glands are commonly preserved. The slender antennas are rarely preserved.
