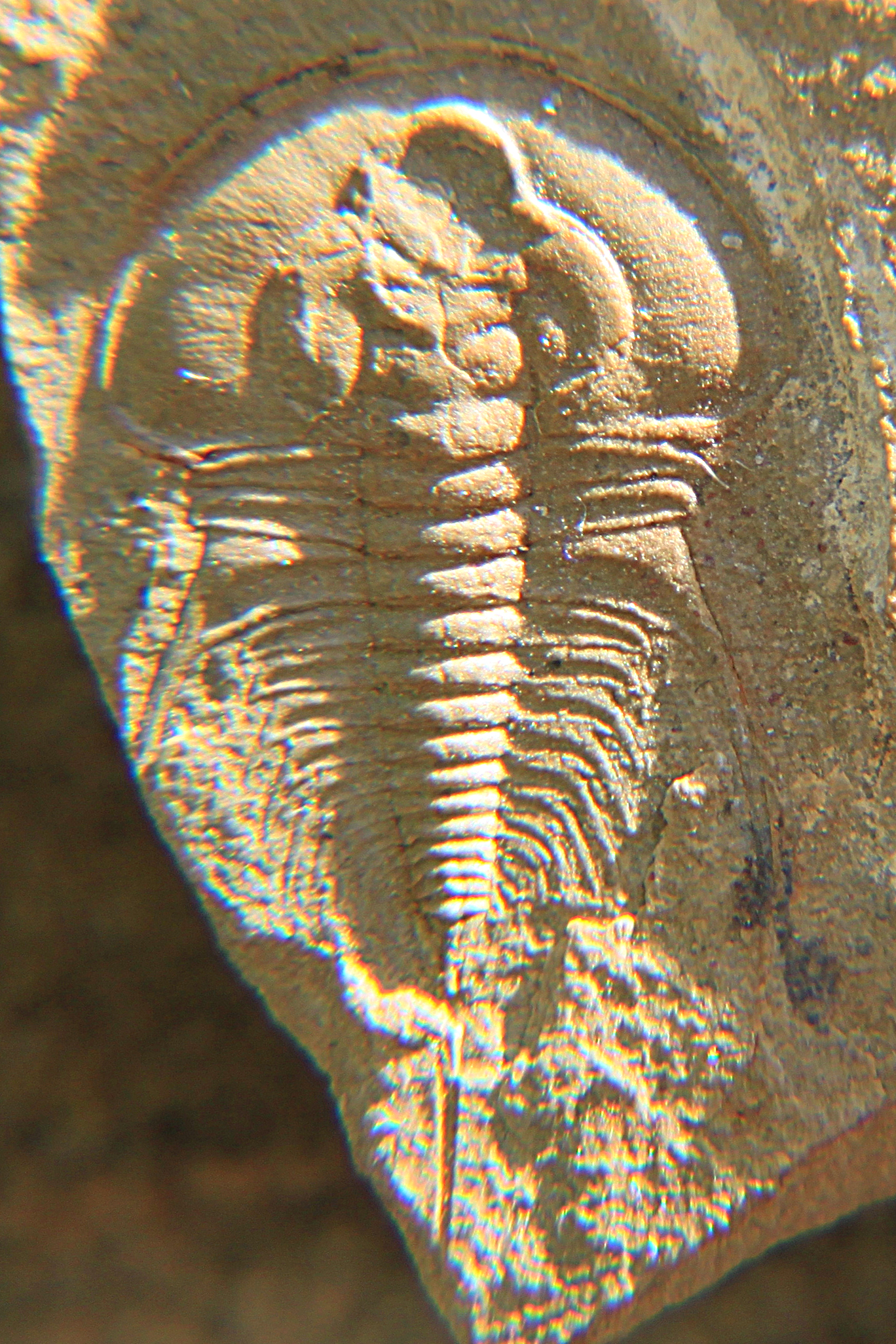
- Olenellus gilberti

Scientific classification
- Kingdom: Animalia
- Phylum: Arthropoda
- Clade: †Artiopoda
- Class: †Trilobita
- Order: †Redlichiida
- Suborder: †Olenellina
- Superfamily: †Olenelloidea; Walcott, 1890

Families
- Biceratopsidae; Holmiidae; Olenellidae; stem group genera: Elliptocephala; Fritzolenellus; Laudonia; Mummaspis; Wanneria

= Olenelloidea =

Olenelloidea Temporal range: Botomian/Toyonian (Olenellus-zone)

Extinct superfamily of trilobites

The Olenelloidea are a superfamily of trilobites, a group of extinct marine arthropods. They lived during the late Lower Cambrian and species occurred on all paleocontinents.

== Taxonomy ==
Palmer and Repina assigned Gabriellus and Callavia to the Olenelloidea, but the ocular lobes in these two genera circumscribe the entire lateral border of the frontal lobe of the glabella, and thus, do not belong to this superfamily, but to the Judomioidea. Geyer assigned Cambropallas to the Olenelloidea, but it lacks the diagnostic features and appears to be closely related to Andalusiana, and is now considered to be an advanced member of the Nevadioidea.

== Distribution ==
In western Laurentia Fallotaspididae and Archaeaspididae proceed the first Olenelloidea. The Holmiidae occur at the late Atdabanian, and are contemporary with the Nevadioidea. They are followed by Biceratopsidae and Olenellidae.

== Description ==
As with most early trilobites, the Olenelloidea have an almost flat exoskeleton, that is only thinly calcified, and has crescent-shaped eye ridges. As part of the Olenellina suborder, the Olenelloidea lack dorsal sutures. The superfamily can be distinguished from all other Olenellina by features of the cephalon and in particular the glabella. The backward portion of the third lateral lobe of the glabella counted from the back (L3) bulges laterally relative to the first lateral lobe (L1). The front end of the eye lobe (or ocular lobe) is connected only to the back half of the frontal lobe (AL or L4) of the glabella, and merges smoothly with it (rather than merely contacting it). The ocular lobe consists of an inner and outer band.
