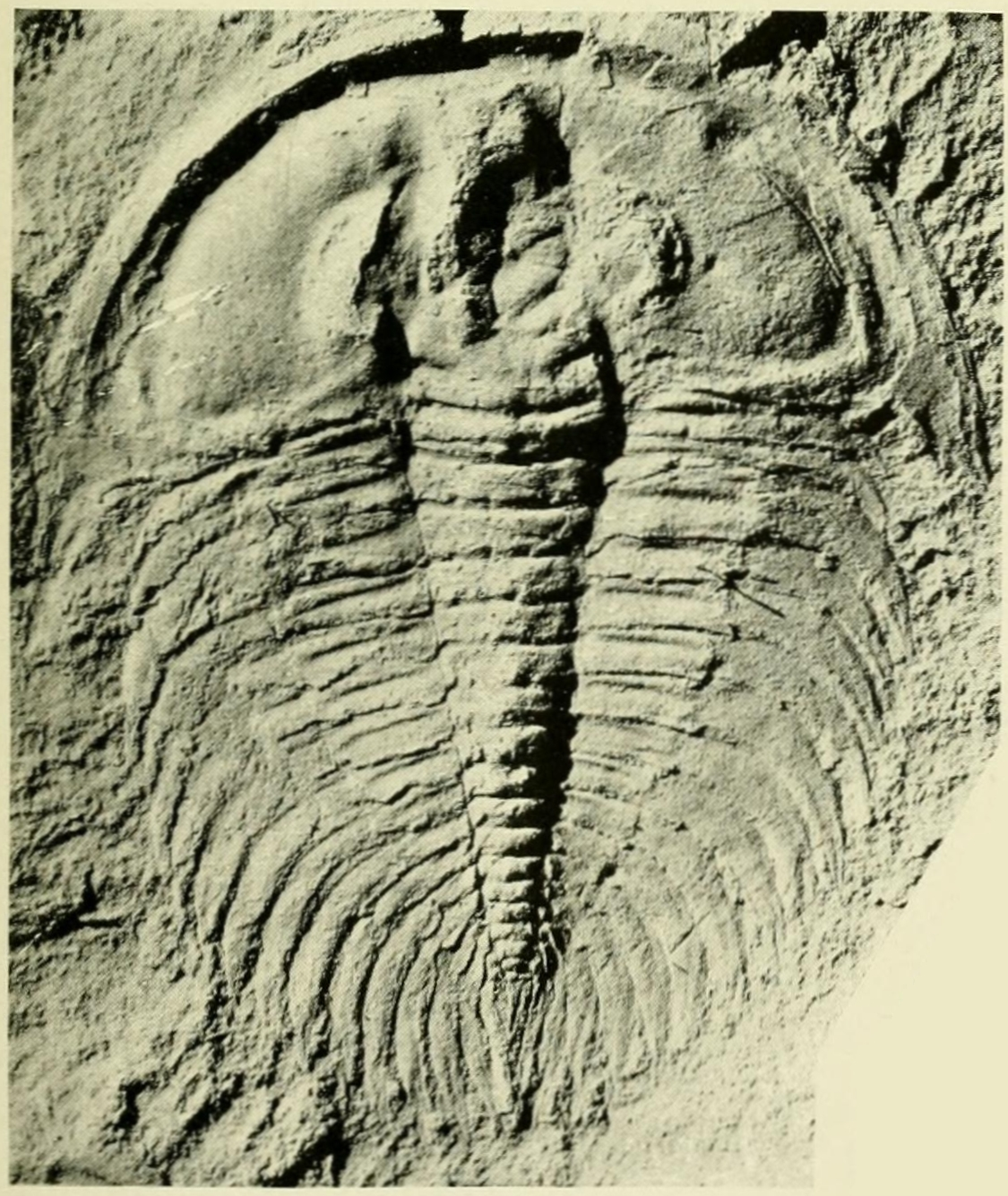
- Callavia

Scientific classification
- Kingdom: Animalia
- Phylum: Arthropoda
- Clade: †Artiopoda
- Class: †Trilobita
- Order: †Redlichiida
- Superfamily: †Judomioidea
- Genus: †Callavia; Matthew, 1897

Species
- C. broeggeri Walcott, 1890; C. callavei Raw in Walcott, 1910; C. choffati Collantes et al., 2021

Synonyms
- Callavia crosbyi- synonym of C. broeggeri; Nevadia crosbyi- synonym of C. broeggeri; Olenellus (Holmia) broegeri- synonym of C. broeggeri; Olenellus (Mesonacis) broegeri- synonym of C. broeggeri; Paradoxides choffati- synonym of C. choffati; Callavia hastata- synonym of C. callavei; Callavia? lotzei- synonym of C. choffati

= Callavia =

Callavia Temporal range: Atdabanian

Callavia is an extinct genus of trilobite arthropods. Callavia lived during the late Atdabanian stage, which lasted from 530 to 524 million years ago during the early part of the Cambrian Period in what are today Canada and the United States.

== Taxonomy ==
The position of Callavia in relation to other Olenellina has shifted repeatedly over time. Initially it was assigned to the Holmiinae by Pierre Hupé, and was later moved back and forth to the Callaviinae. Lieberman, however, argues Callavia is a basal member of the Judomioidea.

Reassigned Species

- C. bicensis = Elliptocephala walcotti
- C. breviloba = Olenellina sp. indet.
- C. brevioculata = Nevadella cartlandi
- C. burri = Nevadia burri
- C. cartlandi = Nevadella cartlandi
- C. cobboldi = Nevadella cartlandi
- C. eucharis = Nevadella eucharis
- C.? nevadensis = Olenellus nevadensis
- C. perfecta = Nevadella perfecta

== Distribution ==
C. broeggeri is known from the Lower Cambrian of Newfoundland (Brigus Formation, Branchian Series, Conception Bay), Nova Scotia (between Docters Brook and Malignant Brook, northernmost Antigonish Highlands), Canada, and Massachusetts, USA (Weymouth Formation, Pearl street, North Weymouth, and probably Hoppin Hill Reservoir, North Attleboro). C. choffati is known from the Iberian Peninsula in the Elvas Municipality in Portugal and in several localities in the Huelva Province, Spain. C. callavei is found in the Comley Limestone in Shropshire, England.

== Ecology ==
C. broeggeri occurs together with the bracihiopods Sunnaginia imbricata and Eccentrotheca kanesia, and the agnostid Serrodiscus bellimarginatus.

== See also ==
- Nevadella
