= Gigantopygus =

Gigantopygus Temporal range: Early Botomian

Scientific classification
- Kingdom: Animalia
- Phylum: Arthropoda
- Clade: †Artiopoda
- Class: †Trilobita
- Order: †Redlichiida
- Family: †Gigantopygidae
- Genus: †Gigantopygus; Hupé, 1953

Type species
- Gigantopygus papillatus

Species
- Gigantopygus angustalatus Hupé, 1954; Gigantopygus papillatus Hupé, 1953; Gigantopygus bondoni Hupé, 1954

Gigantopygus is an extinct genus of redlichiid trilobites. It lived during the early part of the Botomian stage, a faunal stage during the Early Cambrian, which lasted from approximately 524 to 518.5 million years ago. Fossils are found in Morocco and Spain
