= Fallotaspidella =

Fallotaspidella Temporal range: Lower Cambrian (Atdabanian)

Scientific classification
- Kingdom: Animalia
- Phylum: Arthropoda
- Clade: †Artiopoda
- Class: †Trilobita
- Order: †Redlichiida
- Family: †Archaeaspididae
- Genus: †Fallotaspidella; Repina, 1961

Type species
- Fallotaspidella musatovi Repina, 1961

Species
- F. chesenica Korobov 1980; F. lata Repina, 1961; F. musatovi Repina, 1961

Extinct genus of trilobites

Fallotaspidella is an extinct genus of redlichiid trilobites. It lived during the late Atdabanian stage, which lasted from 530 to 524 million years ago during the early part of the Cambrian Period.

== Distribution ==
The type species, F. musatovi was collected from the Lower Cambrian of Siberia (later Atdabanian, southern Siberian fold belt, Altay-Sayan region, Lena Stage of the Batenevskiy Ridge).

== Taxonomy ==
Fallotaspidella is a derived member of the superfamily "Fallotaspidoidea". Fallotaspidella is closest to the trilobites with dorsal cephalic sutures, such as Bigotina and Lemdadella, making it pivotal in the understanding of the development of these sutures. Of all the other Fallotaspoids Archaeaspis is most related to Fallotaspidella.
