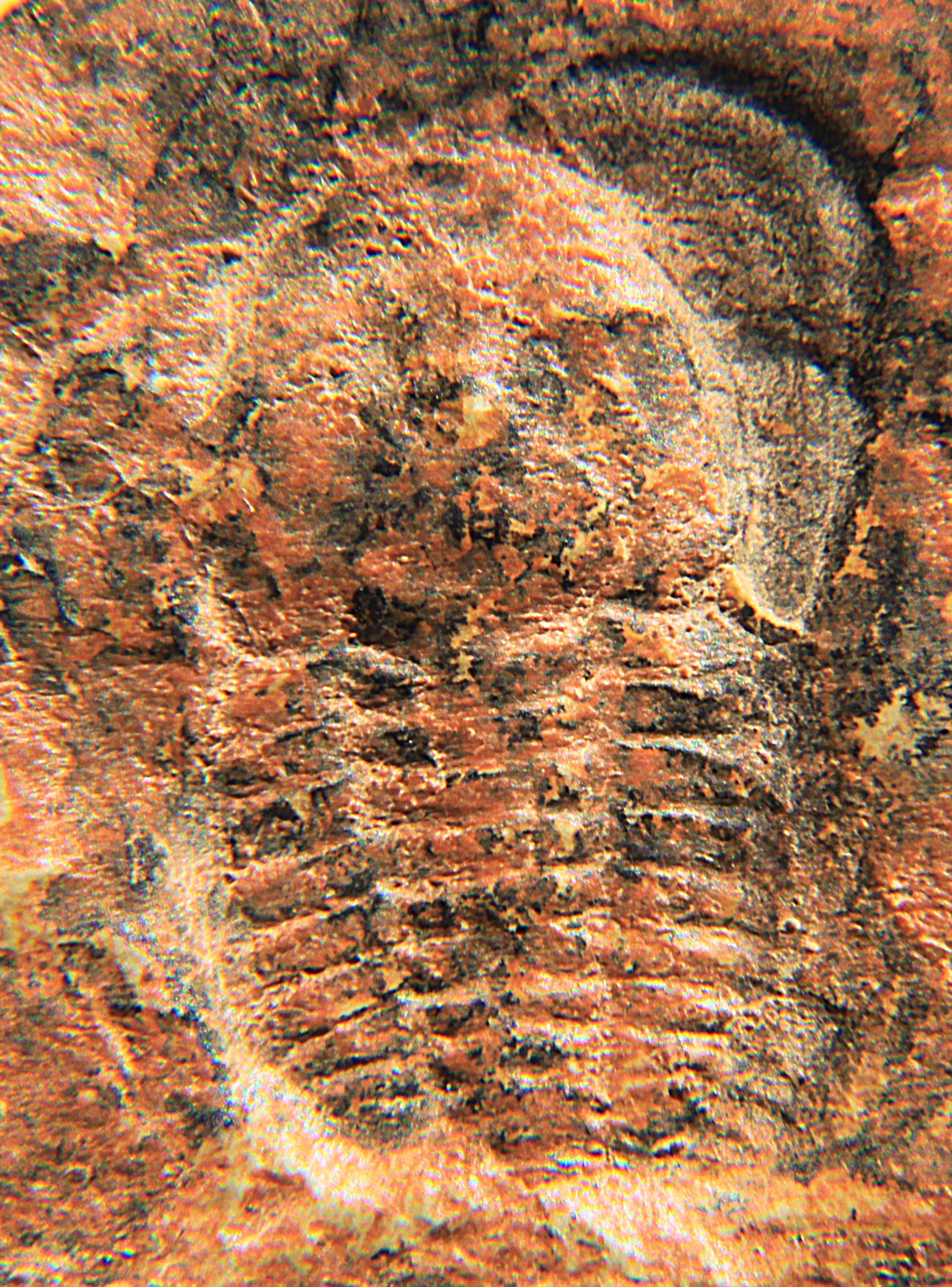
- Daguinaspis sp.

Scientific classification
- Kingdom: Animalia
- Phylum: Arthropoda
- Clade: †Artiopoda
- Class: †Trilobita
- Order: †Redlichiida
- Superfamily: †Fallotaspidoidea
- Family: †Daguinaspididae

Genera
- Daguinaspis; Choubertella; Eofallotaspis; Pelmanaspis; Profallotaspis; Wolynaspis

= Daguinaspididae =

Daguinaspididae Temporal range: Lower Cambrian (Lower Atdabanian to Botomian)

Family of trilobites

The Daguinaspididae is family of early Cambrian trilobites found in Morocco, Ukraine, and Siberia.
