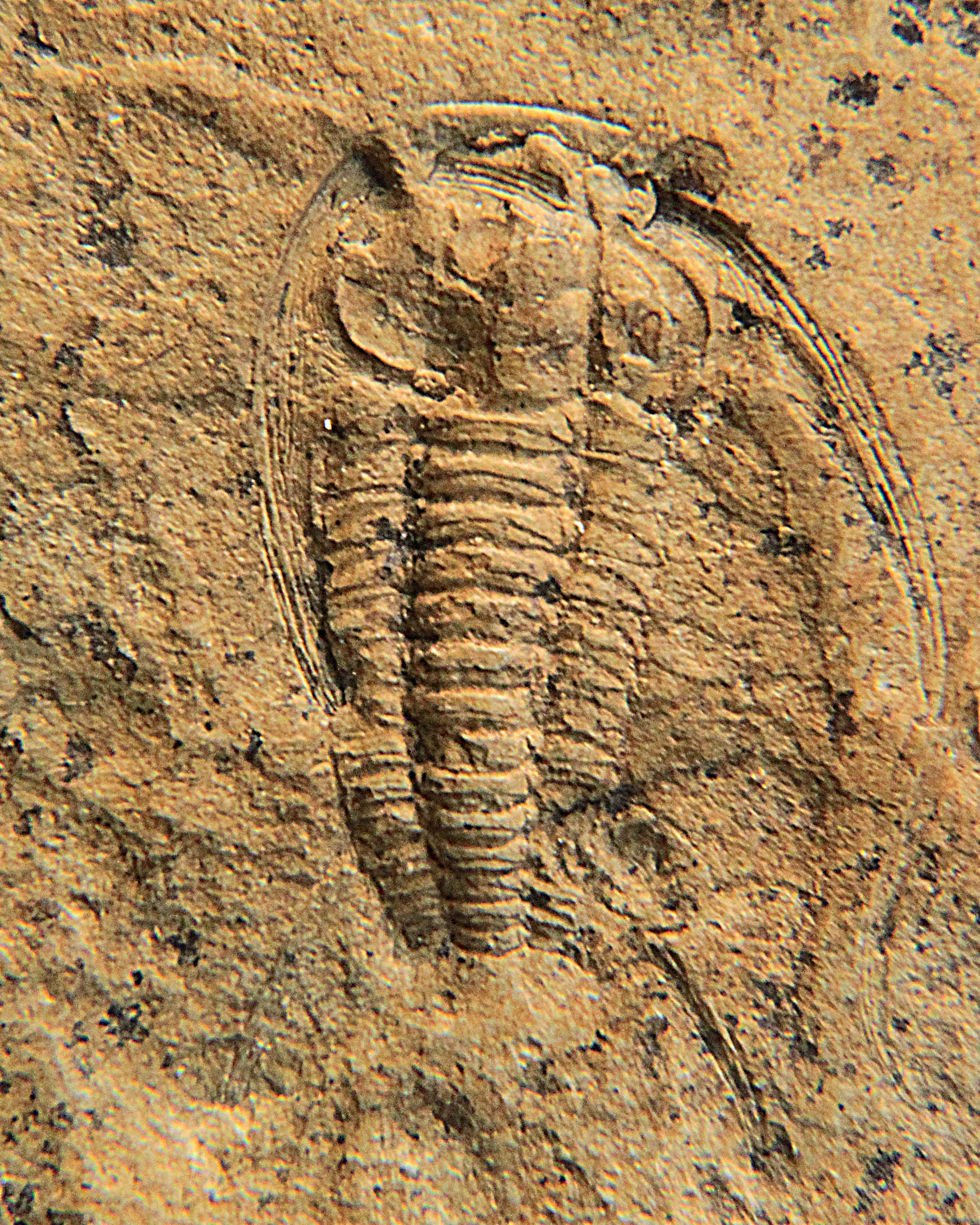
- Richterops falloti from Morocco

Scientific classification
- Kingdom: Animalia
- Phylum: Arthropoda
- Clade: †Artiopoda
- Class: †Trilobita
- Order: †Redlichiida
- Family: †Saukiandidae
- Genus: †Richterops; Hupé, 1953

= Richterops =

Richterops Temporal range: Atdabanian/Botomian

Richterops is an extinct genus of trilobite arthropods. The genus lived during the middle of the Atdabanian or the early part of the Botomian stage, which lasted from approximately 524 to 518.5 million years ago. This faunal stage was part of the second half of the Lower Cambrian. It has been found in southern Morocco. It can be recognised by the long spines of the headshield that are a smooth continuation of the frontal edge, and the enlarged spines on the 11th segment of the thorax.

== Distribution ==
Lower Cambrian of Southern Morocco (Daguinaspis and Resserops-zone near Tazemmourt, Amouslek and Ouijane).

== Taxonomy ==
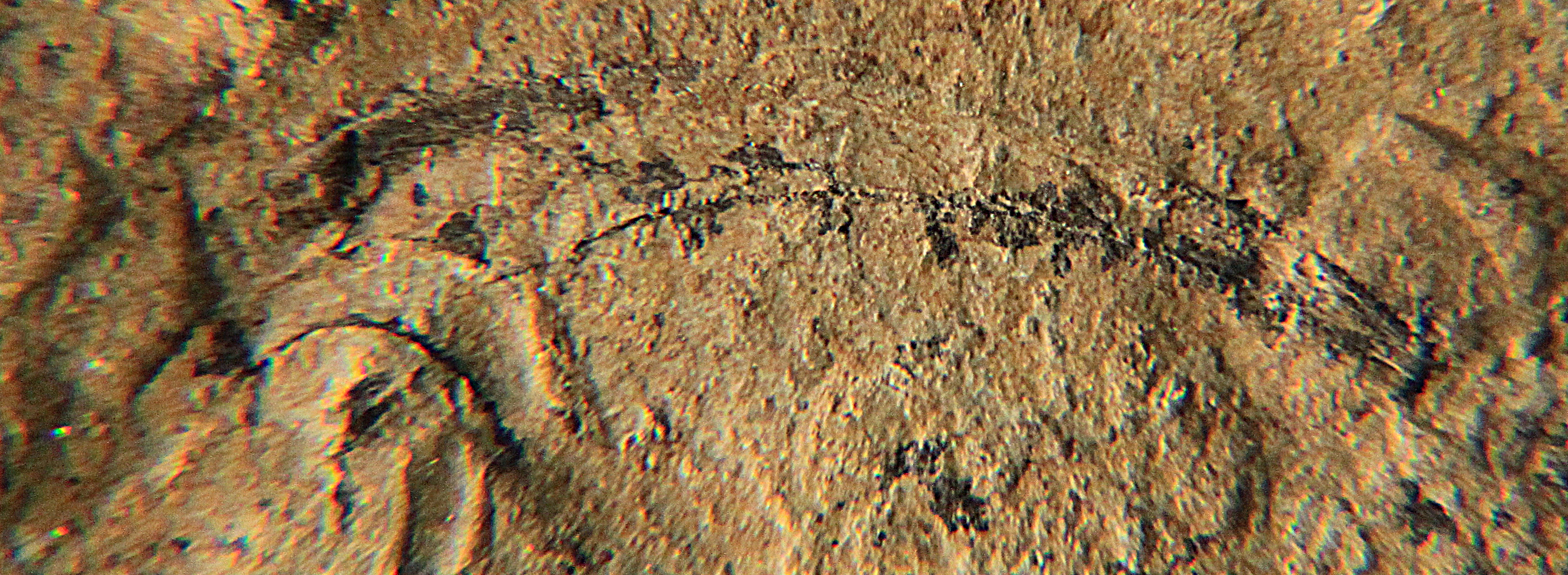
The "free cheek" or librigena of Richterops, showing a very narrow extra-ocular area

Richterops falloti was originally described as Resserops falloti. The Treatise considers Resserops and Richterops subgenera of Perrector, which name was proposed by Hupé in the same publication, but appears above it and would have preference. Later publications use Resserops and Richterops however as separate genera.

== Description ==
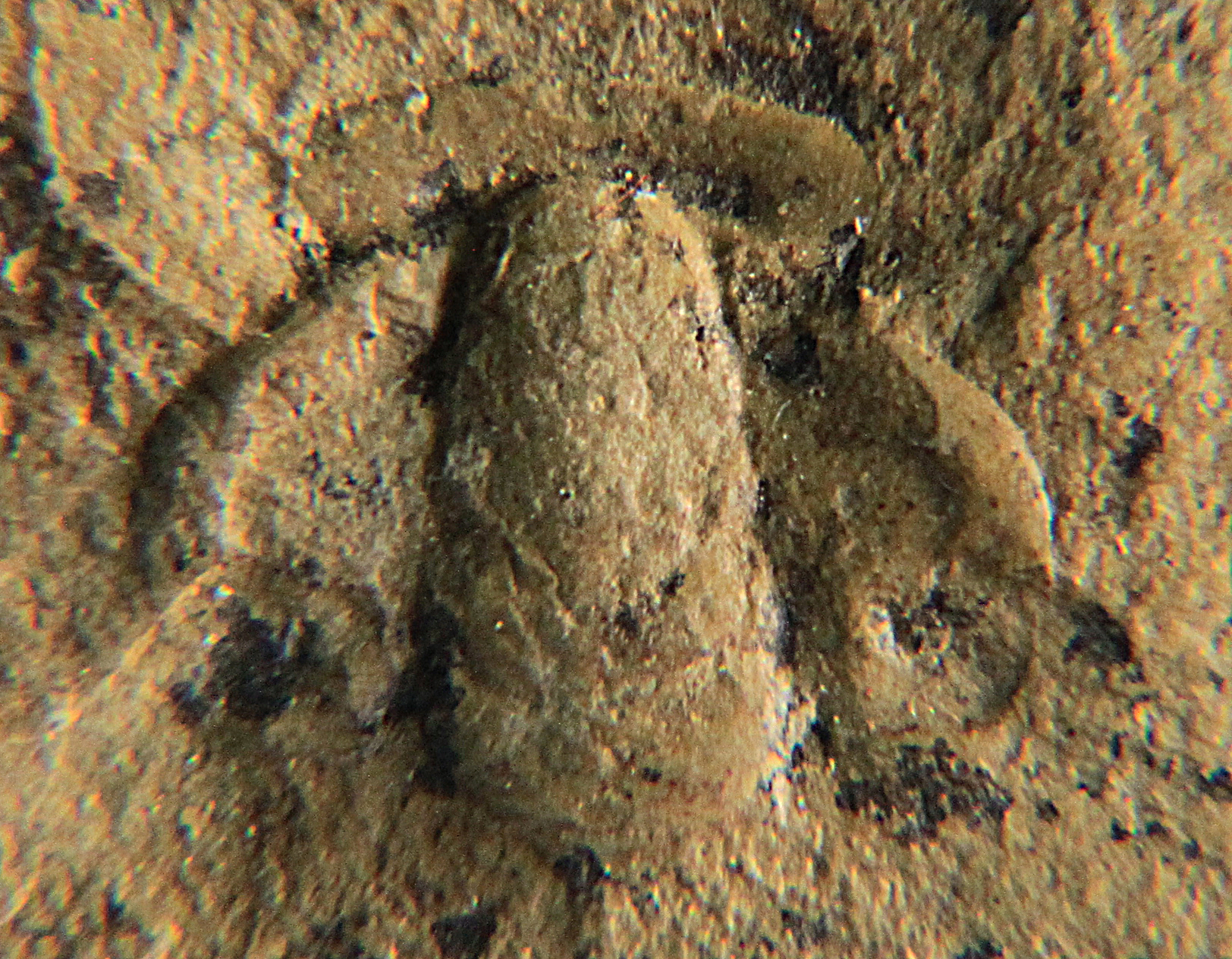
A cranidium, the remainder of the cephalon after the librigenae have broken away

As with most early trilobites, Richterops has an almost flat exoskeleton, that is only thinly calcified, and has crescent-shaped eye ridges. As a representative of the Redlichiina suborder, the headshield (or cephalon) has sutures where the exoskeleton ruptures to assist in moulting. The cephalon is approximately ovate, almost 1½× wider than long. There is no space between the raised axis (or glabella) and the raised ridge (or anterior border) that defines the contour of the cephalon (in jargon: the preglabellar field is absent). The eye ridges are large, extend outward and arch backward near their tips. The cephalon carries long relatively slender spines (or genal spines) that are a smooth continuation of the anterior border. The genal spines are connected about half of the length of the cephalon (or well-advanced). The tips of the genal spines are parallel to the midline, but further out than their base. The border of the cephalon and the spines have up to 7 parallel, but slightly wavey ridges on the underside (or ventrally). The thorax has 14 segments, the 11th segment (counted from the front) carries large spines at its tips, shorter than the genal spines and shorter than the thorax axis, but still extending beyond the pygidium. The tailshield (or pygidium) has a smooth border, is large for a redlichiida, (about half as long as the cephalon), both the axis and pleural regions of the pygidium have several recognisable segments.
