= Abadiella =

Abadiella Temporal range: Lower Cambrian

Scientific classification
- Kingdom: Animalia
- Phylum: Arthropoda
- Clade: †Artiopoda
- Class: †Trilobita
- Order: †Redlichiida
- Family: †Abadiellidae
- Genus: †Abadiella; Hupé, 1953

Extinct genus of trilobite

Abadiella is an extinct genus of Trilobite from the lower Cambrian of Gondwana. It was described by Hupé in 1953.
