= Abadiellidae =

Scientific classification
- Kingdom: Animalia
- Phylum: Arthropoda
- Clade: †Artiopoda
- Class: †Trilobita
- Order: †Redlichiida
- Suborder: †Redlichiina
- Superfamily: †Redlichioidea
- Family: †Abadiellidae; Hupé 1953

Genera
- †Abadiella Hupé 1953; †Guangyuanaspis Lu and Chang 1974; †Lunolenus Lotze 1958; †Malongocephalus Zhang et al. 1980; †Shaanxia Zhang et al. 1980; †Sibiriaspis Repina 1960

Family of trilobites

Abadiellidae is a family of trilobites in the superfamily Redlichioidea. It was described in 1953 by Pierre Hupé.
