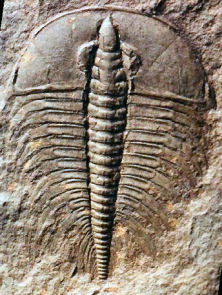
- Nevadia sp.

Scientific classification
- Kingdom: Animalia
- Phylum: Arthropoda
- Clade: †Artiopoda
- Class: †Trilobita
- Order: †Redlichiida
- Family: †Nevadiidae
- Genus: †Nevadia; Walcott, 1910

Species
- N. weeksi Walcott, 1910 (Type); N. addyensis Okulitch, 1951; N. faceta (Fritz, 1972); N. fritzi Lieberman, 2001; N. gracile (Walcott, 1910); N. ovalis McMenamin, 1987; N. parvoconica Fritz, 1992; N. saupeae Gapp, 2011

= Nevadia =

Nevadia Temporal range: Atdabanian 524–521 Ma

Extinct genus of trilobites

Nevadia is an extinct genus of redlichiid trilobites, with species of average size (about 3.5 centimetres or 1.4 inches long). It lived during the Atdabanian stage, which lasted from 530 to 524 million years ago, in what are today Western Canada, the Western United States, and Mexico.

== Etymology ==
Nevadia is named for the US State of Nevada, where the first specimens of this genus where found. N. fritzi in named in honor of W.H. Fritz, a paleontologist who worked on olenelloid trilobites.

== Description ==
The body of Nevadia is very flat dorso-ventrally. The general outline of its thin, lightly calcified exoskeleton is inverted wide drop-shaped. The front is rounded, widest at the back of the headshield (or cephalon), and tapering from there to an eventually rounded termination. The central area of the cephalon (or glabella) is distinctly tapered forward, sides slightly concave, but not wedging out in the frontal half and with a narrow rounded front. The glabella and the frontal margin do not touch (in jargon: the preglabellar field is present). Cephalic margin clearly less wide as the most frontal thoracal segment. The thorax has 27 segments. The segments look a bit degenerated behind the 15th to 18th (or an opisthothorax can be distinguished). The pleural spines are long and sickle-shaped. The tailshield (or pygidium) is very small and subquadrate in shape.

== Distribution ==
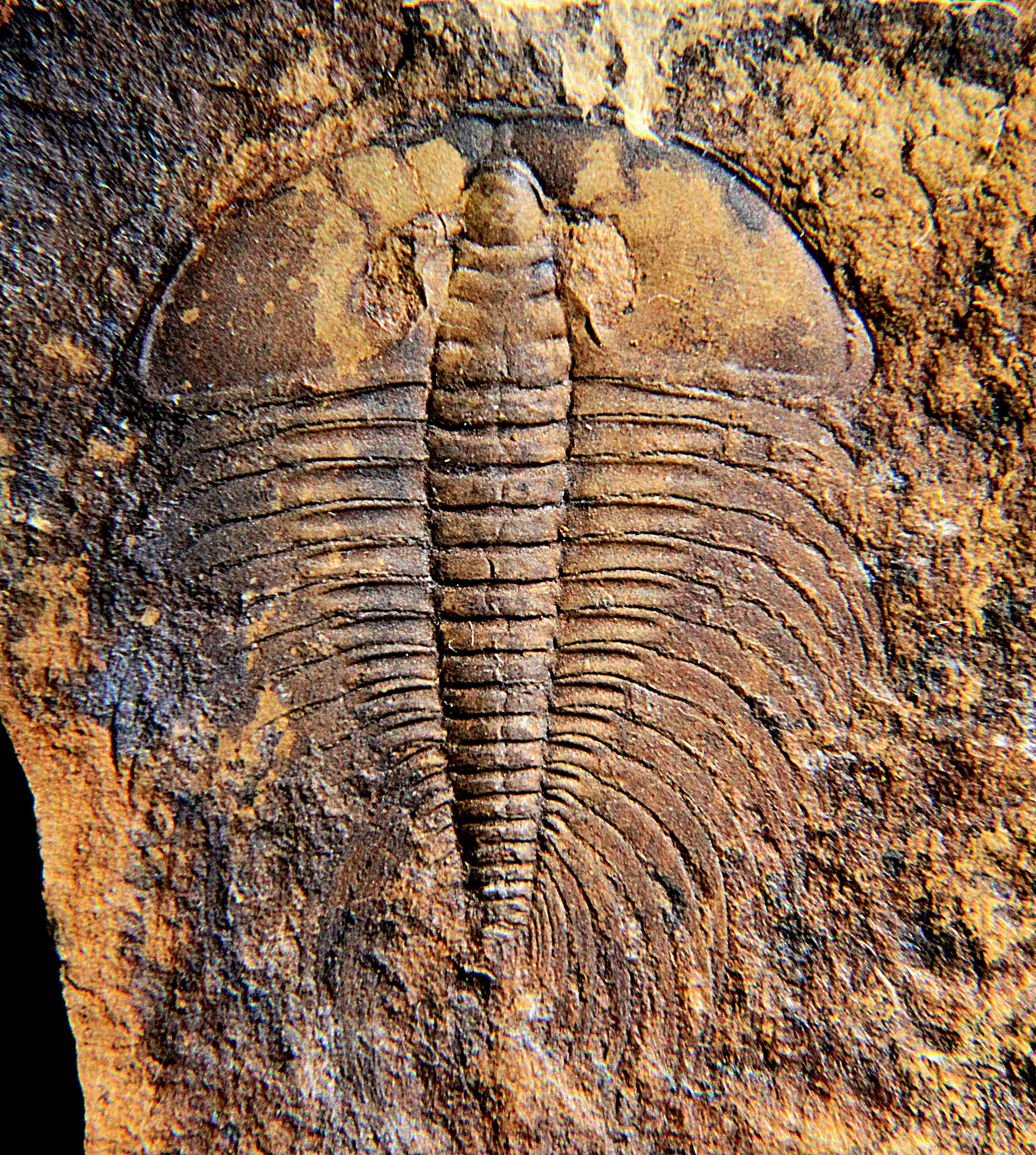
Nevadia weeksi from the Poleta Formation

- Nevadia ovalis occurs in the Lower Cambrian of the Northwest Territories, Canada (Sekwi Formation, Mackenzie Mountains), and Mexico (Senora).
- Nevadia parvoconica and Nevadia sp., have been collected at the Mural Formation, Mumm Peak Section, Canada, 53°12′N 119°6′W.
- Nevadia weeksi and Nevadia sp., were found at Cinnamon Peak-Whitehorn Mountain, Section, Mural Formation, Canada, 50°18′N 119°18′W; and at the Montenegro Member, Campito Formation, Esmeralda County, Nevada, USA.
- Nevadia weeksi occurs near the base of the Montenegro Member, Campeto Formation, Northeast of Barrel Spring, Nevada, USA, 37°30′N 117°30′W.
- Nevadia sp., was collected at Puerto Blanco, Unit 3, Cerro Rajon, Caborca Region, Mexico, 30°24′N 111°54′W; and at the Nevadella zone, Old Dominion Limestone Formation, Colville, Washington, USA, 48°30′N 117°54′W.
- Nevadia parvoconica, was found at the Middle Member of the Poleta Formation, Esmeralda County, Nevada, USA.
- Nevadia saupeae, was recovered from the Sekwi Formation, Mackenzie Mountains, Northwest Territories, Canada

== Taxonomic ==
Nevadia predates Nevadella and according to cladistic analysis includes its direct ancestor.

=== Species previously assigned to Nevadia ===
- Nevadia crosbyi = Callavia broegeri

== Habitat ==
Nevadia species were probably marine bottom dwellers, like all Olenellina.
