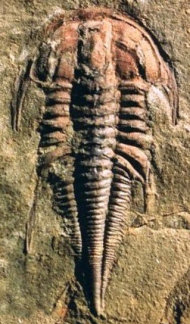
- Balcoracania dailyi of the family Emuellidae; Lower Cambrian Emu Shale; Kangaroo Island, South Australia © Dave Simpson

Scientific classification
- Kingdom: Animalia
- Phylum: Arthropoda
- Clade: †Artiopoda
- Class: †Trilobita
- Order: †Redlichiida
- Suborder: †Redlichiina
- Superfamily: †Emuelloidea; Pocock, 1970

Families
- Emuellidae; Megapharanaspidae

= Emuelloidea =

Emuelloidea Temporal range: 517 Ma late Botomian

Extinct superfamily of trilobites

Emuelloidae are a small superfamily of trilobites, a group of extinct marine arthropods, that lived during the late Lower Cambrian (late Botomian) of the East Gondwana supercontinent, in what are today South-Australia and Antarctica. Emuelloidea can be recognized by having a prothorax consisting of 3 or 6 segments, the most backward one of which is carrying very large trailing spines. Behind it is the so-called opistothorax. There are two families, the Emuellidae (with a prothorax of six segments) and the Megapharanaspididae (with a prothorax of three segments).
