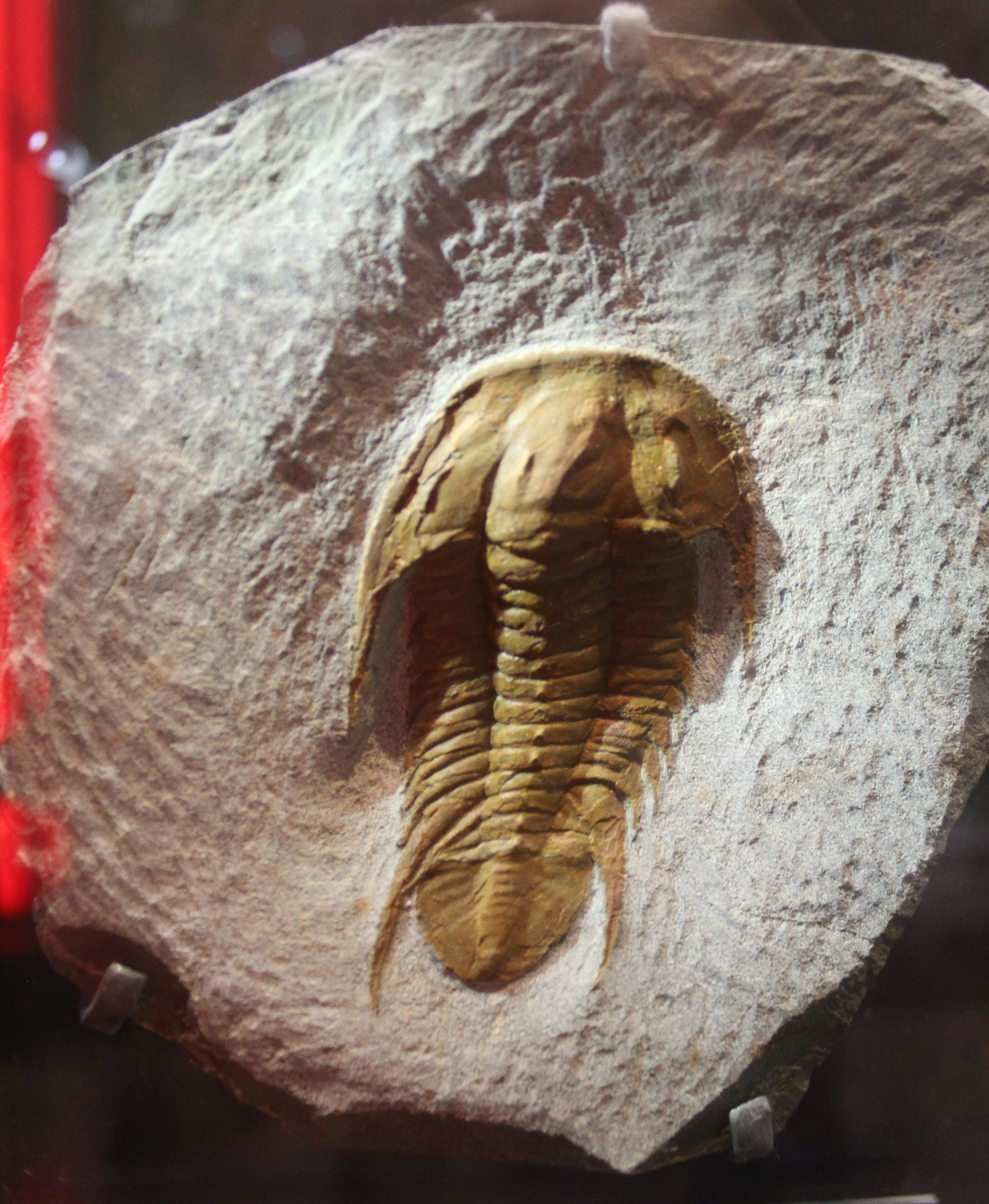
- Resserops fossil, National Museum of Natural History

Scientific classification
- Kingdom: Animalia
- Phylum: Arthropoda
- Clade: †Artiopoda
- Class: †Trilobita
- Order: †Redlichiida
- Family: †Saukiandidae
- Genus: †Resserops; Richter & Richter, 1940

= Resserops =

Resserops Temporal range: Atdabanian/Botomian

Resserops is an extinct genus from a well-known class of fossil marine arthropods, the trilobites. It lived during the middle of the Atdabanian or the early part of the Botomian stage, which lasted from approximately 524 to 518.5 million years ago. This faunal stage was part of the Cambrian Period. It has been found in Spain and southern Morocco. It can be recognised by the sabre-like spines of the headshield that are a smooth continuation of the frontal edge, and the enlarged spines on the 9th segment of the thorax.

== Distribution ==
Lower Cambrian of Spain and Southern Morocco (Daguinaspis and Resserops-zone near Amouslek, Ouijane and Tiout).

== Taxonomy ==
The Treatise considers Resserops and Richterops subgenera of Perrector, which name was proposed by Hupé in the same publication as Resserops and Richterops, but appears above it and thus has preference. Later publications use Resserops and Richterops however as separate genera.

== Description ==
As with most early trilobites, Resserops has an almost flat exoskeleton, that is only thinly calcified, and has crescent-shaped eye ridges. As a representative of the Redlichiina suborder, the headshield (or cephalon) has sutures where the exoskeleton ruptures to assist in moulting. The cephalon is approximately ovate, more than twice as wide as long. There is no space between the raised axis (or glabella) and the raised ridge (or anterior border) that defines the contour of the cephalon (in jargon: the preglabellar field is absent). The eye ridges are large, extend outward and arch backward near their tips. The cephalon carries massive sabre-like relatively short spines (or genal spines) that are a smooth continuation of the anterior border. The genal spines are connected at about half of the length of the cephalon (or are well-advanced). The tips of the genal spines are approximately as far out as their base. The thorax has 12 segments, the 9th segment (counted from the front) carries large spines at its tips, longer than the genal spines and longer than the thorax axis, extending about one pygidial length behind the body. The tailshield (or pygidium) has a smooth border, is large for a redlichiida, (about 60% of the length of the cephalon), both the axis and pleural regions of the pygidium have about 6 recognisable segments.
