= Profallotaspis =

Profallotaspis Temporal range: Early Atdabanian

Scientific classification
- Kingdom: Animalia
- Phylum: Arthropoda
- Clade: †Artiopoda
- Class: †Trilobita
- Order: †Redlichiida
- Family: †Archaeaspididae
- Genus: †Profallotaspis; Repina, 1965

Genus of trilobites

Profallotaspis is an extinct genus of trilobites. It lived during the early Atdabanian stage, some 520 million years ago. Profallotaspis jakutensis is arguably the earliest trilobite ever found. Representatives of Profallotaspis have been recorded in the provisional Cambrian Stage 3 deposits of Siberia and, possibly North America.
