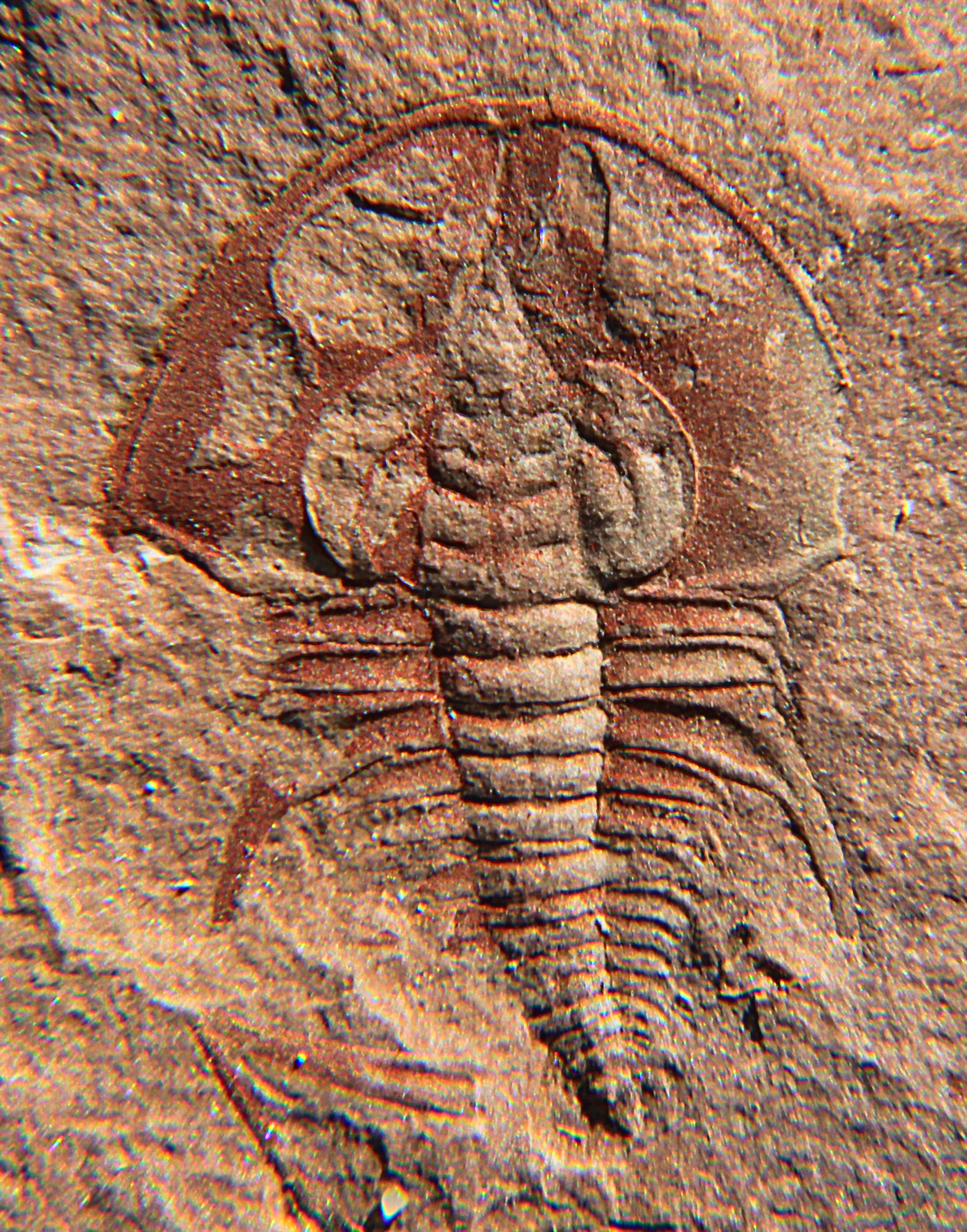
- Olenellus chiefensis

Scientific classification
- Kingdom: Animalia
- Phylum: Arthropoda
- Clade: †Artiopoda
- Class: †Trilobita
- Order: †Redlichiida
- Suborder: †Olenellina

Superfamilies
- Superfamily Olenelloidea; Biceratopsidae; Holmiidae; Olenellidae; Stemgroup genera: Elliptocephala, Fritzolenellus, Laudonia, Mummaspis, Wanneria: Superfamily Judomioidea; Judomiidae; Stemgroup genera: Callavalonia, Callavia, Sdzuyomia: Superfamily Nevadioidea; Superfamily Fallotaspidoidea; Archaeaspididae; Daguinaspididae; Fallotaspididae; Stemgroup genera: Fallotaspidella, Parafallotaspis, Repinaella

= Olenellina =

Olenellina Temporal range: Cambrian - Series 2

Extinct suborder of trilobites

Olenellina is a suborder of the order Redlichiida of trilobites that occurs about halfway during the Lower Cambrian, at the start of the stage called the Atdabanian. Olenellina are arguably the earliest trilobites in the fossil record as members of Redlichiina, although Ptychopariida and Eodiscina follow soon after. The suborder died out when the Lower Cambrian passed into the Middle Cambrian, at the end of the stage called Toyonian. A feature uniting the Olenellina is the lack of rupture lines (or sutures) in the headshield, which in other trilobites assist the periodic moulting (or ecdysis), associated with arthropod growth. Some derived trilobites have lost facial sutures again (some Eodiscina, all Agnostina, and a few Phacopina), but all of these are blind, while all Olenellina have eyes.

== Taxonomy ==
The suborder contains four superfamilies: Olenelloidea (with 3 families and 5 stemgroup genera), Judomioidea (with 1 family and 3 stemgroup genera), Nevadioidea, and Fallotaspidoidea (with 3 families and 3 stemgroup genera). Lieberman, 2002, considered that the Fallotaspidoidea are a paraphyletic group because it gave rise to the Redlichiina; he did not propose to restrict the Olenellina to the Olenelloidea, Judomioidea and Nevadioidea. Neither did he propose to assign this group of superfamilies to a newly formed order Olenellida, and consequently expand the Redlichiina to include the Fallotaspidoidea. This would imply that the Redlichiina would include taxa with and without dorsal sutures.

== Distribution ==
The Olenellina appear suddenly at the start of the Cambrian Series 2 (between Stage 2 Tommotian and Stage 3 Atdabanian) approximately 521 million years ago, and disappear at the end of this Series (between Stage 4 Toyonian and Stage 5 Amgan), 514.5 to 506.5 million years ago. The Olenellina probably first occurred on the paleocontinent Siberia and spread into the part of Gondwana that is now the Atlas Mountains, Baltica, Avalonia and Laurentia. In western Laurentia the first representatives to appear are Fallotaspididae, followed by Archaeaspididae, Nevadioidea and Holmiidae, and finally Biceratopsidae and Olenellidae. Significant deposits are found in Lantham Shale deposits within the Marble Mountains of southern California. The Olenellina are not known from South China, Australia and most of Latin America and Africa, where the first trilobites were Redlichiina, that had already developed dorsal sutures.

== Description ==
As with most early trilobites, the Olenellina have an almost flat exoskeleton, that is only thinly calcified, and have crescent-shaped eye ridges. The suborder differs from all other trilobites by the lack of dorsal sutures in the head shield (or cephalon). There is a ventral mouth plate (or conterminant hypostome) with a very wide rostral plate extending between genal angles, with a perrostral suture (no connective sutures).

The thorax may be composed of a prothorax that generally has 14 or 15 segments, and an opisthothorax that has between 0 and up to 34 segments. In segment 3, the areas right and left of the axis (or pleural lobes) are often enlarged, sometimes carrying large trailing pleural spines. Segment 14 or 15 is often bearing a large spine at midline that points backwards.

The pygidium is mostly very small with few segments, that are often difficult to discern.

Unlike in other trilobite groups, the early larval stage called protaspid is not known, and it is generally accepted that this is because the protaspid was not calcified.

== Key to the superfamilies ==
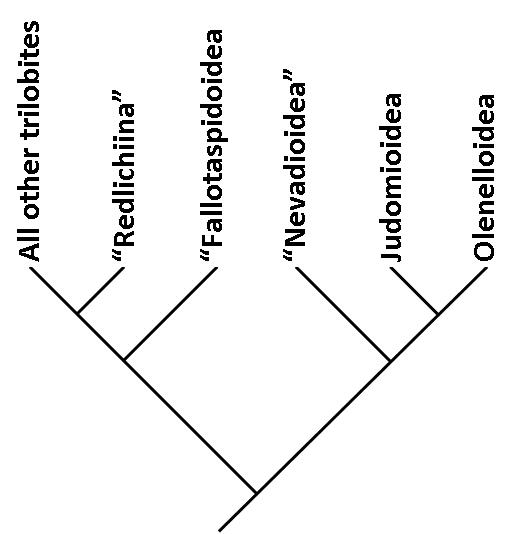
Graphic of the relationship between the superfamilies within the Olenellina, and with other trilobites

1	The frontal lobe of the glabella (L4) is longer than, or equal to, the length of the most backward lobe of the glabella (called occipital ring or L0) plus the first pair of side lobes counted from the back (L1), measured along the midline.→ 2
-	L4 approximately equal in length to L0. → “Fallotaspidoidea”
2	The eye ridge (or ocular lobe) merges with the frontal lobe of the glabella. → 3
-	The ocular lobe touches, but not merges with L4. → Stemgroup “Nevadioidea“
3	The ocular lobe merges with the entire margin of L4. → Crowngroup “Nevadioidea“ and Judomioidea
-	The ocular lobe merges with the posterior margin of L4 only. → Olenelloidea
