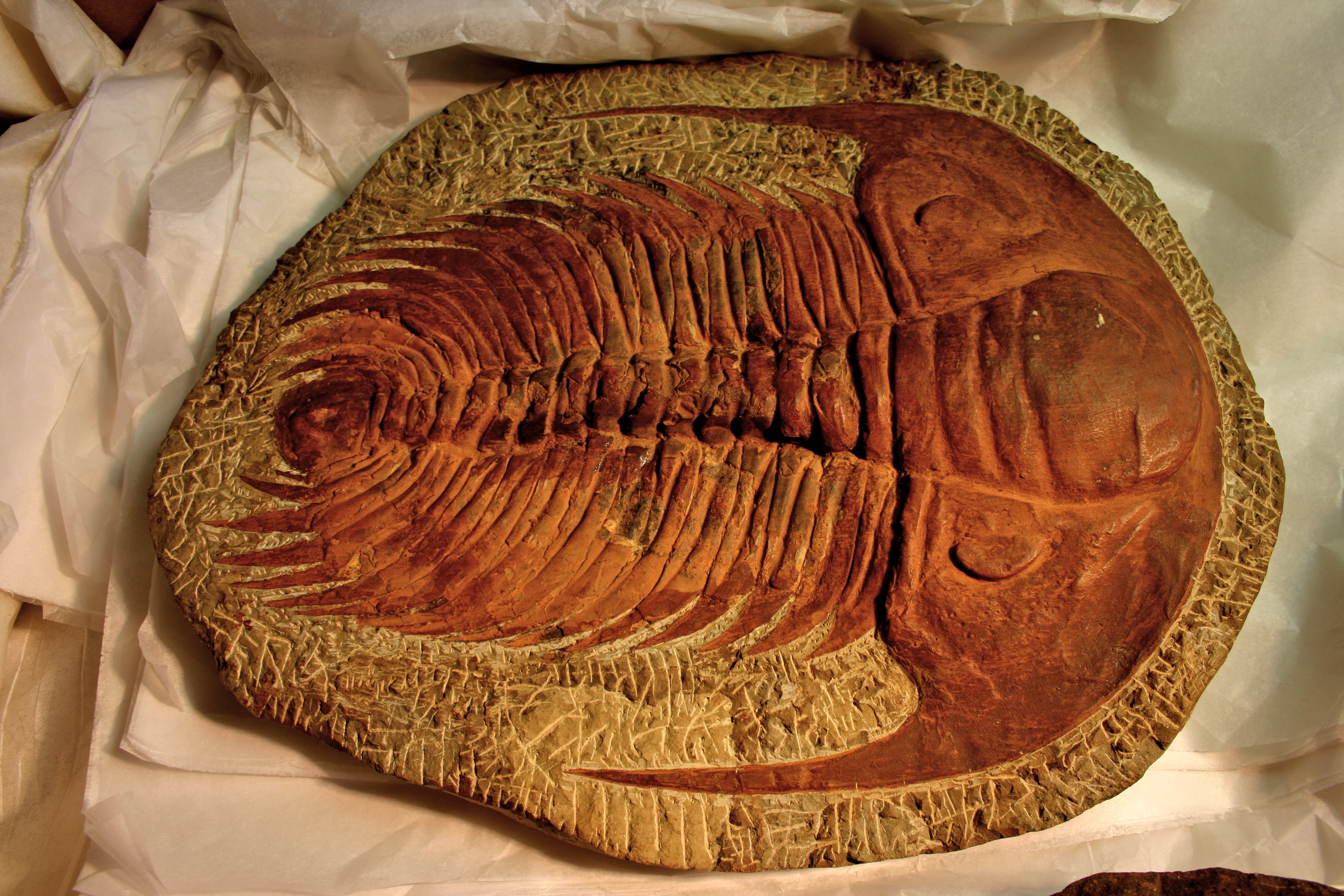
- Paradoxides

Scientific classification
- Kingdom: Animalia
- Phylum: Arthropoda
- Clade: †Artiopoda
- Class: †Trilobita
- Order: †Redlichiida
- Suborder: †Redlichiina
- Superfamily: †Paradoxidoidea; Hawle & Corda, 1847

Families
- Paradoxididae; Centropleuridae; Xystriduridae

= Paradoxidoidea =

Paradoxidoidea Temporal range: upper Lower Cambrian–Middle Cambrian

Extinct superfamily of trilobites

The Paradoxidoidea Hawle & Corda 1847, are a superfamily of trilobites, a group of extinct marine arthropods. They occurred during the late Lower Cambrian (Toyonian) and disappeared at the end of the Middle Cambrian.

== Description ==
Species in this superfamily can be average (under 10 cm) to very large (over 30 cm), are relatively flat, have an inverted egg-shaped outline, a glabella that in early genera has parallel sides and expands forward in later representatives, and approaches or reaches the frontal border. All species have an almost semicircular headshield (or cephalon) with long backward directed genal spines. The facial suture in front of the eye diverges forward and outward in the Paradoxididae, while in the Centropleuridae it runs outward and even a bit backward (or retrodivergent). The articulate middle part of the body (or thorax) consists of 14 to 21 segments ending in sickle-shaped spines that to the back curve increasingly further backwards (Paradoxididae) or in bluntly truncated tips (Centropleuridae). While in the Paradoxididae the frontal two segments may be more robust, the thorax of the Centropleuridae is characterize by longer backward directed sickle shaped spines on the three rear thoracic segments. The tailshield (or pygidium) is typically small with an entire margin or pair of spines in Paradoxididae, and medium-sized with 2 or 3 pairs of marginal spines in the Centropleuridae.

== Key to the families ==
1	Thorax with 15-21 segments tipped with sickle-shaped spines, frontal two may be enlarged. Pygidium small with an entire margin. → Paradoxididae
-	Thorax with 14-16 segments with rounded or truncated tips, except for the three next to the pygidium which are tipped with sickle-shaped spines. Pygidium medium-sized with two or three pairs of marginal spines. → Centropleuridae
