= Repinaella =

Repinaella Temporal range: Lower Cambrian (Atdabanian)

Scientific classification
- Kingdom: Animalia
- Phylum: Arthropoda
- Clade: †Artiopoda
- Class: †Trilobita
- Order: †Redlichiida
- Superfamily: †Fallotaspidoidea
- Genus: †Repinaella; Geyer, 1996

Species
- R. siberica (Repina in Khomentovskii and Repina, 1965) (Type)

Synonyms
- Fallotaspis siberica Repinella siberica

Genus of anthropods

Repinaella is an extinct genus from a well-known class of fossil marine arthropods, the trilobites. It lived during the late Atdabanian stage.

== Distribution ==
- Repinaella siberica has been found in the Lower Cambrian of Siberia (Pestrotsvet Formation, Lena River).
- cf. Repinaella sp., the first trilobite to appear in Laurentia, has been reported from the Lower Cambrian of Nevada (Northern Clayton Ridge; Andrew Mountain Member of the Montezuma Range, Campito Formation). The occurrence of cf. Repinaella is approximately correlative with the earliest trilobites in Siberia and western Gondwana.

== Taxonomy ==
Within the "Fallotaspidoidea" superfamily Repinaella siberia is closest to the common ancestor with the other Olenellina, particularly Pseudojudomia egregia, and the common characters of these two species were probably shared with the common ancestor of all trilobites.
