= Bradyfallotaspis =

Bradyfallotaspis Temporal range: Late Atdabanian(Fallotaspis-zone)

Scientific classification
- Kingdom: Animalia
- Phylum: Arthropoda
- Clade: †Artiopoda
- Class: †Trilobita
- Order: †Redlichiida
- Family: †Archaeaspididae
- Genus: †Bradyfallotaspis; Fritz, 1972

Species
- B. fusa Fritz, 1972 (Type); B. coriae Gapp, 2010; B. nicolascagei Gapp, 2010; B. sekwiensis Gapp, 2010

Bradyfallotaspis is an extinct genus from a well-known class of fossil marine arthropods, the trilobites. It lived during the late Atdabanian stage, during the early part of the Cambrian Period.
