= Megapharanaspis =

Megapharanaspis Temporal range: 517 Ma late Botomian

Scientific classification
- Kingdom: Animalia
- Phylum: Arthropoda
- Clade: †Artiopoda
- Class: †Trilobita
- Order: †Redlichiida
- Suborder: †Redlichiina
- Superfamily: †Emuelloidea
- Family: †Megapharanaspidae; Paterson & Jago, 2006
- Genus: †Megapharanaspis; Paterson & Jago, 2006
- Species: †M. nedini

Binomial name
- †Megapharanaspis nedini Paterson & Jago, 2006

Megapharanaspis nedini is a small (maximally 1.3 centimetres (0.51 in)) trilobite of the superfamily Emuelloidea, within which it occupies a family on its own. Its fossils have been found in the Lower Cambrian of South-Australia.

== Etymology ==
The genus name composed of the Greek μέγας (mega), meaning great, pharangos, meaning gully, and ἀσπίς (aspis) shield, referencing Big Gully on Kangaroo Island, the only known site where fossils of Megapharanaspis were collected. The species epithet nedini is in honor of Dr. Chris Nedin.
