= Yunnanaspis =

Yunnanaspis Temporal range: Late Botomian

Scientific classification
- Kingdom: Animalia
- Phylum: Arthropoda
- Clade: †Artiopoda
- Class: †Trilobita
- Order: †Redlichiida
- Family: †Yinitidae
- Genus: †Yunnanaspis; Chang, 1966

Genus of trilobite

Yunnanaspis is an extinct genus of redlichiid trilobite of what is now China. It lived during the later part of the Botomian stage, which lasted from approximately 524 to 518.5 million years ago. This faunal stage was part of the Cambrian Period.
