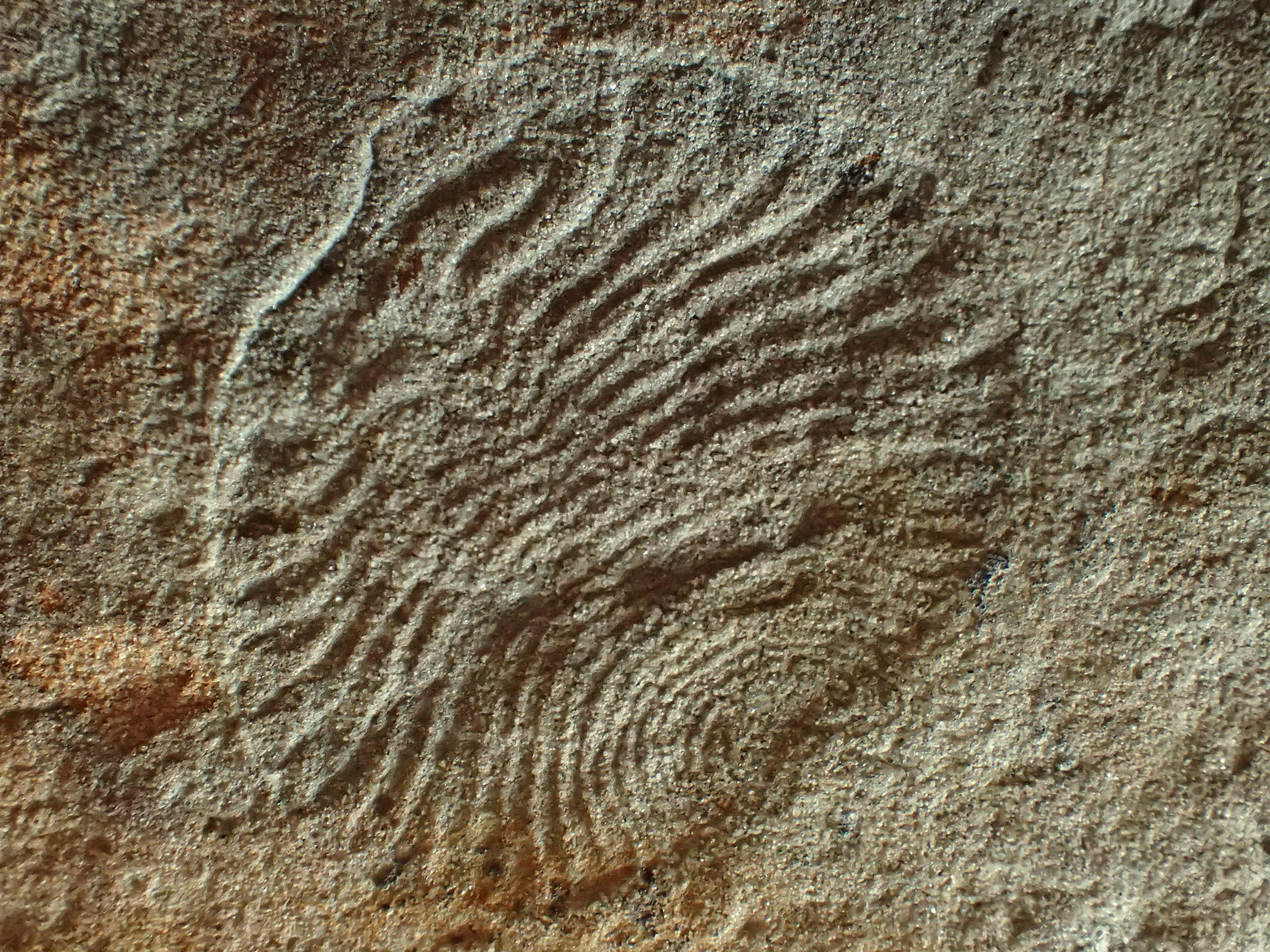
- Archaeaspinus fedonkini

Scientific classification
- Kingdom: Animalia
- Phylum: †Proarticulata
- Class: †Cephalozoa
- Family: †Yorgiidae
- Genus: †Archaeaspinus; Ivantsov, 2007
- Species: †A. fedonkini

Binomial name
- †Archaeaspinus fedonkini (Ivantsov, 2001)

Synonyms
- Archaeaspis Ivantsov, 2001

= Archaeaspinus =

Archaeaspinus Temporal range: Ediacaran, 557–552 Ma

Extinct species of animal

Archaeaspinus fedonkini is an extinct proarticulate from the Late Ediacaran period.

== Background ==
Archaeaspinus was discovered in Zimnii Bereg, the Winter Coast of the White Sea in Russia, by A. Yu. Ivantsov in 2001. Since then, numerous additional fossils have been attributed to the genus, mostly from that same type locality, but a small number from Flinders Ranges in South Australia as well.

Originally called Archaeaspis—a name already applied to a redlichiid trilobite—in 2001 by Ivantsov, it was later recombined under its current name in 2007 by the same author. The type species, A. fedonkini, is the only species known in this genus. It appears in the fossil record between 557-552 Ma.

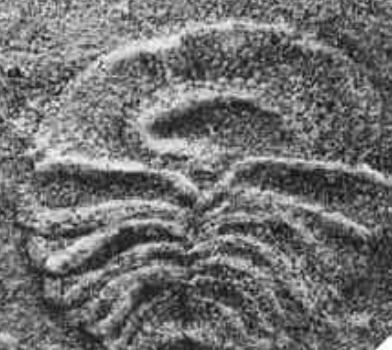
A. fedonkini, Ivantsov 2007

== Description ==
As with other genera within the family Yorgiidae, Archaeaspinus is discoid. Much of its body segmented by up to 15 bilateral isomers. It has an unsegmented anterior end reminiscent of a head, full of what may be distribution channels. It also contains what appears to be an unpaired lobe which branches off the isomer that is furthest forward to loop within the "head" section, following the shape of the body. This lobe, or perhaps irregular isomer, is bordered by a shallow furrow on the anterior and left edge.

The isomers are arranged in a gliding reflection symmetry, thought to have increased in size and quantity as the organism aged and grew. The dorsal side is covered with evenly spaced tubercles.

Though originally thought to have been soft bodied, it has also been suggested that Archaeaspinus had a delicate, flexible carapace ("cover tissue") covering its dorsal side.

It closely resembles Yorgia, because of the similar anterior region, and to a lesser extent Dickinsonia and other proarticulates.

== Phylogenetic relationships ==
Archaeaspinus belongs to the phylum Proarticulata. Within that, its class is Cephalozoa and family Yorgiidae. Until 2004 Cephalozoans were categorized within the class Vendiamorpha, so older records of the Archaeaspinus may label it a vendiamorph.

Newer analyses suggest that tissue on the ventral side of most proarticulates, and therefore Archaeaspinus, bore cilia for feeding.

== Paleoecology ==
Archaeaspinus is thought to have used an osmotrophic or filter-feeding strategy, absorbing nutrients from the microbial mat below in much the same way that Yorgia did.
