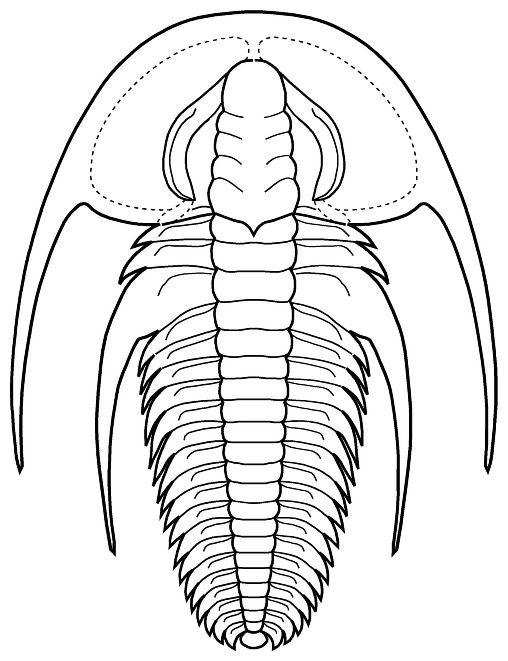
- Fallotaspis longa, White Mountain, courtesy Sam Gon III

Scientific classification
- Kingdom: Animalia
- Phylum: Arthropoda
- Clade: †Artiopoda
- Class: †Trilobita
- Order: †Redlichiida
- Family: †Fallotaspididae
- Genus: †Fallotaspis; Hupé, 1953

Species
- F. typica Hupé, 1953 (Type); F. antecedens Geyer, 2019; F. bondoni (Neltner & Poctey, 1949), synonym Olenellus bondoni; F. inexspectatus Geyer, 1996; F. ljugneri (Kautsky, 1945); F. longa Hupé, 1953; F. longispina Hupé, 1953; F. mongolicus Korobov, 1980; F. plana Hupé, 1953; F. planospinosa Hupé, 1953; F. tazemmourtensis Hupé, 1953

= Fallotaspis =

Fallotaspis Temporal range: Lower Cambrian (Lower Atdabanian)

Cambrian Period genus of trilobites

Fallotaspis is a genus of redlichiid trilobites found in Early Cambrian-aged strata of the United States and Morocco.

== Etymology ==
The generic name, Fallotaspis, is a compound crassis word that honors Paul Fallot (1889-1960), a French paleontologist who researched Cambrian fossils in Spain, in combination with the Greek word ἀσπίς, aspis, meaning shield.

== Description ==
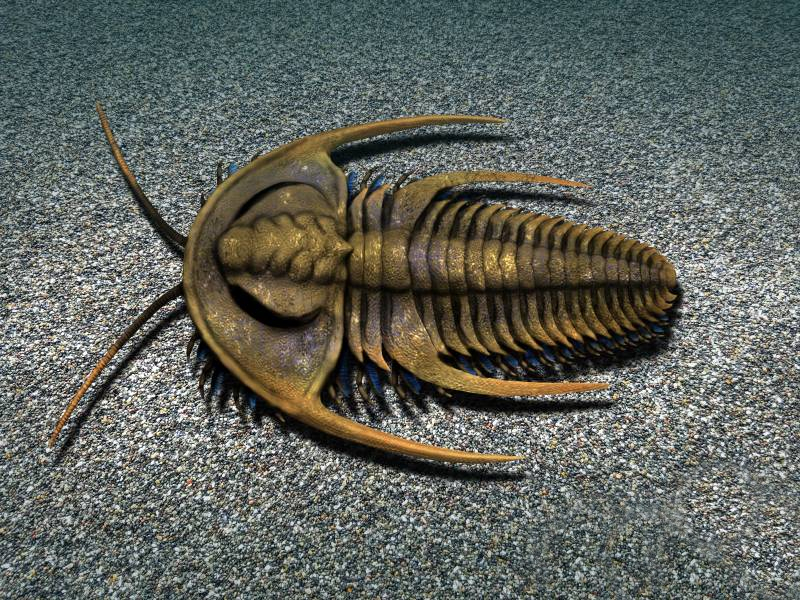
Restoration of F. bondoni

As with most early trilobites, Fallotaspis has an almost flat exoskeleton, that is only thinly calcified, and has crescent-shaped eye ridges. As part of the Olenellina suborder, Fallotaspis lacks dorsal sutures. As part of the superfamily Fallotaspidoidea Fallotaspis can be distinguished from Olenelloidea, Judomioidea and Nevadioidea by features of the cephalon and in particular the glabella. The glabella tapers forward. The frontal lobe of the glabella (because it is counted from the back, it is numbered L4) is as long as the most backward lobe (L0), less than in these other Olenellina subfamilies. The eye ridges (or ocular lobes) contact, but do not merge with, the entire frontal margin of the glabella. The cephalon of Fallotaspis is semi-circular in shape, with rounded cheeks that are continuous with long spines that go back to the first half of the thorax. Sutures absent. The thorax has up to 21 segments. The third segment terminating in a long spine that extends back to the fourteenth segment. The tail shield (or pygidium) is very small, about the same length as the two most backward thorax segments combined.

== Key to the species ==
This key is based on the analysis of Lieberman. This key only includes the two Fallotaspis species that Lieberman included in his analysis, where the literature suggests there may be at least ten species. It complements the key in the Fallotaspidoidea article.

1	The ridge bordering the head shield (or anterior border) in front of the sides of the glabella is approximately 1½× as wide as the most backward lobe of the glabella (occipital ring or L0). → Fallotaspis typica
-	The anterior border is at most 1¼× as wide as L0. → Fallotaspis bondoni

== Sources ==
- Photo of F. longa
- Photo of F. sp.
- White Mtn research station
