= Paul Fallot =

French scientist (1889–1960)

Paul Fallot (25 June 1889 in Strasbourg – 21 October 1960 in Paris) was a French geologist and paleontologist. Throughout his career the Mediterranean region, and especially Spain, was the focus of his work.

Fallot began his studies in 1908 at the University of Lausanne, under the well known geologist Maurice Lugeon. In 1909 he moved to Grenoble to work at the laboratory of geologist and paleontologist Wilfred Kilian on ammonites of the Balearic Islands. In 1910-1911 he broadens his knowledge of general geology and stratigraphy at the Sorbonne led with Emile Haug.

From 1914 to 1916 he serves in the French army, which earned him the Croix de Guerre, with five honorable mentions, and the Ordre national de la Légion d'honneur Cross.

After the war, Fallot was employed by his former teacher Kilian in Grenoble and continued his work in Mallorca. His "Geological Etude de la Sierra de Majorque" appears in 1922. The next year Paul Fallot was appointed director of the Institute of Applied Geology in Nancy, a position he keeps the next 14 years. With staff and students he worked in the Jura, but his main work he performed in the Betic ranges of southern Spain and the Rif Mountains of North Africa. In 1931 the Academy of Sciences grants Fallot the Grand Prix des Sciences physiques.

His appointment in 1937 as professor of Geology of the Mediterranean at the Collège de France, seemed the opportunity to scale up his work on the tectonics of the entire area with a team of specialists, but the outbreak of World War II hindered this. During the war he stayed in Paris, prepared publications of the Geological Service of Morocco, proposes a comprehensive document together on the geology of subbetische chains and analyzes the layers of the Triassic of Algeria.

In 1948 Paul Fallot was appointed as member of the Académie des Sciences. Fallot was also one of the foreign members of the Royal Netherlands Academy of Arts and Sciences since May 1960. The Lower Cambrian trilobite genus Fallotaspis was named in his honour.
