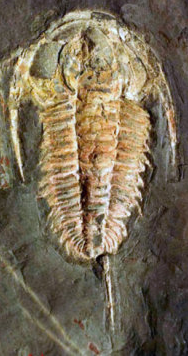
- Redlichia takooensis , a member of the trilobite suborder Redlichiina. Lower Cambrian Emu Shale; Kangaroo Island, South Australia

Scientific classification
- Kingdom: Animalia
- Phylum: Arthropoda
- Clade: †Artiopoda
- Class: †Trilobita
- Order: †Redlichiida
- Suborder: †Redlichiina; Richter, 1932

Superfamilies
- Superfamily Emuelloidea; Emuellidae; Megapharanaspidae; Superfamily Paradoxidoidea; Centropleuridae; Paradoxididae; Xystriduridae; Superfamily Redlichioidea; Abadiellidae; Chengkouaspidae; Dolerolenidae; Gigantopygidae; Kuechowiidae; Mayiellidae; Menneraspididae; Metadoxididae; Redlichiidae; Redlichinidae; Saukiandidae; Yinitidae

= Redlichiina =

Redlichiina Temporal range: late Lower - Middle Cambrian

Extinct suborder of trilobites

Redlichiina is a suborder of the order Redlichiida of trilobites. The suborder contains three superfamilies: Emuelloidea, Redlichioidea and Paradoxidoidea. These trilobites are some of the oldest trilobites known. They originated at the beginning of the Cambrian Period and disappeared (possibly by evolving into members of the Ptychopariida order) at the end of the middle Cambrian.

== Physiology ==
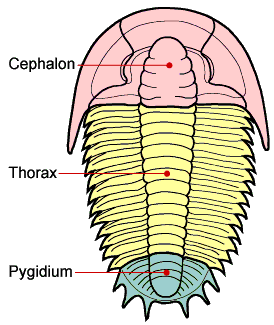
Diagram showing the cephalon, thorax and pygidium of an example trilobite.

Cephalon: Opisthoparian facial sutures. Early forms tend to have tapering, conical glabella with furrows extending far backwards while later forms with glabella expanding forwards to inflated frontal lobe. The hypostome is conterminant (e.g., Redlichia) or natant (e.g., Dolerolenus). The rostral plate is narrower than in suborder Olenellina, bound by rostral and connective sutures.

Thorax: Fulcrate or non-fulcrate, typically with many segments (60+ in an Emmuelid). The axis is infrequently spine-bearing.

Pygidium: Typically small, but can be larger and with many segments.
