= Microschedia =

Microschedia Temporal range: Lower Cambrian
- Microschedia (Image source: Geyer 1994)

Scientific classification
- Kingdom: Animalia
- Clade: Bilateria
- Phylum: incertae sedis
- Genus: †Microschedia; Geyer, 1994
- Species: †M. amphitrite

Binomial name
- †Microschedia amphitrite Geyer, 1994

Extinct genus of enigmatic organisms

Microschedia is an enigmatic fossil bilaterian known from four specimens from Lower Cambrian Amouslek Formation deposits in Morocco.

== Morphology ==
The fossils are approximately discoid, and covered with a net-like pattern. Fine hair-like projections extend beyond the edge of this almost-flat, firm (but non-mineralized) "shell", which bears no trace of muscle scars.

== Affinity ==
Although there are problems with both brachiopod and cnidarian interpretations, no other animal group provides a good match for these fossils. An affinity with the stem-group brachiopod Mickwitzia is currently considered to be the most likely interpretation for this fossil.

The enigmatic Cambrian and Ordovician animals Heliomedusa, Marocella and Conchopeltis warrant comparison, although again large differences exist between these taxa.
