= Judomioidea =

Judomioidea Temporal range: Lower Cambrian (Atdabanian)

Scientific classification
- Kingdom: Animalia
- Phylum: Arthropoda
- Clade: †Artiopoda
- Class: †Trilobita
- Order: †Redlichiida
- Suborder: †Olenellina
- Superfamily: †Judomioidea; Palmer & Repina, 1993

Families
- Judomiidae; Judomiinae; Neltneriinae; stem group genera: Callavalonia; Callavia; Sdzuyomia

Superfamily of trilobites

The Judomioidea are a superfamily of trilobites, a group of extinct marine arthropods. Its species lived during the Lower Cambrian (Atdabanian).
