= Lemdadella =

Lemdadella Temporal range: Late Atdabanian

Scientific classification
- Kingdom: Animalia
- Phylum: Arthropoda
- Clade: †Artiopoda
- Class: †Trilobita
- Order: †Redlichiida
- Family: †Redlichiidae
- Subfamily: †Pararedlichiinae
- Genus: †Lemdadella; Sdzuy, 1978

Species
- L. spectabilis Sdzuy, 1978 (Type); L. antarcticae Palmer in Palmer and Rowell, 1995; L. linaresae Liñán Guijarro, 1978; L. perejoni Liñán c.s., 2005

Genus of trilobites

Lemdadella is an extinct genus of redlichiid trilobites that lived during the late Atdabanian stage, which lasted from 521 to 514 million years ago during the early part of the Cambrian Period.

== Distribution ==
- Lemdadella sp. occurs in the Lower Cambrian of Morocco (Botomian, Ounein A bioherm, Lemdad 1 section, High Atlas)
- Lemdadella linaresae was collected in the Lower Cambrian of Spain (Atdabanian, Pedroche Formation, Member 1, Puente de Hierro Section)
- Lemdadella sp. was found in the Lower Cambrian of Antarctica (Toyonian, Shackleton Limestone; BC-BD collections)
- Lemdadella antarcticae occurs in the Lower Cambrian of Antarctica (Atdabanian, Shackleton Limestone; BC-BD collections)

== Description ==
Glabella gently tapered forward. At the midline, a ridge between the glabella and the border of the cephalon (a so-called plectrum) may be present. Crescent-shaped eye-ridges. Thorax not divided in prothorax and opisthothorax, no macropleural segment.

== Biostratigraphy ==
Lemdadella is currently the oldest trilobite genus known, dating back to about 521 million years ago. The International Commission on Stratigraphy has proposed that the first appearance datum of trilobites should be used as the lower boundary of Cambrian Series 2 and Cambrian Stage 3. If this proposal will be defined as a GSSP, it will most likely use the first appearance of Lemdadella, a species of Lemdadella, or a trilobite zone that includes Lemdadella. The age and global distribution of Lemdadella are therefore of key importance for the Stratigraphy of the Cambrian.

The following trilobite zones contain Lemdadella (Brackets contain geographic distribution):

- Fallotaspis zone (Spain, Laurentia)
- Eoredlichia-Yunnanocephalus zone (Antarctica)
