= Pierre Hupé =

French paleontologist (1907–2003)

Pierre Hupé (22 March 1907, Baye – 23 August 2003, Paris) was a French paleontologist.

Hupé studied sciences at the Universities of Strasbourg and Nancy, where he graduated in 1931 with the geneticist Lucien Cuénot. Hupé was an excellent draftsman, for which he also won prizes at the University. After that he was high school teacher of natural sciences. In the 1930s he made the first geological inventory of the Pyrenees on an assignment by Professor Charles Jacob. During World War II he was an artillery officer and received the Croix de Guerre. Between 1945 and 1949 he worked for the CNRS and in 1951 at started at the Laboratory of Geology of the Sorbonne. In 1960 he was appointed professor of paleontology at the Sorbonne (later the University of Paris VI, Pierre et Marie Curie), where he founded the Laboratory of Invertebrate Paleontology in 1967, which he directed until his retirement in 1977.

Hupé is known for his classical works on trilobites, especially their classification. This work later formed the basis for the classification in the Treatise on Invertebrate Paleontology. He is also known for his work on the trilobites of the Lower Cambrian of Morocco, and his detailed stratigraphy, commissioned by the Service Geologique du Maroc in 1952. He gained international recognition with his monograph of the Lower and Middle Cambrian and Ordovician in southern Morocco, and received in 1957 the Charles Doolittle Walcott Medal. In 1959 he received his doctorate with a thesis titled Nouvelle contribution à l'étude du Cambrien Marocain. He left his trilobites collection to the University of Rennes I, and to the Natural History Museum in Havre.

== Main publications ==
- Classe des Trilobites, in J. Piveteau Traité de Paléontologie, Band 3, Masson 1953, S. 44-246
- Classification des Trilobites, Annales de Paléontologie, 1953, 1955
- Contribution à l'étude du Cambrien inférieur et du Précambrien III de l´Antiatlas marocain, Notes et Mémoires, Service des Mines et de la Carte géologique du Maroc, Band 103, 1953, pp. 1–402

== Sources ==
- biography in Palass Newsletter pdf
- Obituary of Francoise Bigey, the Paleontological Society Newsletter (Priscum), Volume 12, No.2, Winter 2004
