= Cambrian Stage 3 =

Unnamed third stage of the Cambrian

- ~521 – ~514.5 Ma

Chronology
← / Orsten Fauna; ← / Dresbachian extinction; ← / Burgess Shale; ← / Kaili biota; ← / Archaeocyatha extinction; ← / Emu Bay Shale; ← / Sirius Passet biota; ← / Chengjiang biota; ← / First Trilobites; ← / SSF diversification, first brachiopods & archaeocyatha; ← / First halkieriids, mollusсs, hyoliths SSF; ← / Baykonurian glaciation
Major glacial period
Subdivision of the Cambrian according to the ICS, as of 2024. Vertical axis scale: Millions of years ago

Etymology
- Name formality: Informal

Usage information
- Celestial body: Earth
- Regional usage: Global (ICS)
- Time scale(s) used: ICS Time Scale

Definition
- Chronological unit: Age
- Stratigraphic unit: Stage
- Time span formality: Formal
- Lower boundary definition: Not formally defined
- Lower boundary definition candidates: FAD of Trilobites
- Lower boundary GSSP candidate section(s): None
- Lower GSSP ratified: Not formally defined
- Upper boundary definition: Not formally defined
- Upper boundary definition candidates: FAD of the Trilobites Olenellus or Redlichia
- Upper boundary GSSP candidate section(s): None
- Upper GSSP ratified: Not formally defined

Cambrian Stage 3 is the still unnamed third stage of the Cambrian. It succeeds Cambrian Stage 2 and precedes Cambrian Stage 4, although neither its base nor top have been formally defined. The plan is for its lower boundary to correspond approximately to the first appearance of trilobites, about 521 million years ago, though the globally asynchronous appearance of trilobites warrants the use of a separate, globally synchronous marker to define the base. The upper boundary and beginning of Cambrian Stage 4 is informally defined as the first appearance of the trilobite genera Olenellus or Redlichia around 514.5 million years ago.

The lack of name does not indicate a lack of importance; for example, this stage contains both the Chengjiang biota and the Sirius Passet biota.

== Naming ==
The International Commission on Stratigraphy has not officially named the third stage of the Cambrian. The stage approximately corresponds to the "Atdabanian", which is used by geologists working in Siberia.

== Biostratigraphy ==
The oldest trilobite known is Lemdadella which appears at the beginning of the Fallotaspis zone. The Cambrian radiation of animal phyla ends here, after the diversification and origination of arthropods, molluscs, lophophorates, and chordates (including vertebrates), among others.
