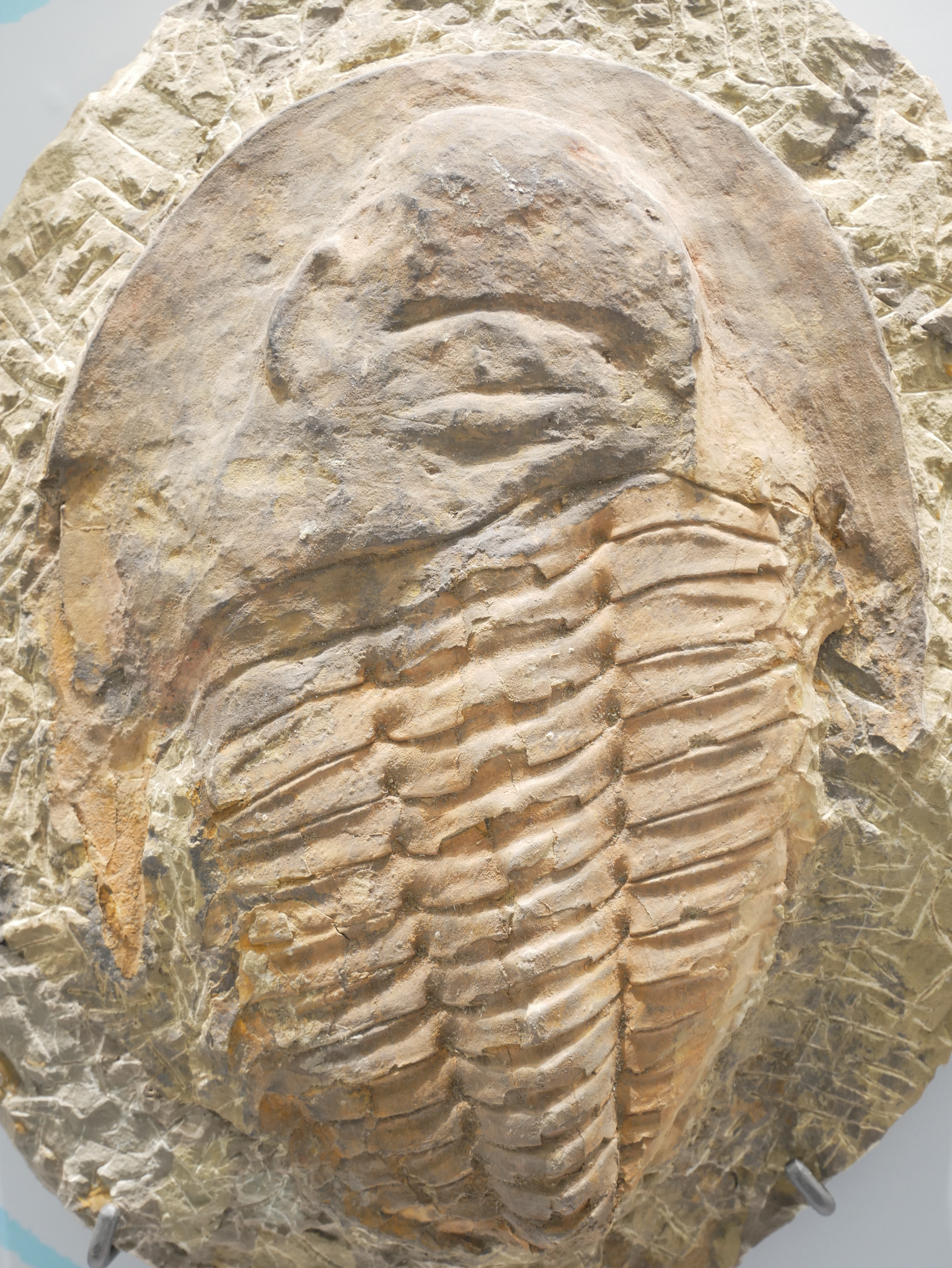
- Cambropallas telesto, from Morocco

Scientific classification
- Domain: Eukaryota
- Kingdom: Animalia
- Phylum: Arthropoda
- Class: †Trilobita
- Order: †Redlichiida; Richter, 1932

Suborders
- Olenellina; Redlichiina

= Redlichiida =

Redlichiida Temporal range: Cambrian Stage 3 – Middle Cambrian, 521–500 Ma

Extinct order of trilobites

Redlichiida is an order of trilobites, a group of extinct marine arthropods. Species assigned to the order Redlichiida are among the first trilobites to appear in the fossil record, about halfway during the Lower Cambrian. Due to the difficulty to relate sediments in different areas, there remains some discussion, but among the earliest are Fallotaspis (suborder Olenellina), and Lemdadella (suborder Redlichiina), both belonging to this order. The first representatives of the orders Corynexochida and Ptychopariida also appear very early on and may prove to be even earlier than any redlichiid species. In terms of anatomical comparison, the earliest redlichiid species are probably ancestral to all other trilobite orders and share many primitive characters. The last redlichiid trilobites died out before the end of the Middle Cambrian.

== Description ==
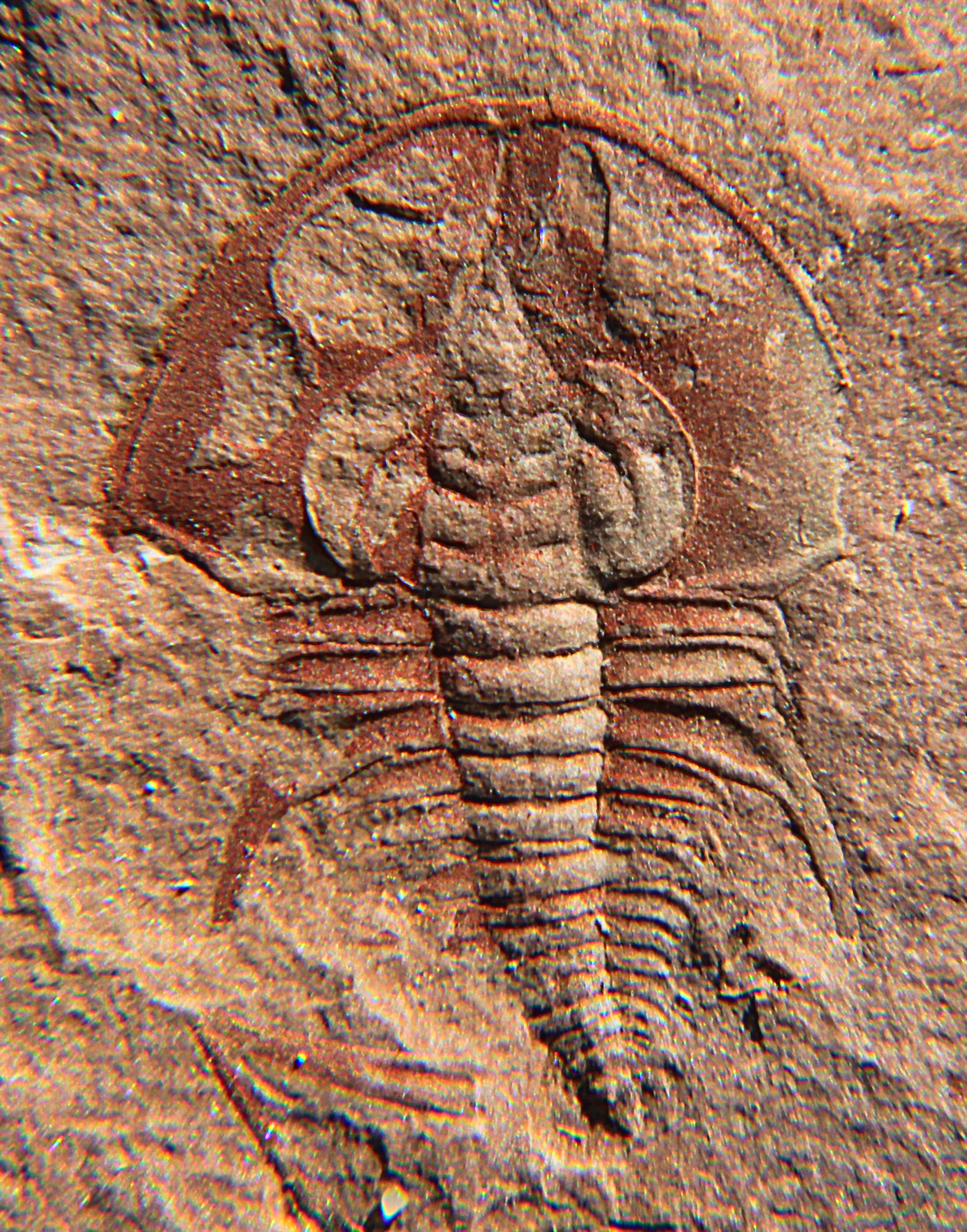
Olenellus chiefensis, suborder Olenellina, showing the visual surface has broken away, the lack of dorsal sutures, and the enlarged pleurae of the 3rd thorax segment from the front

Most redlichiids are rather flat (or have low dorso–ventral convexity) and their exoskeleton typically has an oval outline, about 1½× longer than wide. Each back edge of the headshield (or cephalon) very often carries a spine, termed a genal spine. The eye lobes are sickle-shaped, long and extend from the frontal lobe of the central raised area of the cephalon (or glabella) curving outward and increasingly backwards and sometimes eventually inwards again. The visual surface, that contains the calcite lenses is surrounded by fracture lines (or circumocular sutures), so that it has most often broken away from the rest of the cephalon. The glabella tapers forward and is relatively long, with the frontal lobe boss-like or pointy, followed by three rings or pairs of lobes (defined by furrows that may or may not cross over the midline), and finally at the back of the cephalon the so-called occipital ring. On the ventral side of the cephalon, the palate (or hypostome) is attached to the part of the calcified exoskeleton that defines the contour at the ventral side (the so-called doublure), a state called conterminant. The hypostomes of redlichiids have narrow borders, are not split into backward pointing forks, and have only small muscle attachment areas (or maculae). The articulate middle part of the exoskeleton (or thorax) is composed of many of segments that often end in a spine at the side of the animal. To each side of the central axis, the third segment from the front may have an exta large and wide rib (a state called macropleural). The tailshield (or pygidium) is small but appears to be composed of more than one segment. In Olenellina the earliest larval stage (called protaspis) has not been found, so it is presumed it was not calcified. The development of Redlichia from protaspis to adult was gradual without a metamorphosis at any stage.

Two major Lagerstätten where redlichiids are found are the Emu Bay shales of Southern Australia and the Maotianshan shales near Chengjiang in China. Other regions include Morocco, Labrador, Canada, the western United States, and Bohemia, Czech Republic.

The appendages have been preserved in a few specimens. They follow typical trilobite patterns in terms of the number, placement, and types of legs, antennae, gills, etc.

== Suborders ==
The order Redlichiida is divided into two suborders: Olenellina and Redlichiina. The main difference between the two groups is the lack of facial sutures in the Olenellina. This absence of the facial sutures is regarded as primitive by most scholars. Opisthoparian facial sutures are a shared character of all Redlichiina. In other trilobites, dorsal sutures may be opisthoparian, gonatoparian, proparian or they may be lost secondarily. The absence in the fossil record of the earliest larval stage, the protaspid, suggests that it may have been uncalcified, which would be a second unique character that distinguishes the Olenellina from all other trilobites.

Fossils of olenellinid trilobites are found in North America, and other associated areas that comprised the Cambrian continent of Laurentia. They are very common and are used to define the extent of Laurentia. Their abrupt disappearance marks the boundary between the Lower and the Middle Cambrian.

Fossils of redlichiinid are associated with Cambrian regions other than Laurentia.
