= Sailycaspis =

Sailycaspis Temporal range: Early Botomian

Scientific classification
- Kingdom: Animalia
- Phylum: Arthropoda
- Clade: †Artiopoda
- Class: †Trilobita
- Order: †Ptychopariida
- Family: †Ellipsocephalidae
- Genus: †Sailycaspis; Repina, 1965

Sailycaspis is an extinct genus of ptychopariid trilobites of the family Ellipsocephaloidea . It lived during the early part of the Botomian stage, which lasted from approximately 524 to 518.5 million years ago. This faunal stage was part of the Cambrian Period.
