= Asiatella =

Asiatella Temporal range: Botomian

Scientific classification
- Kingdom: Animalia
- Phylum: Arthropoda
- Clade: †Artiopoda
- Class: †Trilobita
- Order: †Ptychopariida
- Family: †Ellipsocephalidae
- Genus: †Asiatella; Repina, 1964

Genus of trilobites

Asiatella is an extinct genus from a well-known class of fossil marine arthropods, the trilobites. It lived during the Botomian stage, which lasted from approximately 520 to 516 million years ago. This faunal stage was part of the Cambrian Period.
