= Alataurus =

Alataurus Temporal range: Botomian

Scientific classification
- Domain: Eukaryota
- Kingdom: Animalia
- Phylum: Arthropoda
- Class: †Trilobita
- Order: †Ptychopariida
- Family: †Palaeolenidae
- Genus: †Alataurus; Repina, 1964

Genus of arthropods (fossil)

Alataurus is an extinct genus from a well-known class of fossil marine arthropods, the trilobites. It lived during the Botomian stage, which lasted from approximately 524 to 518.5 million years ago. This faunal stage was part of the Cambrian Period.
