= Xilingxia =

Xilingxia Temporal range: Late Botomian

Scientific classification
- Kingdom: Animalia
- Phylum: Arthropoda
- Class: Trilobita
- Order: Ptychopariida
- Family: Antagmidae
- Genus: Xilingxia Lu, 1980

Xilingxia is an extinct genus of ptychopariid trilobites in the family Antagmidae. It lived during the later part of the Botomian stage, which lasted from approximately 524 to 518.5 million years ago of the Cambrian Period.
