= Matania =

Matania Temporal range: Dresbachian

Scientific classification
- Domain: Eukaryota
- Kingdom: Animalia
- Phylum: Arthropoda
- Class: †Trilobita
- Order: †Ptychopariida
- Family: †Catillicephalidae
- Genus: †Matania; Rasetti, 1946

Extinct genus of arthropods

Matania is an extinct genus of ptychopariid trilobite in the family Catillicephalidae. It lived from 501 to 490 million years ago during the Dresbachian faunal stage of the late Cambrian Period. Most species are from Greenland, but some species are also found at the Cow Head formation in western Newfoundland, and at least one occurrence of the genus is in Kazakhstan
