= Chengkouia =

Chengkouia Temporal range: Botomian

Scientific classification
- Kingdom: Animalia
- Phylum: Arthropoda
- Clade: †Artiopoda
- Class: †Trilobita
- Order: †Ptychopariida
- Family: †Chengkouiidae
- Genus: †Chengkouia; Lu, Chang et al., 1974

Extinct genus of trilobites

Chengkouia is an extinct genus of trilobites. It lived in what is now China, during the Botomian stage, which lasted from approximately 524 to 518.5 million years ago, in the Cambrian Period.
