= Homodictya =

Homodictya Temporal range: Dresbachian

Scientific classification
- Kingdom: Animalia
- Phylum: Arthropoda
- Class: Trilobita
- Order: Ptychopariida
- Superfamily: Ptychoparioidea
- Family: Kingstoniidae
- Genus: Homodictya Raymond, 1937

Extinct genus of trilobytes

Homodictya is an extinct genus from a well-known class of fossil marine arthropods, the trilobites. It lived from 501 to 490 million years ago during the Dresbachian faunal stage of the late Cambrian Period.
