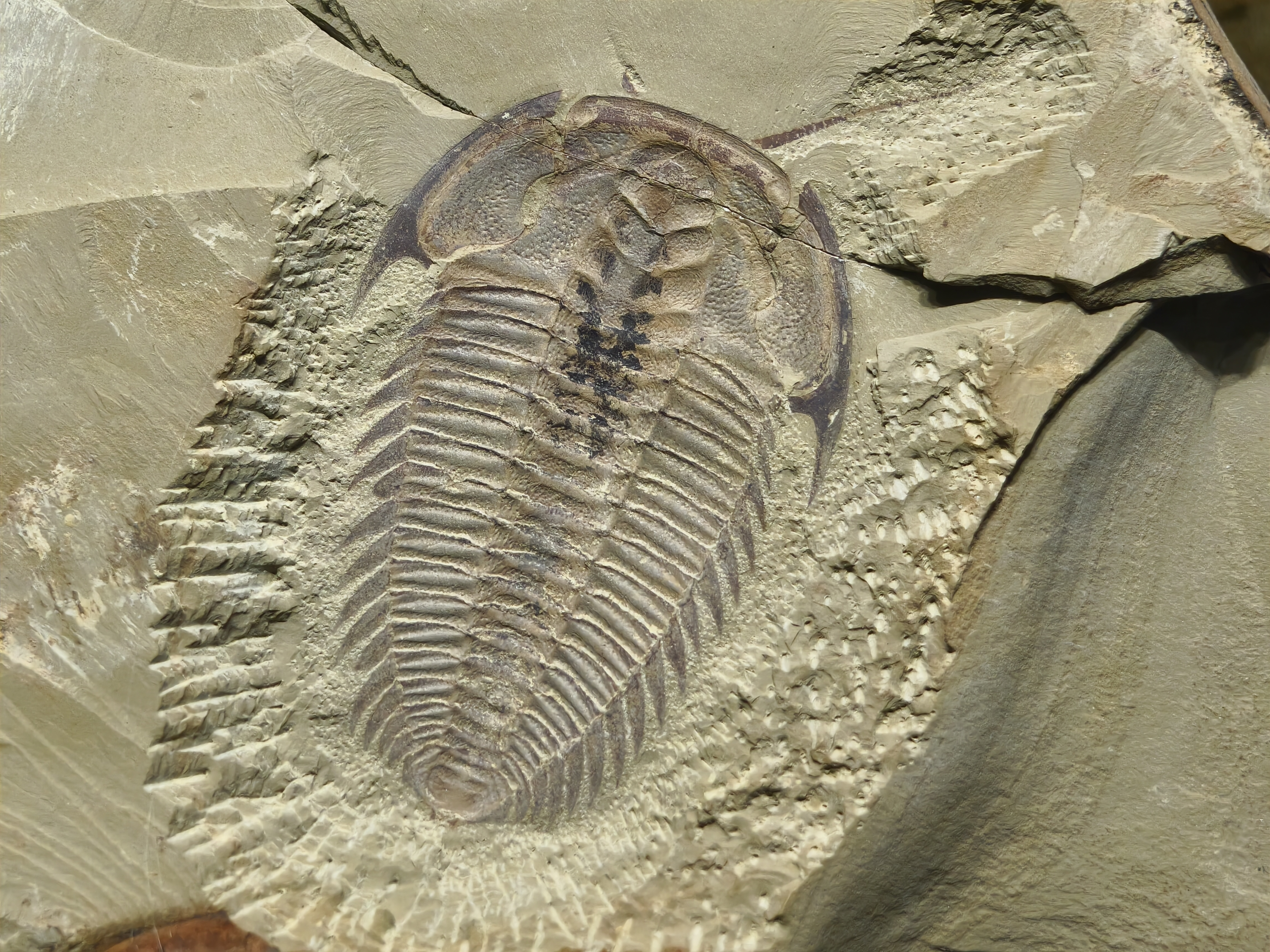
- Fossil of Kuanyangia pustulosa

Scientific classification
- Kingdom: Animalia
- Phylum: Arthropoda
- Clade: †Artiopoda
- Class: †Trilobita
- Order: †Redlichiida
- Family: †Redlichiidae
- Subfamily: †Wutingaspinae
- Genus: †Kuanyangia; Hupe, 1953

Type species
- Kuanyangia pustulosa (Lu, 1941)

Species
- K. bella Chen, 1983; K. granulosa Zhang, 1966; K. pustulosa (Lu, 1941); K. shaanxiensis Zhang & Lin, 1980

Synonyms
- Redlichia pustulosa (Lu, 1941)

= Kuanyangia =

Kuanyangia Temporal range: Early Botomian

Genus of arthropods (fossil)

Kuanyangia is an extinct genus from a well-known class of fossil marine arthropods, the trilobites. It lived during the early part of the Botomian stage, which lasted from approximately 524 to 518.5 million years ago. This faunal stage was part of the Cambrian Period.
