= Astenaspis =

Astenaspis Temporal range: Late Botomian

Scientific classification
- Kingdom: Animalia
- Phylum: Arthropoda
- Class: Trilobita
- Order: Redlichiida
- Family: Redlichinidae
- Genus: Astenaspis Suvorova, 1959

Extinct organism

Astenaspis is an extinct genus from a well-known class of fossil marine arthropods, the trilobites. It lived during the later part of the Botomian stage, which lasted from approximately 524 to 518.5 million years ago. This faunal stage was part of the Cambrian Period.
