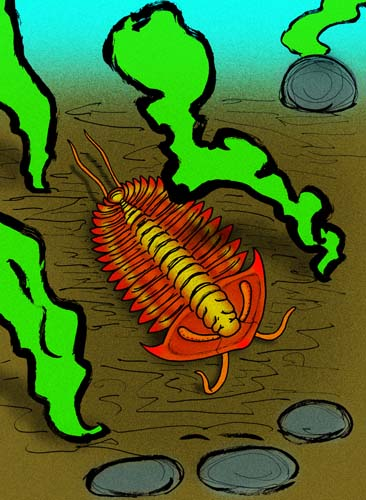
- Artist's reconstruction

Scientific classification
- Kingdom: Animalia
- Phylum: Arthropoda
- Clade: †Artiopoda
- Class: †Trilobita
- Order: †Redlichiida
- Family: †Redlichiidae
- Subfamily: †Wutingaspinae
- Genus: †Chengjiangaspis; Zhang et al., 1980
- Species: †C. chengjiangensis

Binomial name
- †Chengjiangaspis chengjiangensis Zhang et al., 1980

= Chengjiangaspis =

Chengjiangaspis Temporal range: Early Botomian

Extinct genus of trilobite

Chengjiangaspis chengjiangensis is an extinct redlichiid trilobite that lived during the early part of the Botomian stage, of the Early Cambrian period, which has lasted approximately 524 to 518.5 million years. It is a rare fossil found in strata just above the Maotianshan Shale, where the Chengjiang Biota are found.
