= Drepanuroides =

Drepanuroides Temporal range: Late Botomian

Scientific classification
- Kingdom: Animalia
- Phylum: Arthropoda
- Clade: †Artiopoda
- Class: †Trilobita
- Order: †Redlichiida
- Family: †Yinitidae
- Genus: †Drepanuroides; Chang, 1966

Drepanuroides is an extinct genus of trilobites. It lived during the later part of the Botomian stage, which lasted from approximately 524 to 518.5 million years ago during the Cambrian Period.
