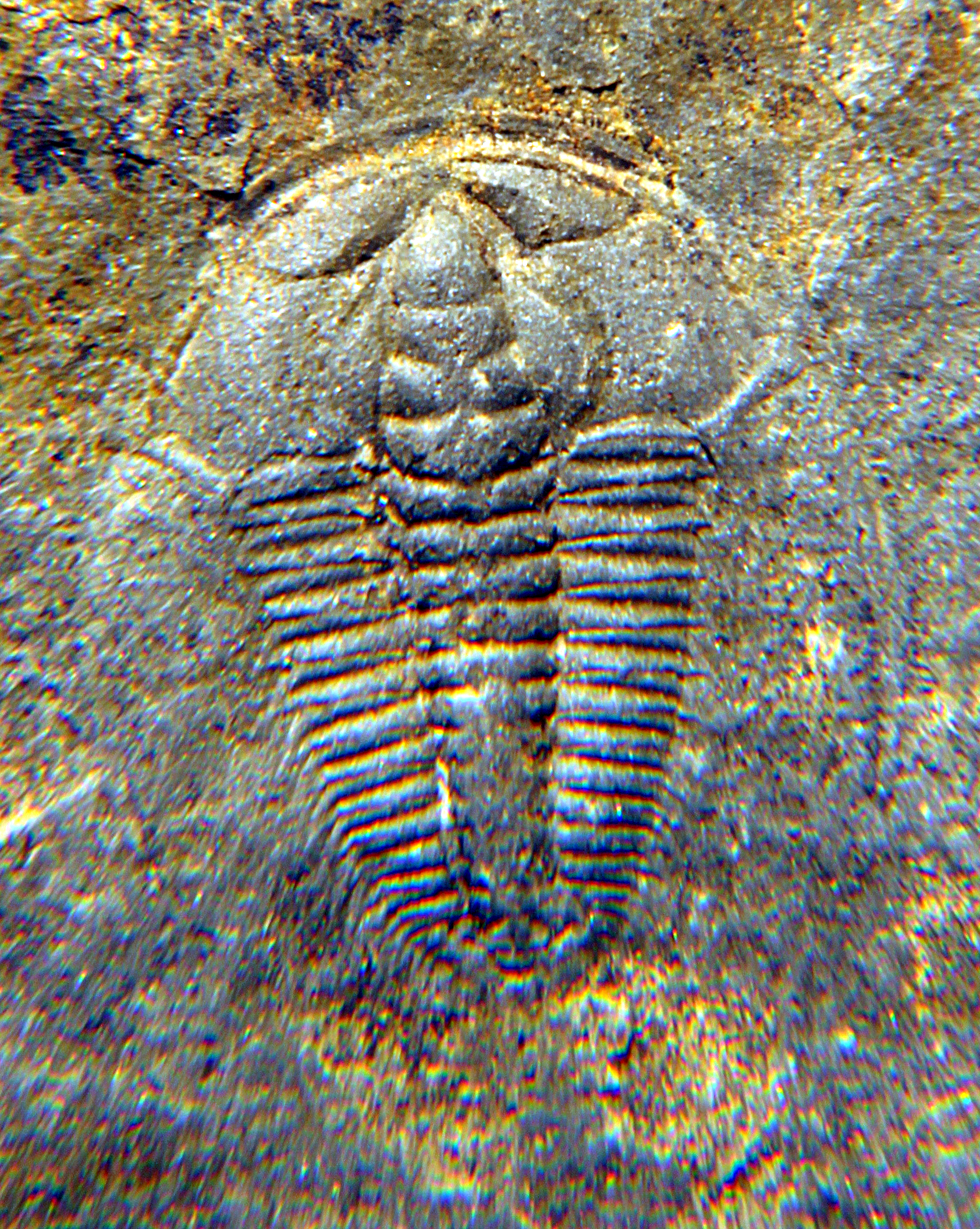

Scientific classification
- Kingdom: Animalia
- Phylum: Arthropoda
- Clade: †Artiopoda
- Class: †Trilobita
- Order: †Redlichiida
- Family: †Redlichiidae
- Genus: †Redlichia
- Species: †R. chinensis

Binomial name
- †Redlichia chinensis (Walcott, 1905)

= Redlichia chinensis =

Species of trilobite

Redlichia chinensis is an extinct species of trilobite that existed from 514 million years ago to 509 million years ago in the early Cambrian period (4th stage).

== Ecology ==
The species is a nektobenthic deposit feeder.

== History ==
R. chinensis was discovered by Chang in 1966 in the Balang formation, China. 19 fossils have been discovered.

== Morphology ==
R. chinensis has a wide cephalon with a border and the glaella tapers forwards. The hypostoma has been pushed through from the underside and the genal spines are not at the occipital edge. The thorax narrows to a small pygidium and the pleurae terminate in short spines. R. chinensis is 7.5 centimeters long.
