= Ushbaspis =

Ushbaspis Temporal range: Early Botomian

Scientific classification
- Kingdom: Animalia
- Phylum: Arthropoda
- Clade: †Artiopoda
- Class: †Trilobita
- Order: †Redlichiida
- Family: †Redlichiidae
- Subfamily: †Metaredlichiinae
- Genus: †Ushbaspis; Keller & Pokrovskaya, 1965

Ushbaspis is an extinct genus of redlichiid trilobites in the family Redlichiidae. It lived during the early part of the Botomian stage, which lasted from approximately 524 to 518.5 million years ago. This faunal stage was part of the Cambrian Period. Fossils of the genus have been found in the Shabakty Formation of Kazakhstan.
