= Meitanella =

Meitanella Temporal range: Late Botomian

Scientific classification
- Kingdom: Animalia
- Phylum: Arthropoda
- Clade: †Artiopoda
- Class: †Trilobita
- Order: †Redlichiida
- Family: †Yinitidae
- Genus: †Meitanella; Zhang et al., 1980

Extinct organism

Meitanella is an extinct genus from a well-known class of fossil marine arthropods, the trilobites. It lived during the later part of the Botomian stage, which lasted from approximately 524 million to 518.5 million years ago. This faunal stage was part of the Cambrian Period.
