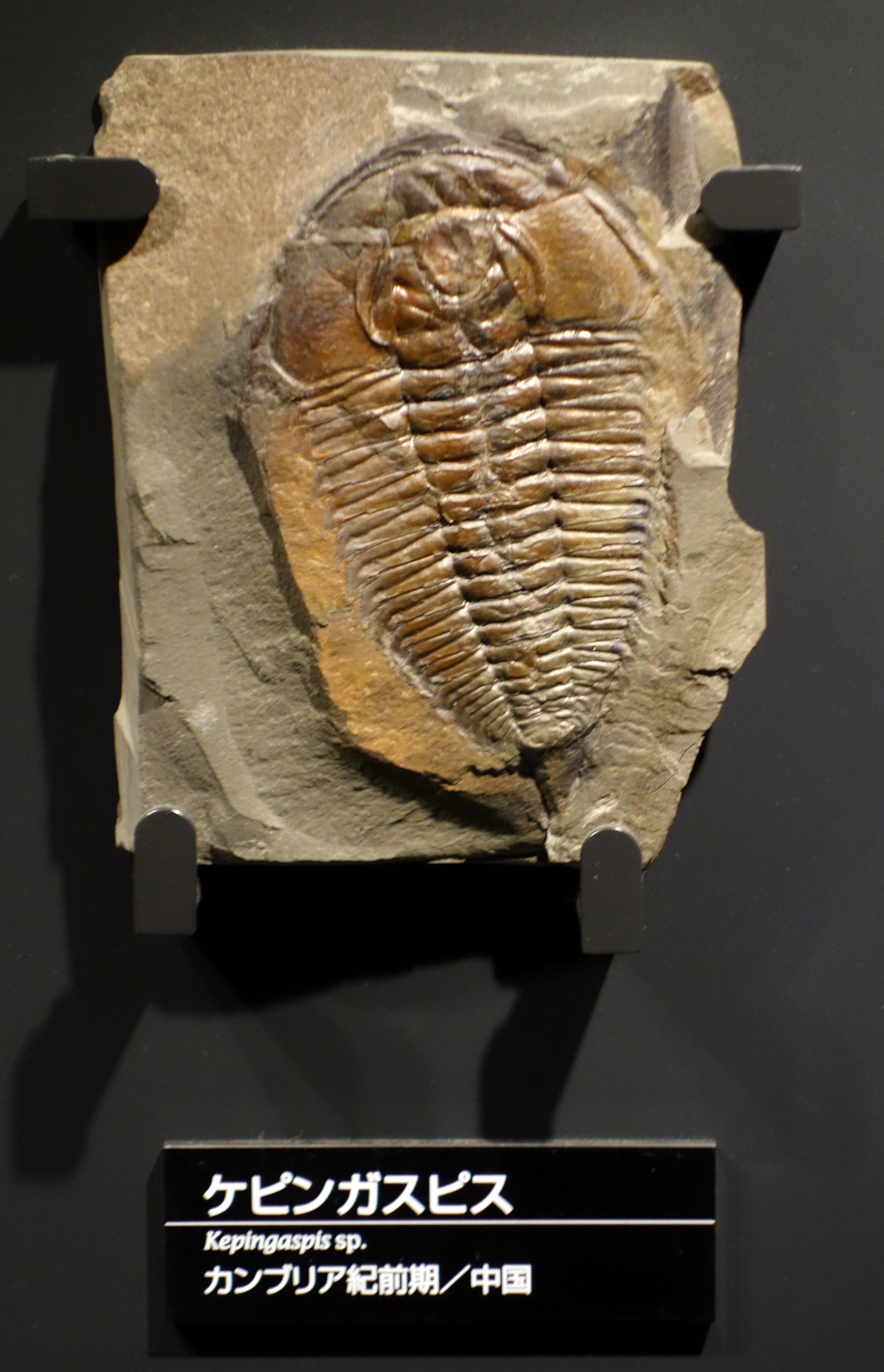
- Kepingaspis sp.

Scientific classification
- Kingdom: Animalia
- Phylum: Arthropoda
- Clade: †Artiopoda
- Class: †Trilobita
- Order: †Redlichiida
- Family: †Redlichiidae
- Subfamily: †Wutingaspinae
- Genus: †Kepingaspis; Chang, 1965

= Kepingaspis =

Kepingaspis Temporal range: Late Botomian

Kepingaspis is an extinct genus of redlichiid trilobite that lived during the later part of the Botomian stage, which lasted from approximately 524 to 518.5 million years ago. This faunal stage was part of the Cambrian Period.
