= Ejinaspis =

Ejinaspis Temporal range: Upper Cambrian

Scientific classification
- Kingdom: Animalia
- Phylum: Arthropoda
- Clade: †Artiopoda
- Class: †Trilobita
- Order: †Ptychopariida
- Family: †Solenopleuridae
- Genus: †Ejinaspis; Lu, Zhou & Zhou, 1986

Species
- Ejinaspis mirabilis

Genus of trilobites

Ejinaspis is a genus of trilobite. It was described from Upper Cambrian fossils found in Inner Mongolia, China in 1986. The genus is placed in the family Solenopleuridae.
