= Gustav Schwalbe =

Gustav Schwalbe may refer to:

- Gustav Christian Schwabe (1813–1897), German-born merchant and financier
- Gustav Albert Schwalbe (1844–1916), German anatomist and anthropologist
- Gustav Schwab (1792–1850), German writer, pastor and publisher
