= Redlich =

Redlich is a surname of Jewish-Austrian origin. Notable people with the surname include:

- Ed Redlich, American television producer
- Emil Redlich (1866–1930), Austrian neurologist
- Forrest Redlich, Australian independent screenwriter/producer
- Frederick Redlich (1910–2004), Jewish Austrian born American psychiatrist
- Hans Redlich (1903–1968), Austrian classical composer
- Monica Redlich (1909–1965), English writer
- Norman Redlich (1925–2011), American lawyer
- Oswald Redlich (1858–1944), Austrian historian
- Otto Redlich (1896–1978), Austrian born American physical chemist
- Patricia Redlich (1940–2011), Irish clinical psychologist
- Robert Redlich (born 1946), commissioner of the Victorian Independent Broad-based Anti-corruption Commission
- Shimon Redlich (born 1935), Israeli historian
- Vivian Redlich, a missionary killed in Papua New Guinea during World War II
- Warren Redlich (born 1966), American lawyer and politician

== See also ==
- Krystyna Kurczab-Redlich, Polish journalist
- Redlich–Obersteiner's zone, boundary in the central nervous system discovered by Emil Redlich
- Redlich–Kwong equation of state, equation in thermodynamics developed by Otto Redlich
