= Fuminaspis =

Fuminaspis Temporal range: Early Botomian

Scientific classification
- Kingdom: Animalia
- Phylum: Arthropoda
- Clade: †Artiopoda
- Class: †Trilobita
- Order: †Redlichiida
- Family: †Metadoxididae
- Genus: †Fuminaspis; Zhang & Lin, 1980

Fuminaspis is an extinct genus from a class of arthropods, the trilobites. It lived during the early part of the Botomian stage, which lasted from approximately 524 to 518.5 million years ago during the Cambrian Period.

== Scientific significance ==
As part of the Redlichiida order, Fuminaspis represents some of the earliest known trilobite lineages. Its fossil record helps paleontologists trace the morphological development of early arthropods and provides valuable data for stratigraphic correlations in Cambrian sedimentary sequences.
