= Solenoparia =

Solenoparia Temporal range: Cambrian

Scientific classification
- Kingdom: Animalia
- Phylum: Arthropoda
- Clade: †Artiopoda
- Class: †Trilobita
- Order: †Ptychopariida
- Family: †Solenopleuridae
- Genus: †Solenoparia; Kobayashi, 1935

Species
- †Solenoparia agno (Walcott, 1905); †Solenoparia conica (Yang et al., 1993); †Solenoparia jiangsuensis (Lin et al., 1983); †Solenoparia miaohouensis (Zhang et al., 1980); †Solenoparia minuta (Lu & Chang, 1974); †Solenoparia talingensis (Dames, 1883)

Solenoparia is an extinct genus from a well-known class of fossil marine arthropods, the trilobites. It lived during the Cambrian Period, which lasted from approximately 542 to 488 million years ago.
