= Heinrich Obersteiner =

Austrian neurologist

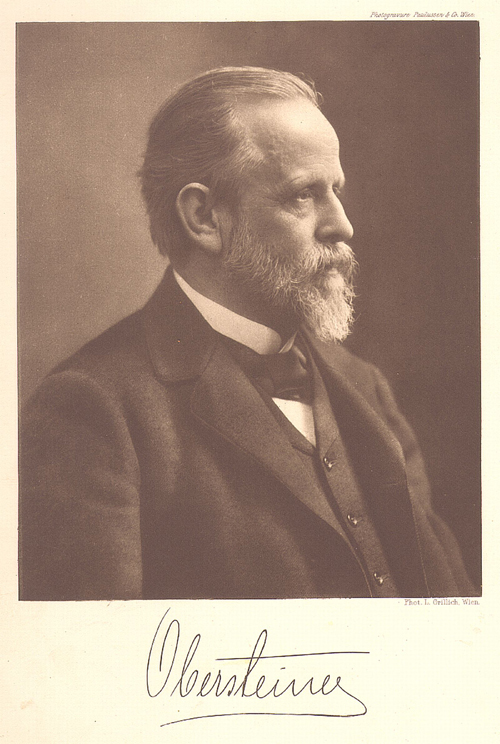
Heinrich Obersteiner (1847–1922)

Heinrich Obersteiner (13 November 1847 – 19 November 1922) was an Austrian neurologist born in Vienna.

In 1870 earned his doctorate from the University of Vienna, where he worked in the laboratory of Ernst Wilhelm von Brücke (1819–1892). In 1873 he earned his habilitation for pathology and anatomy of the nervous system at the University of Vienna, becoming an associate professor in 1880, and receiving the title of "full professor" in 1898. He was also director of a private mental institution at Oberdöbling, outside of Vienna. In 1882 he established an internationally known neurological institute in Vienna.

The eponymous Obersteiner–Redlich line is named after him, along with Emil Redlich (1866–1930). This zone is where the central nervous system and peripheral nervous system meet, as well as the place where Schwann cells meet oligodendroglia cells.

== Written works ==
- Anleitung beim Studium des baues der nervösen Centralorgane im gesunden und kranken Zustande. Leipzig and Vienna, 1888; fifth edition, 1912. translated into English, French, Italian, and Russian. English translation by Alexander Hill as "Introduction to the Study of the Anatomy of the Central Nervous Organs in Health and Disease" (1890).
- Die Lehre vom Hypnotismus. Leipzig and Vienna, 1893 – Lessons on hypnotism.
- Die Krankheiten des Rückenmarks, with Emil Redlich. in Ebstein and Schwalbe's Handbuch der praktischen Medizin, in Verbindung mit Zahlreichen Gelehrten.
- Makroskopische Untersuchung des Zentralnervensystems, in Alberhalden's Handbuch der biologischen Arbeitsmethoden, part 8, T. 1; Berlin and Vienna, Urban & Schwarzenberg, 1924 – Macroscopic examination of the central nervous system.
