= Olgaspis =

Olgaspis Temporal range: Late Botomian

Scientific classification
- Kingdom: Animalia
- Phylum: Arthropoda
- Clade: †Artiopoda
- Class: †Trilobita
- Order: †Redlichiida
- Family: †Redlichiidae
- Subfamily: †Neoredlichiinae
- Genus: †Olgaspis; Korobeinikova, 1965

Olgaspis is an extinct genus of trilobite arthropods. Species lived during the later part of the Botomian stage, which lasted from approximately 524 to 518.5 million years ago. This faunal stage was part of the Cambrian Period.
