= Weeksina =

Weeksina Temporal range: Dresbachian

Scientific classification
- Kingdom: Animalia
- Phylum: Arthropoda
- Clade: †Artiopoda
- Class: †Trilobita
- Order: †Ptychopariida
- Family: †Lonchocephalidae
- Genus: †Weeksina; Resser, 1935

Species
- Weeksina unispina (Walcott, 1916) (type) = Asaphiscus unispinus

Genus of trilobites

Weeksina is a genus of trilobites, an extinct group of marine arthropods. It lived during the Dresbachian faunal stage of the late Cambrian Period which lasted from 501 to 490 million years ago. Its calcified dorsal exoskeleton has an inverted egg-shape. Characteristics of this trilobite are the backward directed spine on the 8th of 10 segment of the articulated middle part of the body (or thorax), and the second pair of furrows from the back on the raised central part of the headshield (or cephalon) called glabella, which curve from inward to fully backward, almost isolating a pair of lobes, just in front of the occipital ring, that is defined by a furrow that crosses the entire width of the glabella. Weeksina is known only from the Weeks Formation at North Canyon, House Range, Millard County, Utah.
