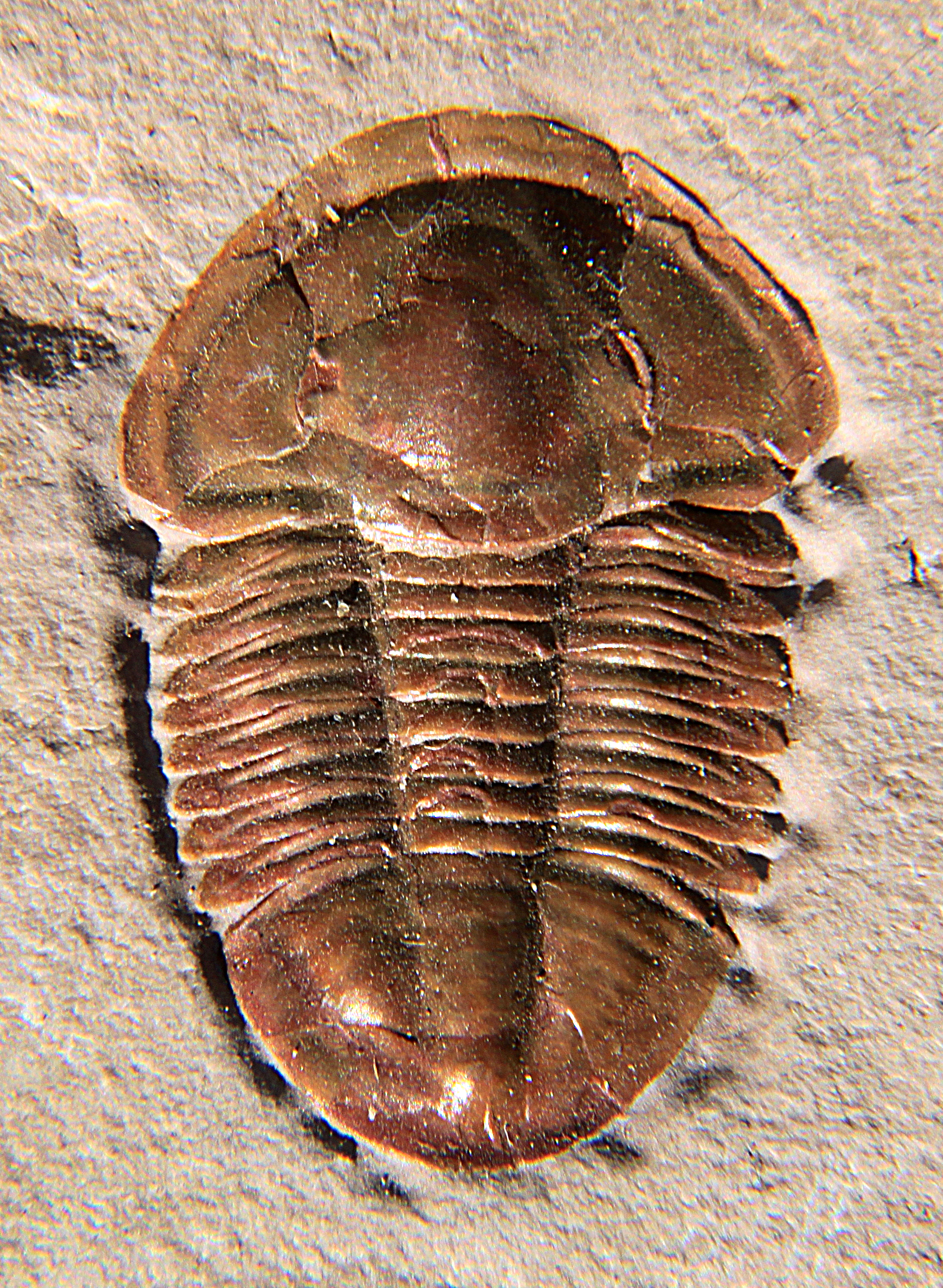
- Asaphiscus wheeleri, Cambrian shale, Utah

Scientific classification
- Domain: Eukaryota
- Kingdom: Animalia
- Phylum: Arthropoda
- Class: †Trilobita
- Order: †Ptychopariida
- Family: †Asaphiscidae
- Genus: †Asaphiscus; Meek, 1873

Type species
- Asaphiscus wheeleri Meek, 1873

Species
- A. wheeleri Meek, 1873; A. laeviceps Walcott, 1884 Synonyms: Ptychoparia laeviceps, Eteraspis laeviceps

Synonyms
- Eteraspis Resser, 1935

= Asaphiscus =

Asaphiscus Temporal range: 516–498 Ma Middle Cambrian

Genus of trilobites

Asaphiscus is a genus of trilobite that lived in the Cambrian. Its remains have been found in Australia and North America, especially in Utah.

== Distribution ==
A. wheeleri occurs in the Middle Cambrian of the United States (Delamaran, Lower Wheeler Shale, Millard County, Utah, 40.0°N, 113.0°W; and Menevian, Wheeler Formation, House Range, Utah, 39.2° N, 113.3° W).

== Description ==
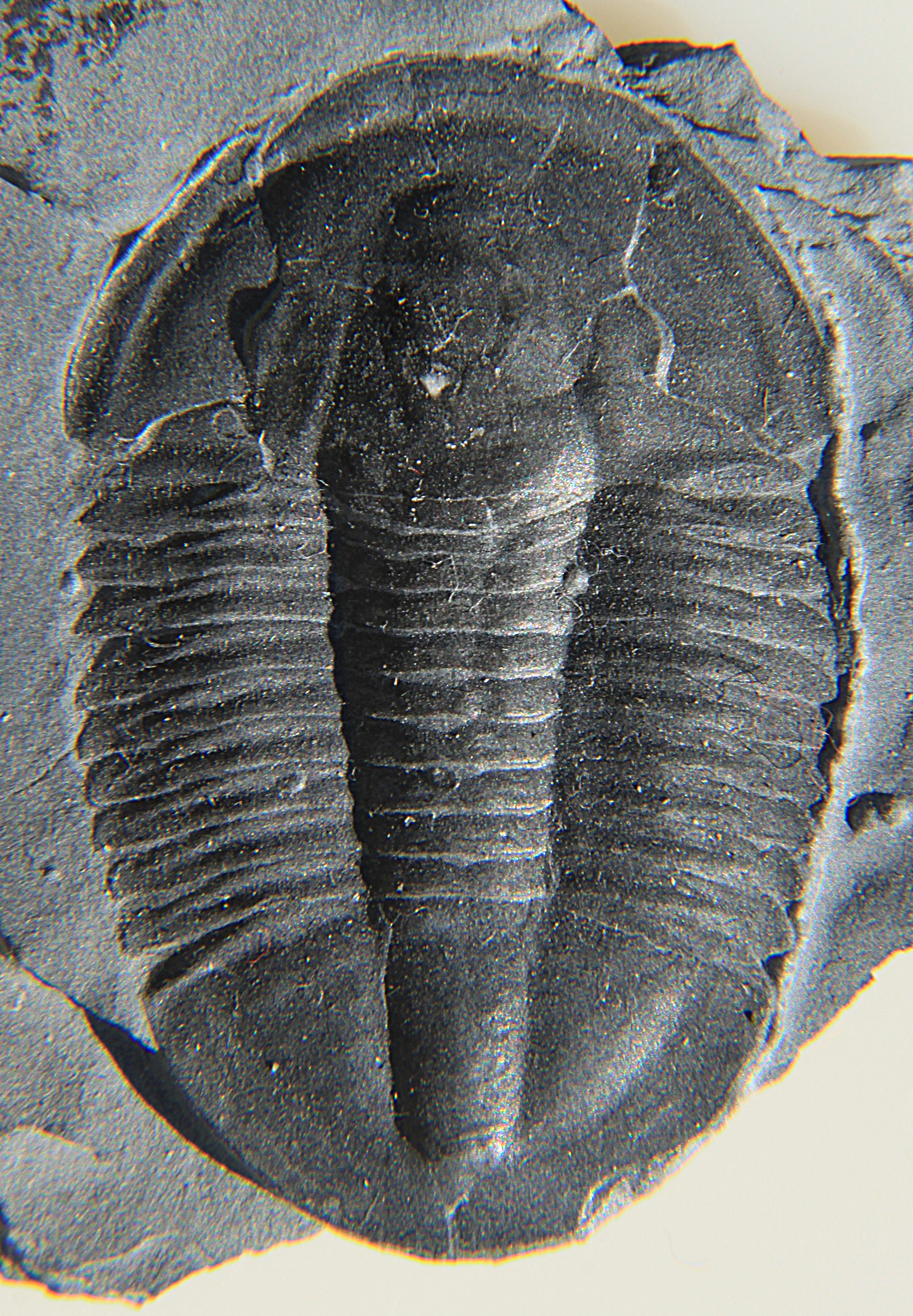
Asaphiscus wheeleri, 37 mm long

Asaphiscus are average size trilobites of (up to 8 centimetres or 3.1 inches) with a rather flat calcified dorsal exoskeleton of inverted egg-shaped outline, about 1 1/2× longer than wide, with the widest point near the back of the headshield (or cephalon). The cephalon is about 40% of the body length, is semi-circular in shape, has wide rounded genal angles, and a well defined border of about 1/8× the length of the cephalon. The central raised area of the cephalon (or glabella) is conical in outline with a wide rounded front and is separated from the border by a preglabellar field of about 1/8× the length of the cephalon, and has 3 sets of furrows that may be clear or inconspicuous. The articulated middle part of the body (or thorax) has 7-11 segments (9 in A. wheeleri), with rounded tips. The tailshield (or pygidium) is about 30% of the body length, is semi-circular in shape, with a wide flat border, and an entire margin.

== Reassigned species ==
Some species originally described as belonging to Asaphiscus have later been reassigned to other genera.

- A. capella = Glyphaspis capella
- A. granulatus = Genevievella granulata
- A. gregarius = Blainia gregarius
- A. minor = Cedaria minor
- A. unispinus = Weeksina unispina

== Sources ==
- A Pictorial Guide to Fossils by Gerard Ramon Case
