= Cambrian–Ordovician extinction event =

Mass extinction event about 488 million years ago

The blue graph shows the apparent percentage (not the absolute number) of marine animal genera becoming extinct during any given time interval. It does not represent all marine species, just those that are readily fossilized. The labels of the traditional "Big Five" extinction events and the more recently recognised Capitanian mass extinction event are clickable links; see Extinction event for more details. (source and image info)

The Cambrian–Ordovician extinction event, also known as the Cambrian-Ordovician boundary event, was an extinction event that occurred approximately 485 million years ago (mya) in the Paleozoic era of the early Phanerozoic eon. It was preceded by the less-documented (but probably more extensive) End-Botomian mass extinction around 517 million years ago, and the Dresbachian extinction event about 502 million years ago.

The Cambrian–Ordovician extinction event ended the Cambrian period, and led into the subsequent Ordovician period. It eliminated many brachiopods and conodonts, and severely reduced the number of trilobite species.

== Causes ==
Volcanic activity, particularly that of large igneous provinces, has been speculated to have been the cause of the environmental crisis. The emplacement of the Namaqualand–Garies dykes in South Africa has been dated to 485 mya, the time at which the Cambrian–Ordovician extinction event occurred, although there remains no unambiguous evidence of a relationship between this volcanism and the biotic turnover. Anoxia and changes in sea level have also been proposed as potential causal factors. The middle Cambrian to early Ordovician is characterized by persistent elevated extinction rates that are thought to have been maintained by anoxic conditions. A decrease in the anoxic conditions of the Cambrian, and an increase in euxinic conditions (or an increase in hydrogen sulfide concentrations) of the Early Ordovician are also believed to be an initiator of the Great Ordovician Biodiversification Event.

== Effects on life ==
Trilobites were among the hardest hit organisms by the extinction. Shallow shelf trilobite faunas were hit particularly hard. Trilobites that inhabited the outer edges of shelf environments and slope environments, on the other hand, were minimally impacted by the event. Many trilobites appear to have been adapted to the anoxic conditions of the Cambrian through symbiosis with the sulfur-oxidizing bacteria.

== Controversy ==
Soft-body fossils with morphology characteristic of the Cambrian have been uncovered in Morocco, dated 20 million years post-extinction. The 2010 paper by Roy, Orr, Botting, and their collaborators that announced the discovery suggests that Cambrian species persisted into the mid-Paleozoic. They argue that what had been interpreted as a Cambrian-Ordovician extinction is instead an artifact resulting from a gap in the stratigraphic record. Remains of soft-bodied animals prevalent in earlier, exceptional Cambrian fossil beds were only preserved in later, Ordovician deposits in rare places where special conditions promoted fossilization of soft bodies.

== See also ==
- End-Botomian mass extinction, circa 517 mya
- Dresbachian extinction event, circa 502 mya
- Geologic time scale
- Furongian, Late or Upper Cambrian period
- Early Ordovician period
