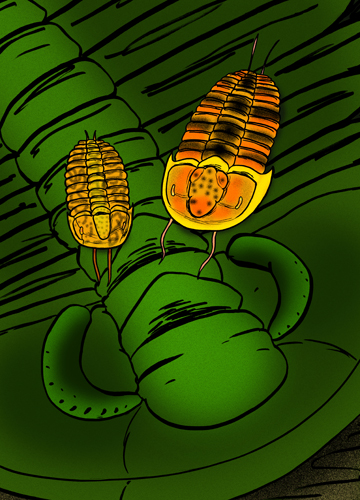
- Juvenile and adult C. lemdadensis resting on Acadoparadoxides sp.

Scientific classification
- Kingdom: Animalia
- Phylum: Arthropoda
- Clade: †Artiopoda
- Class: †Trilobita
- Order: †Ptychopariida
- Genus: †Cambroproteus; Geyer, 2015
- Species: †C. lemdadensis

Binomial name
- †Cambroproteus lemdadensis Geyer, 2015

= Cambroproteus =

Cambroproteus Temporal range: Miaolingian

Genus of ptychopariid trilobite

Cambroproteus is a genus of ptychopariid trilobite from the Cambrian series 2 and Miaolingian of Morocco. It has a single known species, Cambroproteus lemdadensis, whose various features are shared with disparate groups of other ptychopariids, which make it difficult to place within other established ptychopariid families.

== Etymology ==
The generic name translates as "Cambrian Proteus." This is in reference to the situation of how its varied features stymy understanding of its placement within Ptychopariida, effectively making it a marine shapeshifter.
