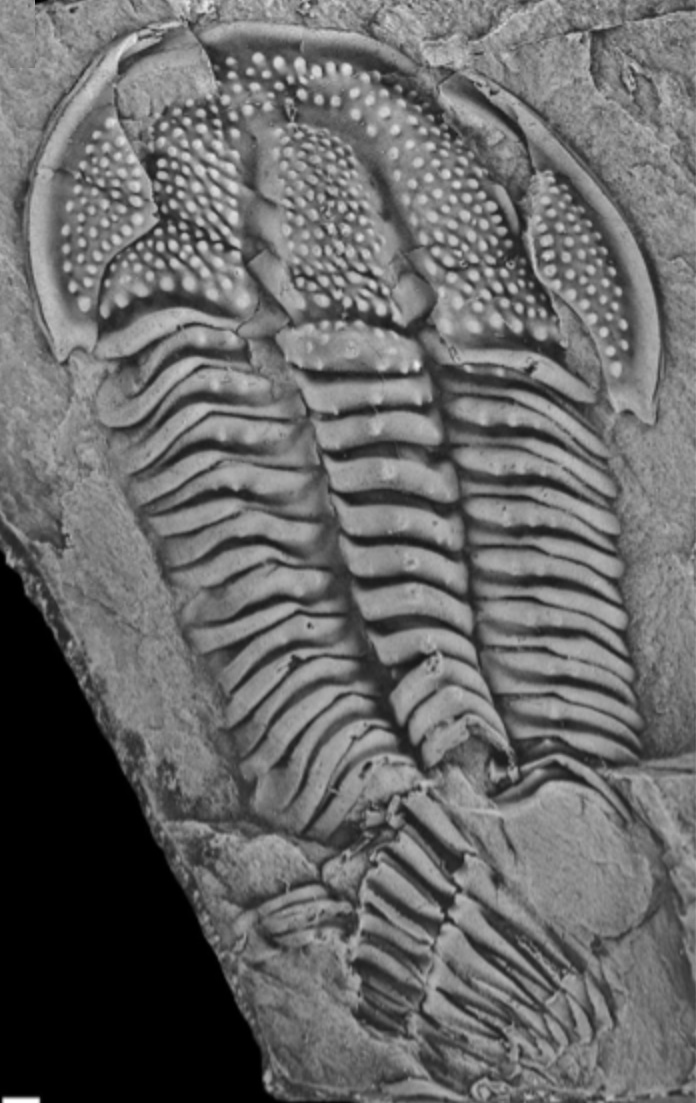
- Solenopleuropsis variolaris

Scientific classification
- Kingdom: Animalia
- Phylum: Arthropoda
- Clade: †Artiopoda
- Class: †Trilobita
- Order: †Ptychopariida
- Superfamily: †Ptychoparioidea
- Family: †Solenopleuridae; Angelin, 1854

= Solenopleuridae =

Family of trilobites

Solenopleuridae is a family of trilobites, containing the following genera:

- Abakanopleura
- Acanthometopus
- Acrocephalaspis
- Aiaiaspis
- Aidarella
- Aikhaliella
- Albansia
- Aldanaspis
- Badulesia
- Bigranulella
- Bijelina
- Braintreella
- Canotaspis
- Catasolenopleura
- Changqingia
- Colliceps
- Conicephalus
- Crusoia
- Daldynaspis
- Datongites
- Denaspis
- Eilura
- Ejinaspis
- Erratojincella
- Foveatella
- Gonzaloia
- Gushanaspis
- Herse
- Huzhuia
- Hyperoparia
- Jiagouia
- Jincella
- Kabuqiia
- Kaipingella
- Karagandoides
- Keguqinia
- Lashushania
- Levisia
- Lingyuanaspis
- Liosolenopleura
- Maiaspis
- Manublesia
- Markhaspis
- Mataninella
- Menocephalites
- Minupeltis
- Mukrania
- Munija
- Neoacrocephalites
- Neosolenopleurella
- Nilegna
- Ninaspis
- Notocoryphe
- Paracrocephalites
- Paramenocephalites
- Parasolenoparia
- Parasolopleurena
- Parayabeia
- Pardailhania
- Perneraspis
- Pingluia
- Plesisolenoparia
- Proavus
- Protrachoparia
- Pseudosolenoparia
- Reillopleura
- Rimouskia
- Rina
- Sao
- Shanghaiaspis
- Sohopleura
- Solenoparia
- Solenoparops
- Solenopleura
- Solenopleurella
- Solenopleuropsis
- Squarrosoella
- Suyougouia
- Tabalqueia
- Tangwangzhaia
- Tjungiella
- Trachoparia
- Usumunaspis
- Velieuxia
- Wafangdiania
- Xianfengia
- Yabeia
