= Emil Redlich =

Austrian-Jewish neurologist

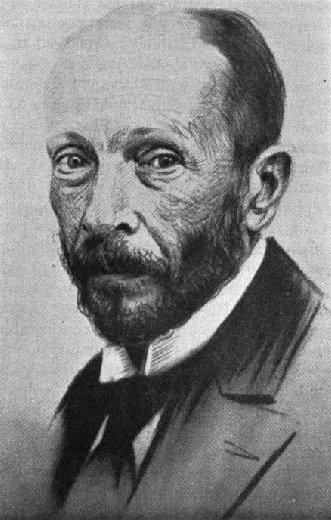
Emil Redlich (1866–1930)

Emil Redlich (18 January 1866 – 9 June 1930) was an Austrian-Jewish neurologist born in Brünn.

In 1889, he received his doctorate from the University of Vienna, and later performed anatomical research of the brain at Heinrich Obersteiner’s institute. In 1895, he was a medical assistant at Julius Wagner-Jauregg's neurological institute, and in 1898 became head of a private mental institution in Inzersdorf, outside of Vienna. In 1914, he was appointed director of the Nervenheilanstalt Maria-Theresia-Schlössel in Vienna.

His name is associated with Redlich–Obersteiner's zone; the anatomical location where the central nervous system meets the peripheral nervous system. He also described a type of abortive disseminated encephalomyelitis with lesions scattered throughout the spinal cord and brain. This disorder was to become known as "Redlich–Flatau syndrome", named along with Edward Flatau (1868–1932), who stated that a virus could be the cause of the disease.

== Bibliography ==
- Die Pathologie der tabischen Hinterstrangserkrankungen. Jena, 1897.
- Die spastische Spinalparalyse und die hereditäre spastische Spinalparalyse. – On spastic spinal paralysis and hereditary spastic spinal paralysis.
- Über multiple Sklerose. – On multiple sclerosis.
- Neuere Untersuchungsbehelfe in der Diagnostik der Hirnkrankheiten. In: Deutsche Klinik, volume 6, 1; Berlin and Vienna, 1906.
- Die Krankheiten des Rückenmarks. (with Heinrich Obersteiner), In: Wilhelm Ebstein (1836–1912) and Gustav Albert Schwalbe (1844–1916) – publishers: Handbuch der praktischen Medizin, in Verbindung mit Zahlreichen Gelehrten. Stuttgart, 1906.
- Die Psychosen bei Gehirnerkrankungen. In: Handbuch der Psychiatrie, spez. T., part 3, 2, 1; Leipzig and Vienna, 1912.
- Hirntumor. In: Handbuch der Neurologie, volume 3, Berlin, 1912.
- Uber Rückbildungserscheinungen bei fällen mit dem klinischen bilde der gehirngeschwulst. Leipzig and Vienna, 1913
- Epilepsie. In: Handbuch der Neurologie, supplementary volume, Berlin, 1920.
