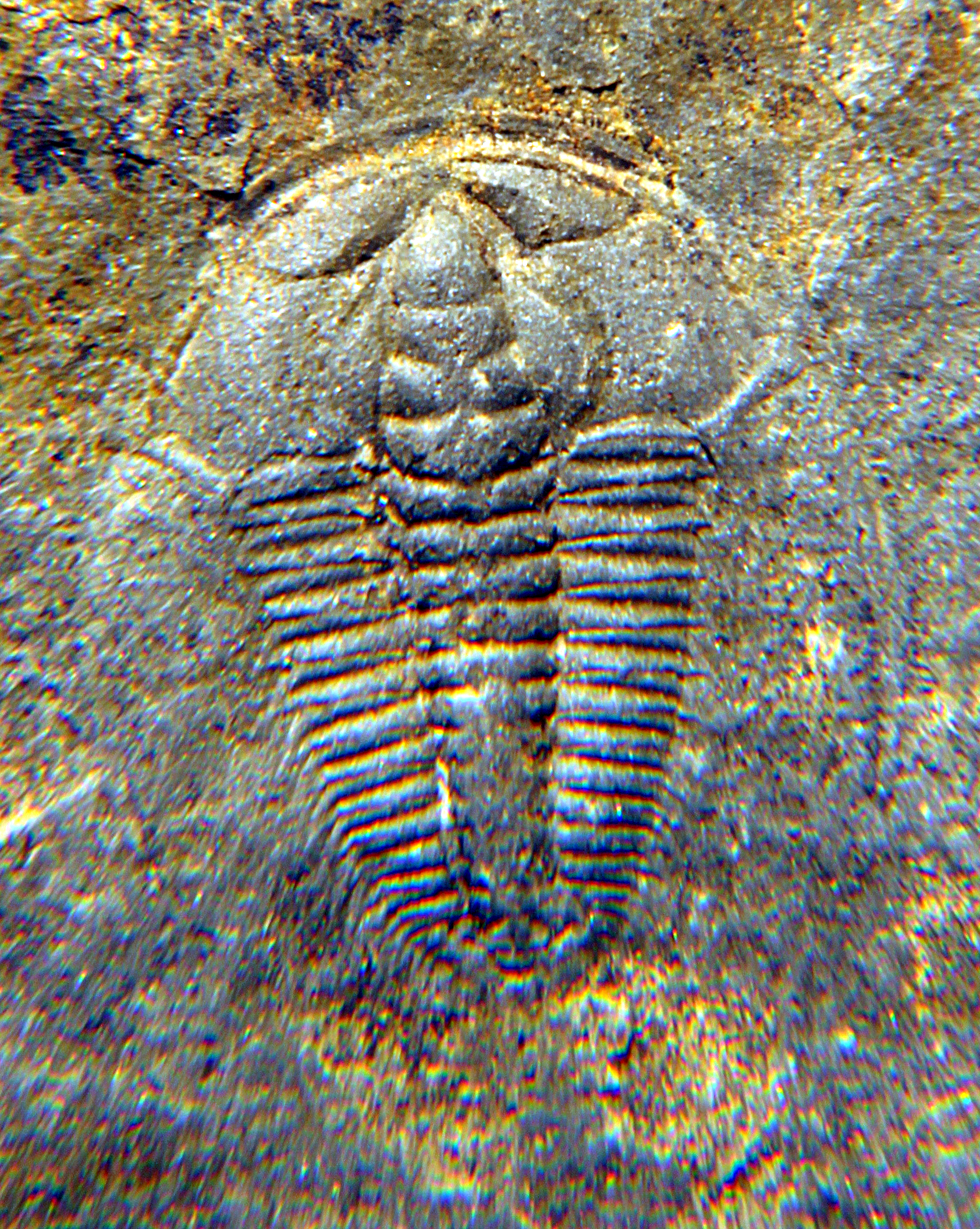
- Redlichia chinensis

Scientific classification
- Kingdom: Animalia
- Phylum: Arthropoda
- Clade: †Artiopoda
- Class: †Trilobita
- Order: †Redlichiida
- Family: †Redlichiidae
- Subfamily: †Redlichiinae
- Genus: †Redlichia; Cossmann, 1902

Type species
- Hoeferia noetlingi Redlich, 1899

Species
- R. noetlingi (Redlich, 1899) (Type) synonym Hoeferia noetlingi; R. advialis Öpik, 1970; R. amadeana Öpik, 1970; R. chinensis Walcott, 1905; R. creta Öpik, 1970; R. endoi Lu, 1950; R. forresti (Etheridge, 1890) synonym Olenellus forresti; R. guizhouensis Zhou, 1974; R. gumridgensis Laurie, 2004; R. idonea Whitehouse, 1939; R. lepta Öpik, 1970; R. petita Öpik, 1970; R. rex Holmes, Paterson & García-Bellido, 2019; R. mayalis Öpik, 1970; R. mansuyi Endo & Resser, 1937; R. mai Lu, 1941; R. micrograpta Öpik, 1970; R. takooensis Lu, 1950; R. venulosa (Whitehouse, 1939) synonym Mesodema venulosa; R. versabunda Öpik, 1970; R. vertumnia Öpik, 1970

Synonyms
- Hoeferia Redlich, 1899 non Bittner, 1894; Mesodema Whitehouse, 1939; Dongshania Lin in Qiu et al., 1983; Spinoredlichia Liu, 1975

= Redlichia =

Redlichia Temporal range: Toyonian/Ordian

Extinct genus of trilobites

Redlichia is a genus of redlichiid trilobite in the family Redlichiidae, with large to very large species (up to 35 centimetres or 14 inches long). They are characterised by a flat body plan, prominent genial spines and for some species, a distinguished axial spine. Fossils of various species are found in Lower Cambrian (Toyonian)-aged marine strata from China, Korea, Pakistan, the Himalayas, Iran, Spain, southern Siberia, and Antarctica, and from Middle Cambrian (Ordian)-aged marine strata of Australia.

== Description ==
Redlichia has a rather flat and thinly calcified dorsal exoskeleton of inverted egg-shaped outline, about 1½× longer than wide, measured across the base of the genal spines and disregarding the spine on the 11th segment of the articulated middle part of the body (or thorax). The headshield (or cephalon) is semicircular, about ⅓× as long as the body, with clear genal spines that are a smooth continuation of the border, that extend backward and outward and curving to be near parallel near their tips, which typically extend to the backhalf of the articulated middle part of the body (or thorax). The thorax consists of 11-17 segments, with the 11th from the front bearing a backward directed spine on the midline.

== Taxonomy ==
Redlich originally named the genus Hoeferia in 1899. It turned out however, that this name was already given to an arcid bivalve by Bittner in 1894, rendering it an unavailable junior homonym. This is why in 1902, Cossmann renamed Hoeferia Redlich, 1899 as Redlichia, in honor of Redlich.

Mesodema Whitehouse, 1939, Dongshania Lin in Qiu et al., 1983, and Spinoredlichia Liu, 1975, are all considered to be synonyms of Redlichia.

=== Notable species ===
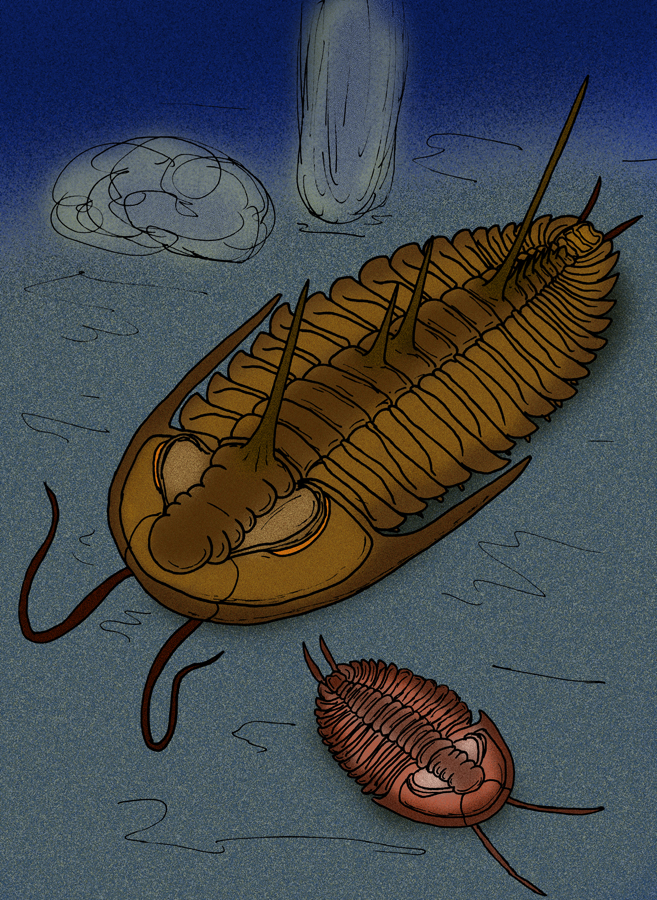
Comparison of the redlichiid trilobites, Redlichia rex (larger), and R. takooensis, from the Lower Cambrian Kangaroo Island, Australia

The type species, R. noetlingi, is found in Lower Cambrian-aged marine strata of Western Pakistan (and later also found in both Palaeolenus and Megapalaeolenus zones of the Guanshan Biota). A similar species, R. chinensis, is found in Lower Cambrian-aged marine strata of China. R. nobilis, is found in Lower Cambrian-aged marine strata of South Korea. It was originally thought that the Kangaroo Island species, R. takooensis, had a small form and a large form: more thorough studies have concluded that the "large morph" is a distinct, carnivorous, possibly cannibalistic species now named R. rex.

== Reassigned species ==
Some of the species that were originally assigned to Redlichia were later moved to other genera.

- R. blanckenhorni = Redlichops blanckenhorni
- R. finalis = Redlichaspis finalis
- R. nakamurai = Neoredlichia nakamurai
- R. walcotti Lu, 1941= Archaeops lui
- R. walcotti Mansuy, 1912= Saukandiops walcotti
- R. cf. walcotti Saito, 1934= Latiredlichia saitoi
