= Diceratocephalidae =

Scientific classification
- Kingdom: Animalia
- Phylum: Arthropoda
- Clade: †Artiopoda
- Class: †Trilobita
- Order: †Ptychopariida
- Suborder: †Ptychopariina
- Superfamily: †Ptychoparioidea
- Family: †Diceratocephalidae; Lu, 1954

Extinct family of trilobites

Diceratocephalidae is a family of trilobites belonging to the order Ptychopariida.

== Genera ==
- Anopocodia
- Aulacodigma
- Cyclolorenzella
- Diceratocephalus
- Fenghuangella
- Hwangjuella
- Jiangnania
- Tangshihlingia
- Tholifrons
- Torifera
- Xiangia
