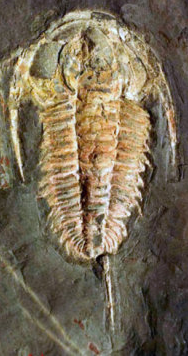
- Redlichia takooensis (Lower Cambrian Emu Shale, Kangaroo Island, South Australia)

Scientific classification
- Kingdom: Animalia
- Phylum: Arthropoda
- Clade: †Artiopoda
- Class: †Trilobita
- Order: †Redlichiida
- Family: †Redlichiidae
- Genus: †Redlichia
- Species: †R. takooensis

Binomial name
- †Redlichia takooensis (Lu, 1950)

= Redlichia takooensis =

Extinct species of trilobite

Redlichia takooensis is a species of redlichiid trilobite from the lower Cambrian-aged Emu Shale of Kangaroo Island, Australia.
