= Meniscopsia =

Meniscopsia Temporal range: Mid Cambrian

Scientific classification
- Domain: Eukaryota
- Kingdom: Animalia
- Phylum: Arthropoda
- Class: †Trilobita
- Order: †Ptychopariida
- Family: †incertae sedis
- Genus: †Meniscopsia
- Species: †M. beebi

Binomial name
- †Meniscopsia beebi Robison & Babcock 2011

Genus of trilobites

Meniscopsia is a genus of trilobite known from mid-Cambrian Lagerstätten of the western United States. The sediment-filled guts and the digestive glands of some specimens are preserved, indicating a predatory habit.
