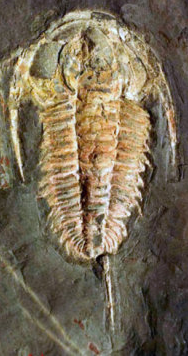
- Redlichia takooensis

Scientific classification
- Kingdom: Animalia
- Phylum: Arthropoda
- Clade: †Artiopoda
- Class: †Trilobita
- Order: †Redlichiida
- Superfamily: †Redlichioidea
- Family: †Redlichiidae; Poulsen, 1927

Subfamilies
- Redlichiinae; Metaredlichiinae; Neoredlichiinae; Pararedlichiinae; Wutingaspinae

= Redlichiidae =

Redlichiidae Temporal range: Cambrian stage 3–Middle Cambrian

Extinct family of trilobites

Redlichiidae is a family of redlichiid trilobites which lived from the Botomian to the Middle Cambrian period. It contains the following genera, divided between five subfamilies:

== Taxonomy ==
=== Redlichiinae ===
- Redlichia (type genus)
- Conoredlichia
- Latiredlichia
- Pteroredlichia
- Syndianella

=== Metaredlichiinae ===
- Metaredlichia (type genus)
- Bornemannaspis
- Breviredlichia
- Iglesiella
- Jingyangia
- Maopingaspis
- Nebidella
- Parazhenbaspis
- Pseudoredlichia
- Sardoredlichia
- Ushbaspis
- Xela
- Zhenbaspis

=== Neoredlichiinae ===
- Neoredlichia (type genus)
- Leptoredlichia
- Olgaspis
- Xenoredlichia

=== Pararedlichiinae ===
- Eoredlichia (type genus)
- Irgitkhemia
- Lemdadella
- Ningqiangaspis
- Pachyredlichia
- Redlichops

=== Wutingaspinae ===
- Wutingaspis (type genus)
- Chaoaspis
- Chengjiangaspis
- Kepingaspis
- Kuanyangia
- Sapushania
- Sardaspis
- Wenganaspis
- Yorkella
