= Redlich–Obersteiner's zone =

The Redlich–Obersteiner's zone, also known as the root entry zone, is a boundary between the central nervous system (CNS) and the peripheral nervous system (PNS). The Redlich–Obersteiner's zone is located at the point of entry of either between cranial nerves and the brain or spinal nerves and the spinal cord. This narrow zone is identified visually where there is a transition regarding myelin production. It is named after Emil Redlich and Heinrich Obersteiner.

As the Redlich–Obersteiner's zone separates the CNS and PNS, there is a transition from Schwann cell myelin to oligodendrocyte myelin. In cranial nerves this is often the place of neuro-vascular compression syndromes such as trigeminal neuralgia.
