= End-Botomian mass extinction =

Two extinction intervals that occurred during Stages 4 and 5 of the Cambrian Period

Apparent extinction intensity, i.e. the fraction of genera going extinct at any given time, as reconstructed from the fossil record. (Graph not meant to include recent epoch of Holocene extinction event)

The end-Botomian mass extinction event, also known as the late early Cambrian extinctions, refer to two extinction intervals that occurred during Stages 4 and 5 of the Cambrian Period, approximately 513 to 509 million years ago. Estimates for the decline in global diversity over these events range from 50% of marine genera up to 80%. Among the organisms affected by this event were the small shelly fossils, archaeocyathids (an extinct group of sponges), trilobites, brachiopods, hyoliths, and mollusks.

== Causes ==
There are several hypotheses for the causes of these extinctions. There is evidence that major changes in the carbon cycle and sea level occurred during this time. Evidence also exists for the development of anoxia (a loss of oxygen) in some environments in the oceans.

One hypothesis that unifies this evidence links these environmental changes to widespread volcanic eruptions caused by the emplacement of the Kalkarindji Large Igneous Province or LIP. These widespread eruptions would have injected large amounts of greenhouse gases into the atmosphere causing warming of the climate and subsequent acidification and loss of oxygen in the oceans. Mercury anomalies have been discovered in strata corresponding to the extinction event; however, such enrichments in mercury are also found in older rocks that predate the biotic crisis. The precise timing between the eruptions and the extinction events remain unresolved.
