= Gustav Albert Schwalbe =

German anatomist and anthropologist (1844–1916)

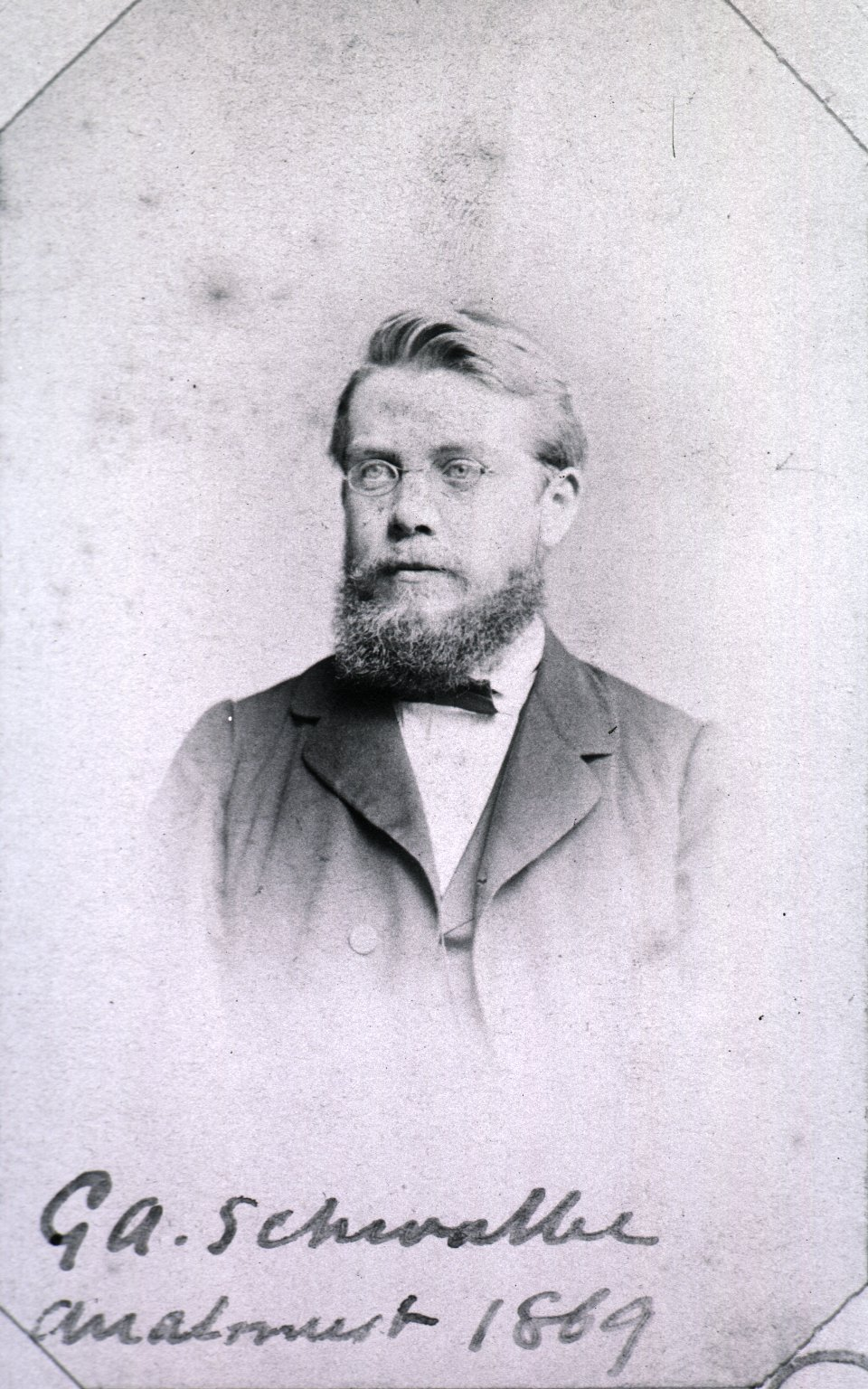
Gustav Schwalbe (1844–1916)

Gustav Albert Schwalbe, M.D. (1 August 1844 – 23 April 1916) was a German anatomist and anthropologist from Quedlinburg.

He was educated at the universities of Berlin, Zurich, and Bonn (M.D. 1866), he became in 1870 privat-docent at the University of Halle, in 1871 privatdozent and prosector at the University of Freiburg in Baden, in 1872 assistant professor at the University of Leipzig, and then professor of anatomy successively at the universities of Jena (1873), Königsberg (1881), and Strassburg (1883) — at that time a German university, Alsace having been annexed to Germany. There he died.

Known for his anthropological research of primitive man, Schwalbe considered the Neanderthal to be a direct ancestor of modern humans. Much to the dismay of the Dutch paleontologist Eugène Dubois (1858–1940) who had discovered Java Man, Schwalbe published in 1899 the influential treatise Studien über Pithecantropus Erectus (Study of Pithecanthropus erectus).

In 1869 Schwalbe injected Berlin-blue dye into the subarachnoid space of a dog, and was the first to demonstrate that the major pathways to absorb cerebrospinal fluid were lymphatic pathways. The subarachnoid or subdural spaces between the internal and external sheaths of the optic nerve are now referred to as "Schwalbe's spaces"; also called the intervaginal spaces of optic nerve (spatia intervaginalia nervi optici). His name is lent to several other anatomical structures, including "Schwalbe's nucleus" or the vestibular nucleus; "Schwalbe's ring", which is a circular ridge consisting of collagenous fibers surrounding the outer margin of Descemet's membrane; and "Schwalbe's line", an anatomical line located on the posterior surface of the eye's cornea. He was the first to describe Paneth cells in the Archiv für mikroskopische Anatomie in 1872; he described them 16 years before Joseph Paneth. Paneth even acknowledged Schwalbe and used one of his drawings in his article that was published in the same journal.

== Literary works ==
- an editor of the Jahresberichte für Anatomie und Entwicklungsgeschichte.
- an editor of the Zeitschrift für Morphologie und Anthropologie.
- He edited also the second edition of Hoffmann's Lehrbuch der Anatomie des Menschen (Erlangen, 1877–81).

and is the author of:

- Lehrbuch der Neurologie (Textbook of neurology) ib. 1881
- Ueber die Kaliberverhältnisse der Nervenfasern, (About caliber conditions of nerve fibers) Leipzig, 1882
- Lehrbuch der Anatomie der Sinnesorgane (Textbook on the anatomy of sensory organs), Erlangen, 1886
- Studien über Pithecantropus Erectus (Study of Pithecanthropus erectus), Leipzig, 1899
- Der Neander Schädel (The Neanderthal skull) ib. 1901
- Vorgeschichte der Menschen (Prehistory of humans) ib. 1903.
