= Ellipsocephaloidea =

Scientific classification
- Kingdom: Animalia
- Phylum: Arthropoda
- Clade: †Artiopoda
- Class: †Trilobita
- Order: †Ptychopariida
- Suborder: †Ptychopariina
- Superfamily: †Ellipsocephaloidea; Lin, 1990

Families
- Agraulidae; Aldonaiidae; Bigotinidae; Chengkouiidae; Ellipsocephalidae; Estaingiidae; Palaeolenidae; Yunnanocephalidae

Extinct superfamily of trilobites

Ellipsocephaloidea is a superfamily of trilobites that lived during the Cambrian period. It was first described by Lin in 1990.

== Taxonomy ==
According to the Fossilworks database, Ellipsocephaloidea belongs to the order Redlichiida and includes several families, such as Agraulidae, Bigotinidae, Ellipsocephalidae, Estaingiidae, Palaeolenidae, and Yunnanocephalidae, although it is now thought the superfamily is within the Ptychopariida.

=== Agraulidae ===
Agraulidae is a family of trilobites within the superfamily Ellipsocephaloidea. Members of this family are characterized by their large size and distinctive cephalic features.

=== Bigotinidae ===
Bigotinidae is another family of trilobites within the superfamily Ellipsocephaloidea. Members of this family are known for their small size and elongated body shape.

=== Ellipsocephalidae ===
Ellipsocephalidae is a family of trilobites within the superfamily Ellipsocephaloidea. Members of this family are characterized by their oval-shaped cephalon and distinctive thoracic segments.

=== Estaingiidae ===
Estaingiidae is a family of trilobites within the superfamily Ellipsocephaloidea. Members of this family are known for their large size and distinctive pygidium.

=== Palaeolenidae ===
Palaeolenidae is a family of trilobites within the superfamily Ellipsocephaloidea. Members of this family are characterized by their small size and distinctive cephalic features.

=== Yunnanocephalidae ===
Yunnanocephalidae is a family of trilobites within the superfamily Ellipsocephaloidea. Members of this family are known for their large size and distinctive thoracic segments.

== Ecology ==
These trilobites were fast-moving low-level epifaunal deposit feeders.
