= Dresbachian =

Maentwrogian regional stage of North America

- 501 – 497 Ma

Usage information
- Celestial body: Earth
- Regional usage: Regional
- Time scale(s) used: North American

Definition
- Chronological unit: Age
- Stratigraphic unit: Stage

The Dresbachian is a Maentwrogian regional stage of North America, lasting from 501 to 497 million years ago. It is part of the Upper Cambrian and is defined by four trilobite zones. It overlaps with the ICS-stages Guzhangian, Paibian and the lowest Jiangshanian.

The Dresbachian overlies the Middle Cambrian Albertan series, and is the lowest stage of the Upper Cambrian Croixian series, followed by the Franconian stage. The Dresbachian extinction event, about 502 million years ago, was followed by the Cambrian–Ordovician extinction event about 486.85 million years ago.

== Naming ==
The term is derived from the town of Dresbach which is located in southeastern Minnesota on the Mississippi River.

== Definition ==
The Dresbachian is defined by four trilobite zones: Cedaria-, Crepicephalus-, Aphelaspis- and Dunderbergia trilobite zones.

== Events ==
The Dresbachian extinction event during the Late Cambrian was the second of two severe extinctions during the first period of the Paleozoic era; the first being the End-Botomian extinction event during the Middle Cambrian. According to data on extinction intensity (see below), both extinction events slashed approximately 40 percent of marine genera. They are poorly documented due to a paucity of fossil evidence so early in the evolution of life.

Intensity of Dresbachian extinction event (right side of graph)
