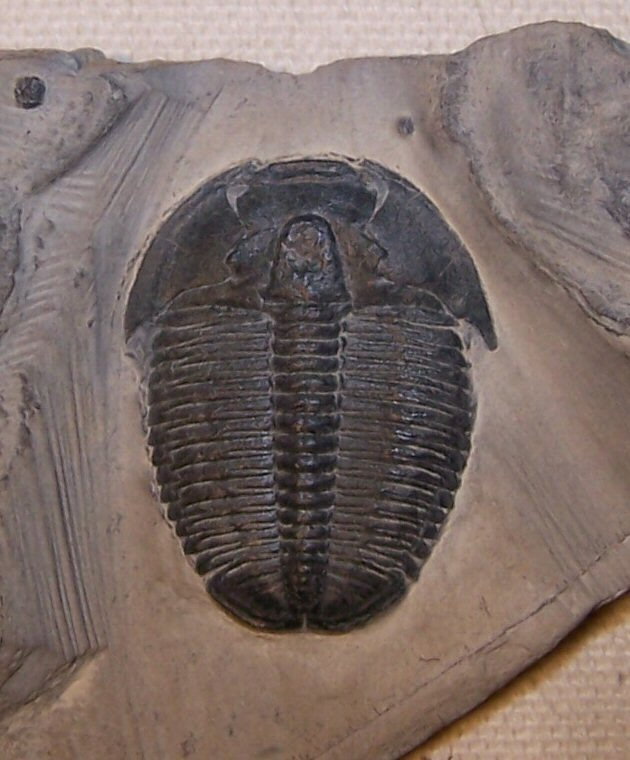
- Elrathia kingii

Scientific classification
- Kingdom: Animalia
- Phylum: Arthropoda
- Clade: †Artiopoda
- Class: †Trilobita
- Subclass: †Librostoma
- Order: †Ptychopariida; Swinnerton, 1915

Suborders
- See text

= Ptychopariida =

Ptychopariida Temporal range: Cambrian Stage 3–Late Ordovician

Extinct order of trilobites

Ptychopariida is a large, heterogeneous order of trilobite containing some of the most primitive species known. The earliest species occurred in the second half of the Lower Cambrian, and the last species did not survive the Ordovician–Silurian extinction event.

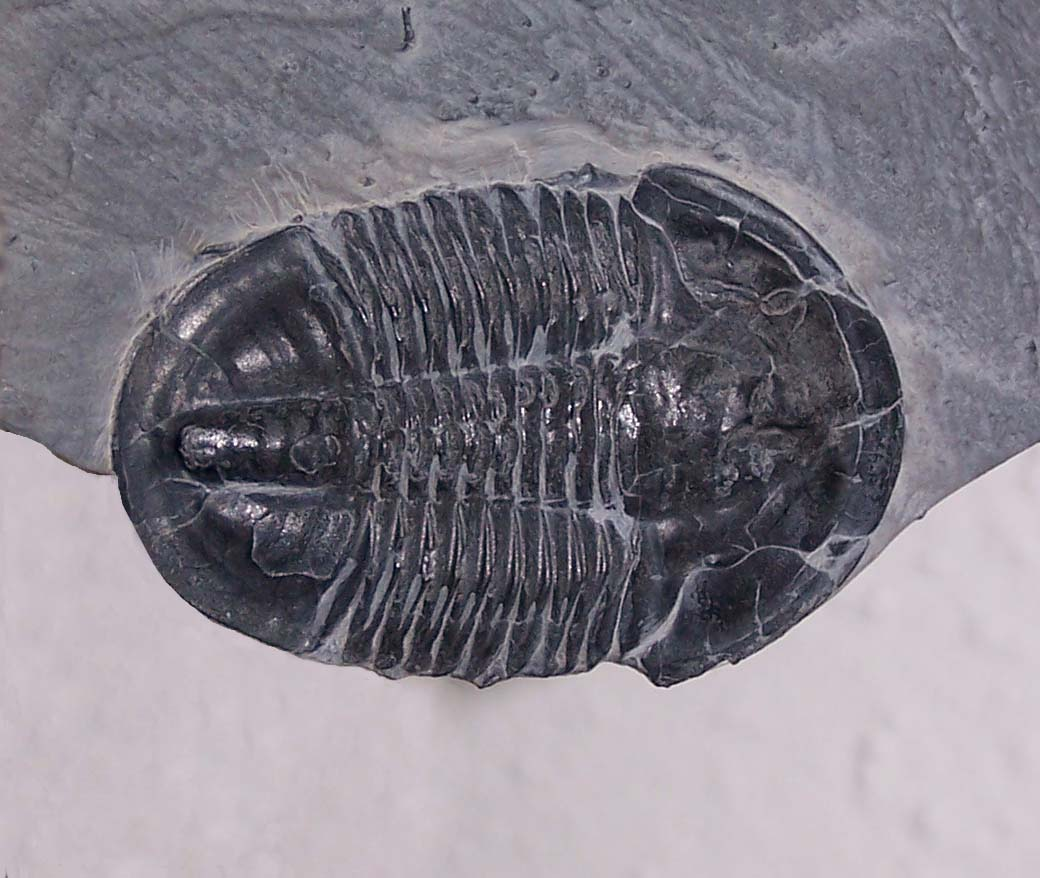
Asaphiscus wheeleri, a Cambrian trilobite of the Superfamily Ptychoparioidea

Trilobites have facial sutures that run along the margin of the glabella and/or fixigena to the shoulder point where the cephalon meets the thorax. These sutures outline the cranidium, or the main, central part of the head that does not include the librigena (free cheeks). The eyes are medial along the glabella on the suture line (and some species have no eyes). The fossils of the moults of trilobites can often be told from the fossils of the actual animals by whether the librigena are present. (The librigena, or cheek spines, detach during moulting.) In ptychopariids, short bladelike genal spines are often present on the tips of the librigena.

The thorax is large and is typically made up of eight or more segments. The thorax is usually much longer than the pygidium, which is usually small. In some species the pygidium is outlined with a flat border.

The Subclass Librostoma was recently erected to encompass several related orders, including Ptychopariida, Asaphida, Proetida, Harpetida, and possibly Phacopida. These are now known as the "Librostome Orders". Trilobites of the orders Proetida, Harpetida, and of the family Damesellidae were originally placed in Ptychopariida.

== Taxonomy ==
Suborder Olenina

- Superfamily Olenoidea
  - Family Ellipsocephaloididae
  - Family Olenidae

Suborder Ptychopariina

- Superfamily Ellipsocephaloidea
  - Family Agraulidae
  - Family Aldonaiidae
  - Family Bigotinidae
  - Family Chengkouiidae
  - Family Ellipsocephalidae
  - Family Estaingiidae
  - Family Palaeolenidae
  - Family Yunnanocephalidae
- Superfamily Ptychoparioidea
  - Family Acrocephalitidae
  - Family Alokistocaridae
  - Family Antagmidae
  - Family Asaphiscidae
  - Family Atopidae
  - Family Bolaspididae
  - Family Cedariidae
  - Family Changshaniidae
  - Family Conocoryphidae
  - Family Conokephalinidae
  - Family Crepicephalidae
  - Family Diceratocephalidae
  - Family Elviniidae
  - Family Eulomidae
  - Family Holocephalinidae
  - Family Ignotogregatidae
  - Family Inouyiidae
  - Family Isocolidae
  - Family Kingstoniidae
  - Family Lisaniidae
  - Family Llanoaspididae
  - Family Lonchocephalidae
  - Family Lorenzellidae
  - Family Mapaniidae
  - Family Marjumiidae
  - Family Menomoniidae
  - Family Nepeidae
  - Family Norwoodiidae
  - Family Papyriaspididae
  - Family Phylacteridae
  - Family Proasaphiscidae
  - Family Ptychopariidae
  - Family Shumardiidae
  - Family Solenopleuridae
  - Family Tricrepicephalidae
  - Family Utiidae
  - Family Wuaniidae
- Superfamily Incertae sedis
  - Genus Tonopahella

Suborder incertae sedis

- Family Avoninidae
- Family Catillicephalidae
- Family Ityophoridae
- Family Plethopeltidae

== See also ==
- Cambroproteus
- Meniscopsia
