= Cambrian Stage 4 =

Stage of the Cambrian period

- ~514.5 – ~506.5 Ma

Chronology
| ← / Orsten Fauna; ← / Dresbachian extinction; ← / Burgess Shale; ← / Kaili biota; ← / Archaeocyatha extinction; ← / Emu Bay Shale; ← / Sirius Passet biota; ← / Chengjiang biota; ← / First Trilobites; ← / SSF diversification, first brachiopods & archaeocyatha; ← / First halkieriids, mollusсs, hyoliths SSF; ← / Baykonurian glaciation |
Major glacial period
Subdivision of the Cambrian according to the ICS, as of 2024. Vertical axis scale: Millions of years ago

Etymology
- Name formality: Informal

Usage information
- Celestial body: Earth
- Regional usage: Global (ICS)
- Time scale(s) used: ICS Time Scale

Definition
- Chronological unit: Age
- Stratigraphic unit: Stage
- Time span formality: Formal
- Lower boundary definition: Not formally defined
- Lower boundary definition candidates: FAD of the Trilobite Olenellus or Redlichia
- Lower boundary GSSP candidate section(s): None
- Lower GSSP ratified: Not formally defined
- Upper boundary definition: FAD of Oryctocephalus indicus.
- Upper boundary GSSP: Wuliu-Zengjiayan, Guizhou, China; 26.0807°N 108.4138°E
- Upper GSSP ratified: June 25, 2018

Cambrian Stage 4 is the still unnamed fourth stage of the Cambrian and the upper stage of Cambrian Series 2. It follows Cambrian Stage 3 and lies below the Wuliuan. The lower boundary has not been formally defined by the International Commission on Stratigraphy. One proposal is the first appearance of two trilobite genera, Olenellus or Redlichia. Another proposal is the first appearance of the trilobite species Arthricocephalus chauveaui. Both proposals will set the lower boundary close to 514.5 million years ago. The upper boundary corresponds to the beginning of the Wuliuan.

== Naming ==
The International Commission on Stratigraphy has not named the fourth stage of the Cambrian yet. In the widely used Siberian nomenclature stage 4 would overlap with parts of the Botomian and Toyonian.

== Biostratigraphy ==
The beginning of Cambrian Stage 4 has been tentatively correlated with the base of the European Leonian faunal stage and the base of the South China Duyunian faunal stage.

During Cambrian Stage 4, three families of trilobites were widely distributed: olenellids, redlichiids, and paradoxidids. At the Stage 4-Wuliuan boundary, the first major trilobite extinction, known as the Olenellid Biomere boundary, occurred. In particular, trilobites of the families Ollenellidae and Redlichiidae have been extinct in Laurentia and South China, respectively.
