= Poleta Formation =

Geological unit located in eastern California and Nevada

- Stratigraphic range: Cambrian Series 2; ~519–518 Ma
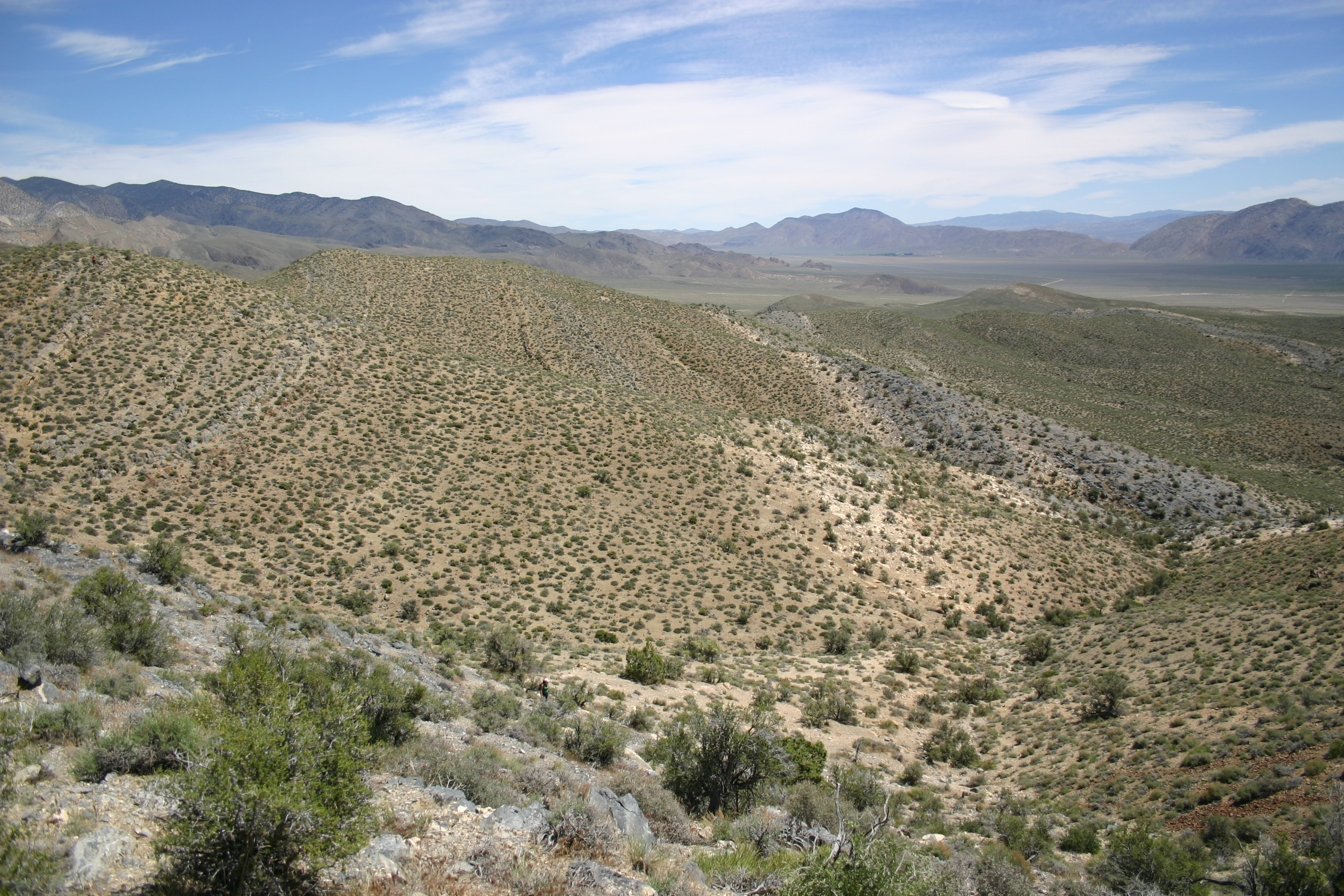
- The Poleta Folds area, the locality after which the formation is named.
- Type: Formation
- Sub-units: See: Members
- Underlies: Harkless Formation
- Overlies: Campito Formation
- Thickness: 0–1,900 ft (0–579 m)

Lithology
- Primary: Fine siliciclastics
- Other: Limestone, Quartzite, Siltstone

Location
- Region: California, Nevada
- Country: United States

Type section
- Named for: Poleta Folds

The Poleta Formation is a geological unit known for the exceptional fossil preservation in the Indian Springs Lagerstätte, located in eastern California and Nevada.

== Occurrence ==
The formation dates to the Stage 3 of the yet-to-be-ratified Cambrian Series 2; the lower portion base of the formation and the youngest Lagerstätte beds date to the Stage 3 Nevadella trilobite zone (= Laurentian Montezuman stage), with higher beds dating to the Stage 4 Olenellus trilobite zone (= Laurentian Dyeran stage), making the formation the same age as the Sirius Passet and just younger than the Chengjiang. It outcrops in Esmeralda County in western Nevada.

== Geology ==
The Poleta Formation is mainly composed of limestone rocks within its lower and upper sections, with its middle section containing siltstone, quartzite, and some limestone. It is overlain by the Harkless Formation, whilst it is underlain by the Campito Formation.

=== Members ===
The formation contains three members, which are as follows, in ascending stratigraphic order (lowest to highest):

- Lower Member: This member is the thickest of the three, getting up to 1,000 ft (300 m) thick. It is primarily composed of medium to light-gray oolitic limestone, containing an abundance of archeocyathid reefs. The limestone is mostly well-bedded, although it is occasionally thin to very thin-bedded. There is also a single inter-stratified layer of greenish-gray or olive-gray siltstone, getting up to 100 ft (30 m) thick.
- Middle Member: This member in some areas gets up to 600 ft (180 m) thick. It is dominated by siltstones, limestones, and sandstones or quartzites. The siltstone layers are made up of grayish-olive, pale-olive, and locally pale-yellowish-brown or light-brown siltstone, shale, and phylitic silstone, which are composed of subangular silt-sized grains of quartz, embedded in a fine-textured matrix of muscovite or mica clay, and chlorite. The limestone layers are composed of medium-gray to grayish-orange or mottled-gray to light-brown aphanitic to medium crystalline limestone, which is inter-stratified with occasional siltstone. The sandstone or quartzite layers are primarily pale-brown, light-brown and very-pale-orange, very fine to fine grained and commonly evenly laminated. In some areas, these layers can grade into a coarse siltstone. They also contain quartz and feldspars.
- Upper Member: This member is the thinnest, only getting up to 100 ft (30 m) thick. It is mostly composed of medium-gray limestone, which is very thin to thin-bedded. It also contains a few archaeocyathid fossils.

== Depositional setting ==
The formation was deposited on an offshore shelf between the wave base and storm base, and experienced storm-related pulses of siliciclastic sediment input. Like many other Burgess Shale-type Lagerstätten, this unit was deposited on the Cordilleran margin of the Laurentian continent; it is among the oldest of the Lagerstätten from this region.

== Taphonomy ==
The modes of preservation of the non-biomineralised material found within the Indian Springs Lagerstätte has been noted to be either clay-mineral replacement, and pyrite or iron oxide staining. This is similar to the modes of preservation seen in the Chengjiang Lagerstätte. The Lagerstätte is also an example of a obrution-type deposition, which is a rapid burial of organisms, with some helicoplacoids being buried alive, still in their upright position. This form of deposition will have also obscured the buried specimens from scavengers.

== Paleobiota ==
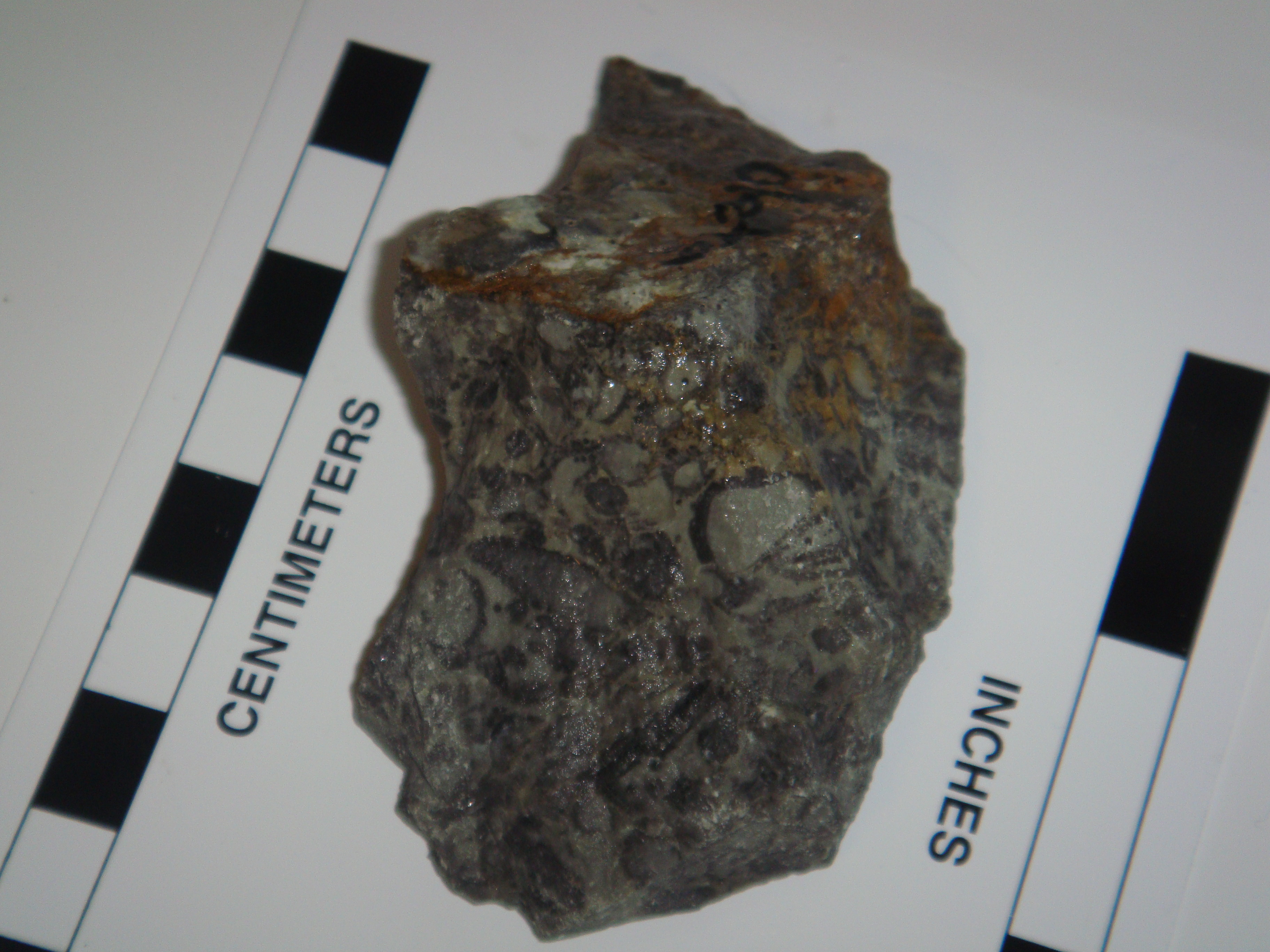
Archeocyathids from the Death Valley area

Most of the fauna is biomineralized, including brachiopods, hyolithids, trilobites, archeocyathids from the Gold Point Reef locality, and helicoplacoids, which are often articulated. Non-mineralized components of these fossils are also preserved, as are sponges, anomalocaridid parts, and a range of algae and cyanobacteria.

Trace fossils, mainly Planolites, are also common; ichnofossils generally lie on the bedding plane and very few penetrate more than 1 millimetre (0.039 in) into the sediment. The biota of this formation has been noted to be similar to the Utah Lagerstätten, more so to the Spence Shale.

Color key
Taxon	Reclassified taxon	Taxon falsely reported as present	Dubious taxon or junior synonym	Ichnotaxon	Ootaxon	Morphotaxon

Notes
Uncertain or tentative taxa are in small text; ~~crossed out~~ taxa are discredited.

=== Arthropoda ===
Genus	Species	Notes	Images
Mesonacis	M. fremonti	Olenellid trilobite, originally described as Fremonita.	
Laudonia	Laudonia sp.	Olenellid trilobite.	
Olenellus	O. clarki	Olenellid trilobite.	
Elliptocephala	E. praenuntius	Olenellid trilobite.	
Teresellus	Teresellus sp.; T. goldfieldensis	Olenellid rilobite.	
Nevadella	N. eucharis	Nevadid trilobite.	
Nevadia	N. parvoconica	Nevadid trilobite.	
Judomia (?)	Judomia (?) sp.	Nevadid trilobite.	
Holmiella	H. falx	Holmiid trilobite.	
Holmia	Holmia sp.	Holmiid trilobite.	
Palmettaspis	P. consorta; P. lidensis	Holmiid trilobite.	
Grandinasus	Grandinasus sp.; G. argentus; G. auricampus	Holmiid trilobite.	
Holmidd (?)	???	Undetermined holmiid trilobite.	
Keeleaspis (?)	K. (?) terhaari	Corynexochid trilobite.	
Polliaxis	P. hanseni	Corynexochid trilobite.	
Geraldinella	Geraldinella sp.	Fallotaspidoid trilobite.	
Anomalocarididae	???	Anomalocaridid sclerites and fragments.	

=== Lophotrochozoa ===
Genus	Species	Notes	Images
Microcornus	Microcornus sp.	Lophotrochozoan hyolith.	
Hyolithellus (?)	Hyolithellus (?) sp.	Lophotrochozoan hyolith.	
Obolella	Obolellasp.	Obelellid brachiopod.	
Kutorgina	K. perugata	Kutorginid brachiopod.	
Lingulella	Lingulella spp.	Obolid brachiopod.	
Spinulothele	S. dubia	Acrotheloid brachiopod.	
Pompeckium (?)	P. argenteum (?)	Eoorthid brachiopod.	
Mickwitzia	M. occidens	Mickwitziid brachiopod.	
Swantonia	S. weeksi	Brachiopod of uncertain affinities.	
Lingulid	???	Lingulid brachiopod.	
Obollelid	???	Obollelid brachiopod, muscle scars preserved.	
Hyolithes	H. princeps	Lophotrochozoan hyolith.	
Hyolithellus	Hyolithellus (?) sp.; H. insolitus	Lophotrochozoan hyolith.	
Hyolithid	???	Lophotrochozoan hyolithids, too poorly preserved for taxonomic placement.	
Orthothecida	???	Orthothecid hyoliths, too poorly preserved for taxonomic placement.	
Lapworthella (?)	Lapworthella (?) sp.	Lophotrochozoan tommotid.	

=== Chancelloriidae ===
Genus	Species	Notes	Images
Allonia	Allonia sp.	Chancelloriid organism.	
Chancelloria	Chancelloria sp.	Chancelloriid organism.	
Chancelloriid	???	Chancelloriid spicules.	

=== Cnidaria ===
Genus	Species	Notes	Images
Paiutitubulites	P. variabilis; P. durhami	Anthozoan cnidarian.	
Cambrotubulites	Cambrotubulites sp.; C. trisepta	Anthozoan cnidarian.	
Sphenothallus	Sphenothallus sp.	Cnidarian conulariid.	
Genus A	Genus A sp.	Anthozoan cnidarian, similar interior to Cambrotubulites and Paiutitubulites, though differs in having five septa.	

=== Porifera (Sponges) ===
Genus	Species	Notes	Images
Archaeocyathus	A. arborensis	Archeocyathid sponge.	
Claruscoscinus	Claruscoscinus sp.	Archeocyathid sponge.	
Protopharetra	P. junensis	Archeocyathid sponge.	
Gatagacyathus	Gatagacyathus sp.	Archeocyathid sponge.	
Ethmophyllum	E. whitneyi	Archeocyathid sponge.	
Williamicyathus	W. colvillensis	Archeocyathid sponge.	
Robustocyathellus	Robustocyathellus sp.	Archeocyathid sponge.	
Paranacyathus	Paranacyathus sp.	Archeocyathid sponge.	
Protopharetra	Protopharetra sp.	Archeocyathid sponge.	
Metacyathellus (?)	Metacyathellus (?) sp.	Archeocyathid sponge.	
Cordilleracyathus (?)	Cordilleracyathus (?) sp.	Archeocyathid sponge.	
Wapkia (?)	Wapkia (?) sp.	Wapkiid demosponge.	

=== Echniodermata ===
Genus	Species	Notes	Images
Helicoplacus	Helicoplacus sp.; H. gilberti	Oblong echinoderm.	
Eocystites	Eocystites sp.	Echinoderm.	

=== Foraminifera ===
Genus	Species	Notes	Images
Platysolenites	P. antiquissimus	Agglutinated hyperamminid foraminiferan.	
Problematicum A	???	Platysolenites-like tubular test, may be a taphonomic variant of Platysolenites. Also shows a resemblance to Spirosolenites spiralis, Although it differs to much in other ways when compared to Platysolenites and Spirosolenites.	

=== Petalonamae ===
Genus	Species	Notes	Images
Swartpuntia	Swartpuntia sp.	Sessile frondose organism, although assignment has been questioned based on the possibility that known specimens could be referred to other known Cambrian frondose organisms.	

=== incertae sedis ===
Genus	Species	Notes	Images
Onuphionella	O. claytonensis	Tubular fossil.	
Salterella	Salterella sp.	Tubular salterellid fossil.	
Westgardia	W. gigantea	Valve-shaped fossil. Noted to be a mold of the shell, and poor preservation hinders taxonomic placement, although general morphology suggests it to be a mollusc.	

=== Flora ===
Genus	Species	Notes	Images
Cyanobacteria (?)	???	Calcareous cyanobacteria.	
Renalcis	Renalcis sp.	Cyanophyte cyanobacteria.	

=== Ichnogenera ===
Genus	Species	Notes	Images
Cruziana	Cruziana sp.	Trails.	
Planolites	Planolites sp.	Burrows.	
Scolicia	Scolicia sp.	Burrows.	
Rusophycus	Rusophycus sp.	Resting trace of trilobites.	
Bergaueria	Bergaueria sp.	Resting trace of cnidarians.	
Laevicyclus	Laevicyclus sp.	Traces.	
Psammichnites (?)	Psammichnites (?) sp.	Burrows.	
Monocraterion	Monocraterion sp.	Burrows.	
Skolithos	Skolithos sp.	Burrows.	

== See also ==
- List of fossiliferous stratigraphic units in Nevada
- Paleontology in Nevada
