= Campito Formation =

Geologic formation in Nevada, United States

- Stratigraphic range: Lower Cambrian
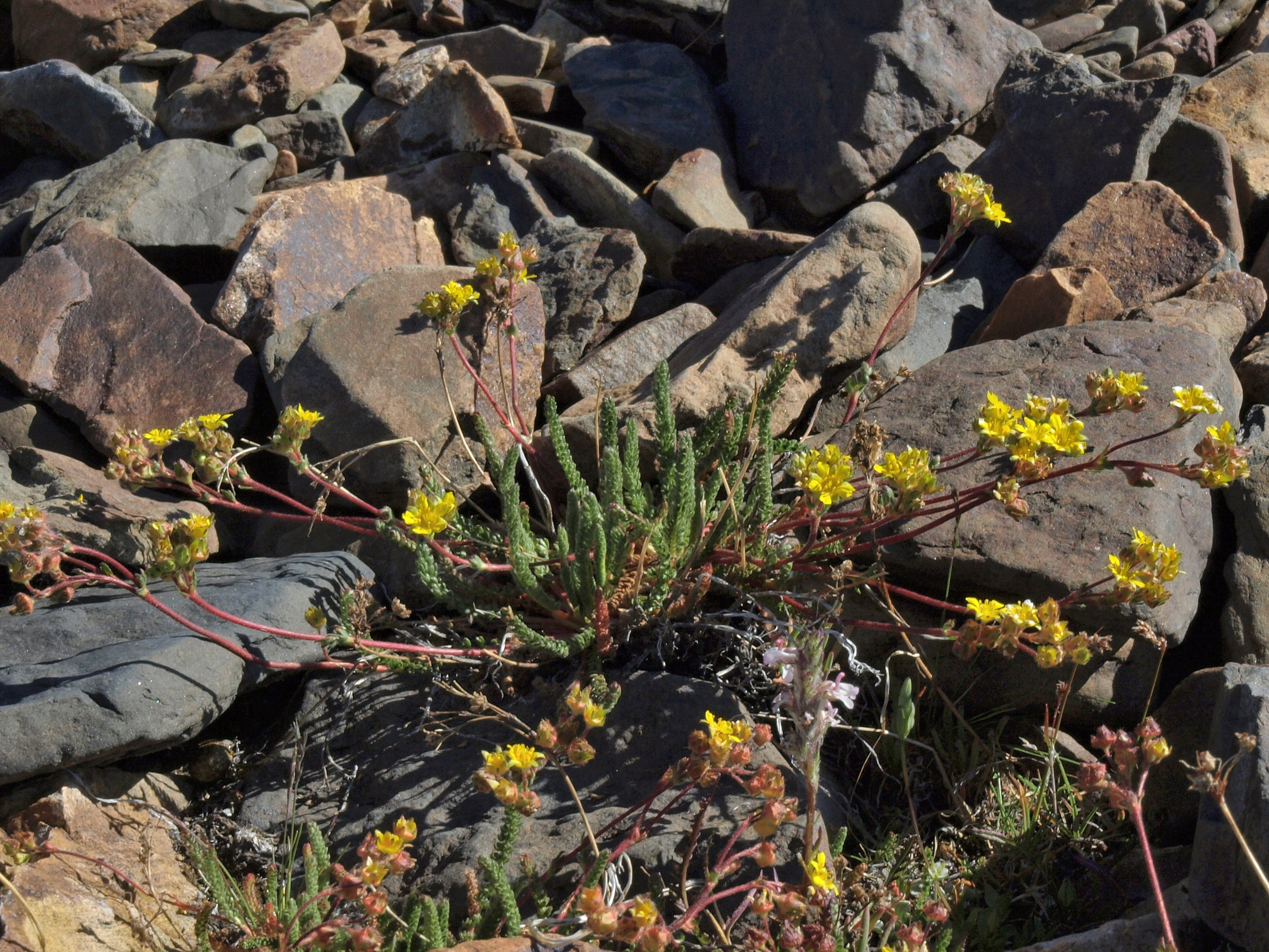
- White Mountains mousetails, growing on substrate within the Campito Formation
- Type: Formation
- Sub-units: See: Members
- Underlies: Poleta Formation
- Overlies: Deep Spring Formation
- Thickness: 0–3,500 ft (0–1,067 m)

Lithology
- Primary: Quartzite
- Other: Siltstone, Sandstone

Location
- Region: California, Nevada
- Country: United States

The Campito Formation is a geologic formation in the Last Chance Range, California, and Esmeralda County, Nevada. It preserves fossils dating back to the Cambrian period.

== Geology ==
The Campito Formation is mainly composed of very fine to fine-grained quartzite, with small amounts of siltstone, getting up to 3,500 ft (1,100 m) thick. It is overlain by the Poleta Formation, whilst it is underlain by the Deep Spring Formation.

=== Members ===
The formation is split into two distinct members, which are as follows, in ascending stratigraphic order (lowest to highest):

- Andrews Mountain Member: It is the thickest of the two members, getting up to 2,800 ft (850 m) thick. It is composed of olive-gray or greenish-gray very fine to fine grained silty quartzitic sandstone or quartzite and interbedded layers of dark-greenish-gray siltstones, which weather to a greenish-black or just black. The quartzite layers are composed of sub-angular very fine to fine grains of quartz, feldspar and other metallic minerals, all set within a muscovite, chlorite, and biotite.
- Montenegro Member: It is the thinnest of the two members, only getting up to 1,000 ft (300 m) thick. It is composed of dark-greenish-gray and greenish-gray siltstone composed of a mixture of quartz, muscovite, and chlorite. The siltstone is evenly laminated to thin-bedded. There are also commonly occurring archeocyathid-bearing limestone beds in the upper sections of the member.

== Paleobiota ==
The Campito Formation contains a number of fossils, most of which are found within the Montenegro Member. They range from archeocyathid sponges like Ethmophyllum, to arthropod trilobites like Nevadia, and a wealth of ichnogenera, from burrows like Skolithos, to resting traces like Rusophycus.

Color key: Taxon / Reclassified taxon / Taxon falsely reported as present / Dubious taxon or junior synonym / Ichnotaxon / Ootaxon / Morphotaxon	Notes; Uncertain or tentative taxa are in small text; ~~crossed out~~ taxa are discredited.

=== Arthropoda ===
Genus	Species	Notes	Images
Fritzaspis	Fritzaspis sp.; F. generalis; F. ovalis	Fallotaspidoid trilobite.	
Amplifallotaspis	A. keni	Fallotaspidoid trilobite.	
Profallotaspis (?)	Profallotaspis (?) sp.	Fallotaspidoid trilobite.	
Archaeaspis	A. nelsoni; A. macropleuron	Fallotaspidoid trilobite.	
Cirquella	C. nelsoni	Fallotaspidoid trilobite.	
Cambroinyoella	C. wallacei	Fallotaspidoid trilobite.	
Fallotaspis	Fallotaspis sp.; F. longa	Fallotaspidoid trilobite.	
Daguinaspis	Daguinaspis sp.	Fallotaspidoid trilobite.	
Repinaella	Repinaella sp.	Fallotaspidoid trilobite.	
Eofallotaspis	Eofallotaspis sp.	Fallotaspidoid trilobite.	
Nevadia	Nevadia sp.	Nevadiid trilobite.	
Judomia (?)	Judomia (?) sp.	Nevadiid trilobite, assignment to genus is very tentative.	
Montezumaspis	M. parallela; M. cometes	Holmiid trilobite.	
Esmeraldina	E. rowei; E. elliptica; E. cometes (?)	Holmiid trilobite. E. cometes was previously identified as Fallotaspis tazemmourtensis.	
Holmiella	Holmiella sp.; H. millerensis	Holmiid trilobite.	
Palmettaspis	P. consorta; P. lidensis	Holmiid trilobite.	
Grandinasus	G. auricampus; G. patulus	Holmiid trilobite.	

=== Lobopodia ===
Genus	Species	Notes	Images
Microdictyon	Microdictyon sp.	Xenusid lopopod.	

=== Lophotrochozoa ===
Genus	Species	Notes	Images
Microcornus	Microcornus sp.	Lophotrochozoan hyolith.	
Ladatheca	Ladatheca sp.	Lophotrochozoan hyolith.	
Parkula	Parkula sp.	Lophotrochozoan hyolith.	
Hyolithellus (?)	Hyolithellus (?) sp.	Lophotrochozoan hyolith.	
Obolella	O. excelsis	Obelellid brachiopod.	
Pelagiella	P. subangulata	Pelagiellid mollusc.	
Nisusia (?)	Nisusia (?)sp.	Kutorginid brachiopod.	
Sabellidites (?)	Sabellidites (?) sp.	Tubular fossil.	
Brachiopod indet.	???	Indeterminate brachiopod, most likely an internal mold, possibly a poorly preserved Nisusia (?)sp. specimen, or another kutorginid brachiopod.	
Obelellid molds	???	Molds of obelellid brachiopods.	

=== Chancelloriidae ===
Genus	Species	Notes	Images
Allonia	Allonia sp.	Chancelloriid organism.	
Chancelloria	Chancelloria sp.	Chancelloriid organism.	

=== Cnidaria ===
Genus	Species	Notes	Images
Paiutitubulites	P. variabilis	Anthozoan cnidarian.	

=== Porifera (Sponges) ===
Genus	Species	Notes	Images
Ethmophyllum (?)	Ethmophyllum (?) sp.	Archeocyathid sponge.	

=== Echniodermata ===
Genus	Species	Notes	Images
Helicoplacus	Helicoplacus sp.	Oblong echinoderm.	
Isolated plates	Eocrinoidea (?)	Isolated plates, possibly of eocrinoid origin.	

=== Foraminifera ===
Genus	Species	Notes	Images
Platysolenites	P. antiquissimus	Agglutinated hyperamminid foraminiferan.	

=== incertae sedis ===
Genus	Species	Notes	Images
Onuphionella	O. durhami	Tubular fossil.	
Volborthella	V. titanius	Tubular fossil, originally described as Campitius.	

=== Ichnogenera ===
Genus	Species	Notes	Images
Cruziana	Cruziana sp.	Trails.	
Planolites	Planolites sp.	Burrows.	
Helminthopsis	Helminthopsis sp.	Feeding trails.	
Belorhaphe	Belorhaphe sp.	Burrows.	
Cochlichnus	Cochlichnus sp.	Burrows.	
Scolicia	Scolicia sp.	Burrows.	
Rusophycus	R. didymus; R. radwanskii	Resting trace of trilobites.	
Bergaueria	Bergaueria sp.	Resting trace of cnidarians.	
Zoophycus	Zoophycus sp.	Polychaete feeding traces.	
Arthrophycus	Arthrophycus sp.	Polychaete trace.	
Teichichnus	Teichichnus sp.	Feeding trace.	
Treptichnus	Treptichnus sp.	Burrow, originally described as Phycodes.	
Diplichnites	Diplichnites sp.	Arthropod trackways.	
Skolithos	Skolithos sp.	Burrows.	

== See also ==
- List of fossiliferous stratigraphic units in Nevada
- Paleontology in Nevada
