= Sparagmite Formation =

Geologic Formation in Norway

- Stratigraphic range: Cambrian Stage 3; ~520–516 Ma
- Type: Formation

Lithology
- Primary: Shale
- Other: Sandstone

Location
- Coordinates: 60.9°N 10.7°E
- Approximate paleocoordinates: 40.3°S 24.1°W
- Country: Norway
- Sparagmite Formation (Norway)

The Sparagmite Formation is a geologic formation in Norway. It preserves fossils dating back to the Cambrian period.

== Fossil content ==
The formation has provided several fossils:

- Acrothele bellapunctata
- Ellipsocephalus nordenskjoldi
- Helcionella subrugosa
- Holmia grandis, H. kjerulfi
- Kjerulfia lata
- Marocella antiqua, M. depressa
- Obolella rotundata, Obolella (Glyptias) favosa
- Runcinodiscus cf. index
- Strenuella linnarssoni, S. primaeva
- Torellella laevigata
- Volborthella tenuis
- Hyolithes sp.
- ?Lingulella sp.

== See also ==
- List of fossiliferous stratigraphic units in Norway
