= Deep Spring Formation =

Geologic formation in Nevada, United States

- Stratigraphic range: Ediacaran – Cambrian 540–527 Ma
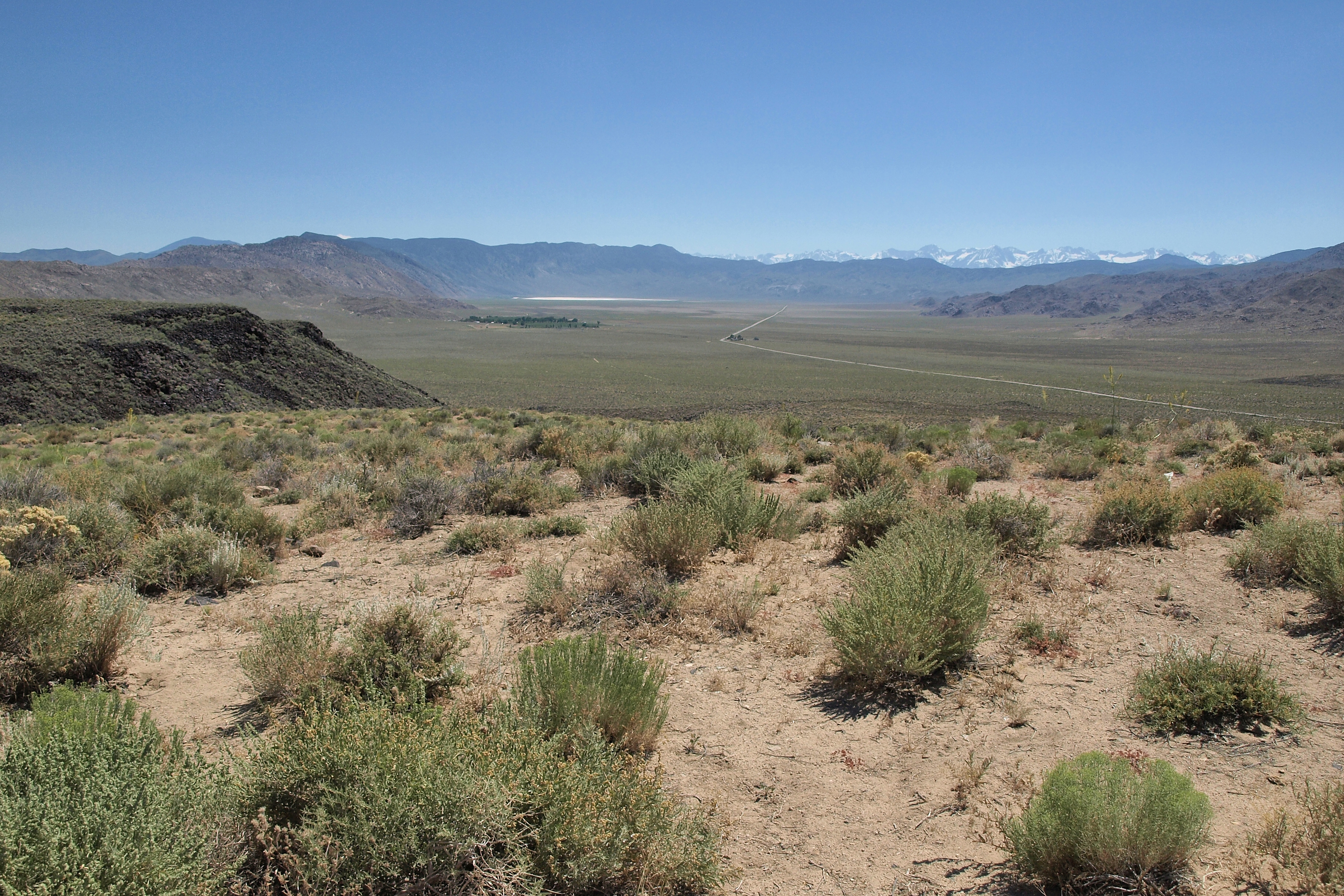
- Deep Springs Valley, the locality after which the formation is named.
- Type: Geological Formation
- Sub-units: Dunfee, Esmeralda and Gold Point Members
- Underlies: Campito Formation
- Overlies: Reed Dolomite
- Thickness: 549 m (1800 ft)

Lithology
- Primary: Limestone
- Other: Quartzite, Siltstone

Location
- Region: Nevada
- Country: United States

Type section
- Named for: Deep Springs Valley

The Deep Spring Formation is a geologic formation in Nevada. It preserves fossils dating back to the Ediacaran and Cambrian periods, like Wutubus and Elainabella. It is also one of the only known Ediacaran Lagerstätten in the Southwestern United States.

== Geology ==
The Deep Spring Formation is mainly composed of siltstone, sandstone, limyor dolomitic sandstones, quartzite, sandy limestones and dolomite. It is overlain by the Campito Formation, whilst it is underlain by the Reed Dolomite.

=== Members ===
The Deep Spring Formation is composed of three members, which are as follows, in ascending stratigraphic order (lowest to highest):

- Dunfee Member: This member is the thickest, getting up to 670 ft (200 m) thick, and is composed of medium-gray or grayish-orange fine crystalline and very thin bedded limestone. Some layers of limestone contain fine grains of quartz, and small irregular carbonate pellets about a quarter of an inch in diameter. There are also light-gray, medium-gray or very-pale-orange fine to coarse crystalline and laminated to thick-bedded dolomite, which occur at the base and top of the member.
- Esmeralda Member: This member can get up to 600 ft (180 m) thick, and consists primarily yellowish-gray, pale-yellowish-brown, and very-light-gray very fine to fine grained, and evenly laminated to rarely cross-stratified quartzite and calcareous sandstone. There are medium-gray very fine crystalline to fine crystalline limestone, some of which is oolitic. Within some parts of the member, there are also greenish-gray, olive-gray, and very pale orange siltstone, as well as very-pale-orange very fine crystalline to medium crystalline dolomite.
- Gold Point Member: This member is the thinnest, getting up to 350 ft (110 m) thick, and is primarily composed of grayish-olive, greenish-gray, and medium-gray siltstone and very fine grained silty quartzite in the lower parts of this member, whilst in the upper parts of the member has medium-gray fine crystalline dolomite, with occasional limestones.

== Paleobiota ==
The first organism to be described from the Deep Spring Formation in 2014 was Elainabella in the Esmeralda Member, an enigmatic alga with similarities to green algae, suggesting that part of the formation was at one point a shallow marine environment or a microbial reef community. From there, more organisms would be described and named from this formation, most of which are ichnogenera like Planolites, alongside some hyoliths within Cambrian sections, and even a myriad of tubular forms within the Ediacaran sections, like Wutubus and Saarina, expanding not only the stratigraphic range of some of these forms, but also their biogeographic range.

All organisms listed here are from the Ediacaran sections of the formation, unless stated otherwise.

Color key: Taxon / Reclassified taxon / Taxon falsely reported as present / Dubious taxon or junior synonym / Ichnotaxon / Ootaxon / Morphotaxon

Notes
Uncertain or tentative taxa are in small text
~~crossed out~~ taxa are discredited.

=== Lophotrochozoa ===
| Genus | Species | Notes | Images |
|---|---|---|---|
| Salanytheca | Salanytheca sp. | Orthothecid hyolith, from the Cambrian section of the formation. | |
| Spinulitheca | S. billingsi | Hyolith lophotrochozoan, from the Cambrian section of the formation. | |

=== incertae sedis ===
| Genus | Species | Notes | Images |
|---|---|---|---|
| Cloudina | C. hartmannae | Worm-like organism. | |
| Costatubus | C. bibendi | Tubular fossil, first occurrence in this formation and new species. Previously reported as Conotubus. | |
| Coleoloides | C. inyoensis | Tubular fossil. | |
| Gaojiashania | Gaojiashania sp. | Worm-like organism. | |
| Saarina | S. hagadorni | Tubular fossil, first occurrence in this formation and new species. | |
| Sinotubulites | S. cienegensis | Tubular fossil, originally reported as S. cienegensis. | |
| Wutubus | W. annularis | Tubular fossil. | |
| Wyattia (?) | W. reedensis (?) | Mollusc-like fossil. May by synonymous with Cloudina, though this is tenuous at best. | |
| Vendotaenia | Vendotaenia sp. | Ribbon-like organism. | |

=== Flora ===
| Genus | Species | Notes | Images |
|---|---|---|---|
| Elainabella | E. deepspringensis | Enigmatic filamentous multicellular alga. | |
| Stromatolites | Stromatolites | Cyanobacteria layered formation. | |

=== Ichnogenera ===
Ichnogenera
| Genus | Species | Notes | Images |
|---|---|---|---|
| Bergaueria | Bergaueria sp. | Resting place of Cnidarians. | |
| Neonereites (?) | Neonereites (?) sp. | Burrows. | |
| Planolites | Planolites sp. | Burrows. | |
| Scolicia (?) | Scolicia sp. | Burrows. | |
| Rusophycus | Rusophycus sp. | Resting traces. | |
| Cruziana | Cruziana sp. | Movement traces. | |
| Treptichnus | T. pedum | Burrows. | |
| Helminthoidichnites | Helminthoidichnites sp. | Burrows. | |
| Helminthopsis | Helminthopsis sp. | Feeding trails. | |
| Cochlichnus | Cochlichnus sp. | Burrows. | |
| Belorhaphe | Belorhaphe sp. | Burrows. | |
| Helicolithus | Helicolithus sp. | Burrows. | |
| Diplichnites | Diplichnites sp. | Arthropod trackways. | |
| Skolithos | Skolithos sp. | Burrows. | |
| Monocraterion | Monocraterion sp. | Burrows. | |
| Monomorphichnus | M. multilineatus | Trilobite feeding traces. | |
| Astropolithon (?) | Astropolithon (?) sp. | Sea star burrows. | |

== See also ==
- List of fossiliferous stratigraphic units in Nevada
- Paleontology in Nevada
