= Kent Plateau =

Mountain in Ross Dependency, Antarctica

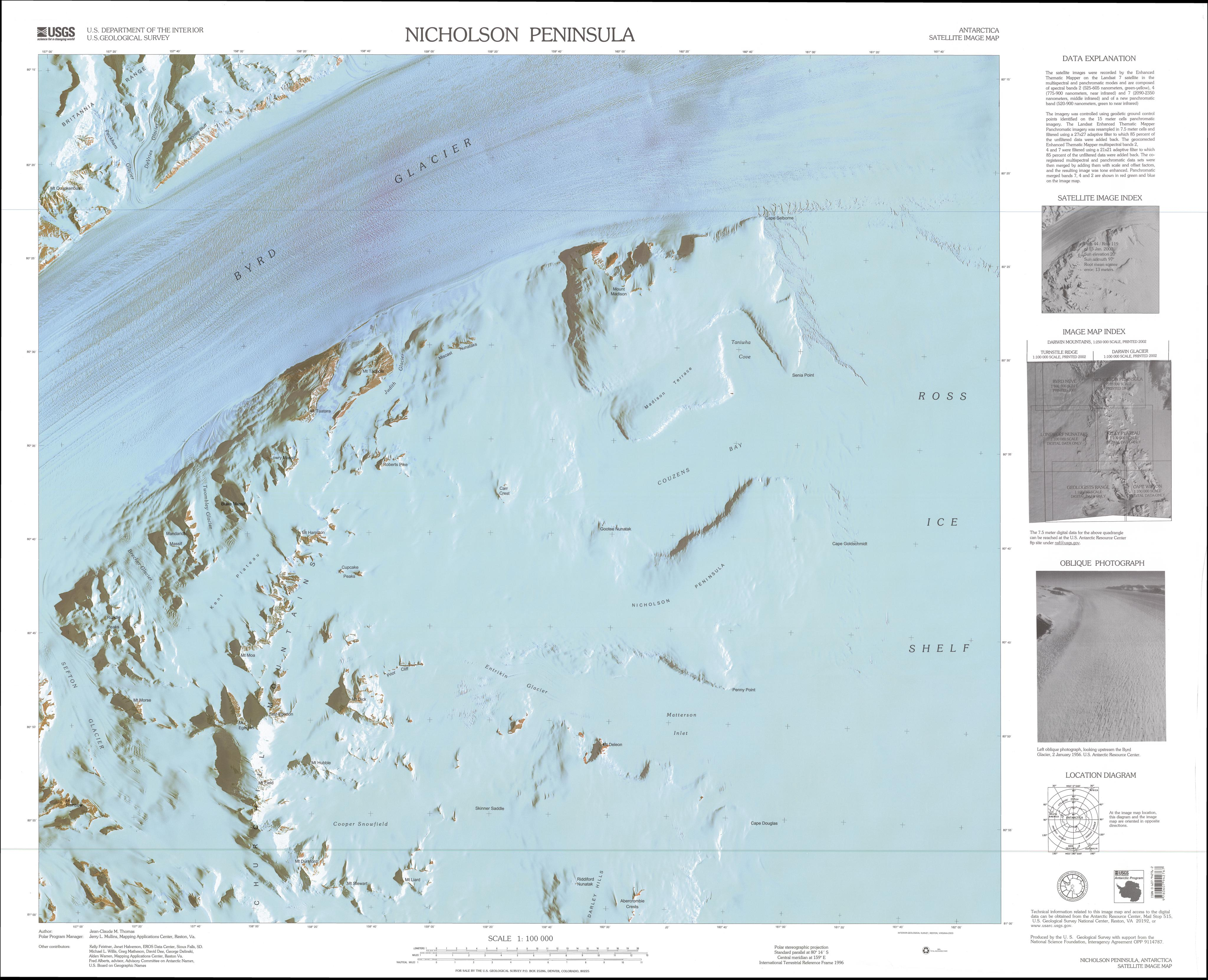
- Satellite Image Map of Nicholson Peninsula and surroundings. Byrd Glacier to the northeast. Kent Plateau center west.

Highest point
- Coordinates: 80°44′S 157°50′E

Geography
- Location within Antarctica
- Location: Antarctica
- Region: Ross Dependency
- Parent range: Churchill Mountains

The Kent Plateau (80°44′S 157°50′E) is an ice-covered plateau in the northern extreme of the Churchill Mountains of Antarctica.

== Name ==
Kent Plateau was named by the Advisory Committee on Antarctic Names for Commander Donald F. Kent, U.S. Navy, logistics officer to Admiral Dufek at the outset of U.S. Navy Operation Deep Freeze I, 1955–56.

== Location ==
The Kent Plateau is an ice-covered plateau, 12 miles (19 km) long and 4 miles (6.4 km) wide, extending northward from Mount Egerton and Kiwi Pass to the vicinity of Mount Hamilton. The plateau is on the west of a ridge of mountains that runs north from Mount Durnford, dips at Kiwi Pass, then continues north from Mount Moa to Mount Hamilton along the east edge of the plateau. To the west of the plateau along the southeast edge of the Byrd Glacier there is a chain of mountains broken by glaciers that flow down from the plateau region to Byrd Glacier.

== Glaciers ==
Several short glaciers run down from the plateau into Byrd Glacier. From southwest to northeast they are:

=== Zeller Glacier ===
80°55′S 156°30′E. A glacier about 10 miles (16 km) long, flowing west-north-west to enter the south side of Byrd Glacier just north of Mount Fries. Named by US-ACAN for Edward J. Zeller, geologist at McMurdo Station, 1959–60 and 1960-61 seasons.

=== Sefton Glacier ===
80°45′S 156°52′E. Glacier about 10 miles (16 km) long, flowing into the south side of Byrd Glacier just west of Rundle Peaks. Named by the US-ACAN for Ronald Sefton, ionospheric physicist, a member of the Byrd Station winter parties of 1962 and 1964.

=== Twombley Glacier ===
80°35′S 157°45′E A glacier 6 miles (9.7 km) long, flowing from the north side of the Kent Plateau into the south side of Byrd Glacier. Named by US-ACAN for C.E. Twombley of the U.S. Weather Bureau, a member of the Little America V winter party, 1956.

=== Brecher Glacier ===
80°42′S 157°28′E. A broad glacier 5 nautical miles (9 km) long in the north Churchill Mountains that flows north between the Rundle Peaks and Mandarich Massif into Byrd Glacier. It was named after Henry H. Brecher of the Byrd Polar Research Center, Ohio State University; he conducted Antarctic glaciological investigations for over 30 years, 1960–95, including determinations of surface velocities and elevations on Byrd Glacier.

=== Judith Glacier ===
80°29′S 158°49′E. Glacier about 9 miles (14 km) long, flowing from the vicinity of Mount Hamilton northeastward to enter Byrd Glacier just east of Mount Tuatara. Named by US-ACAN for Cdr. J.H. Judith, USN, commanding officer of the Edisto during USN OpDFrz 1964.

== Nearby features to the east ==
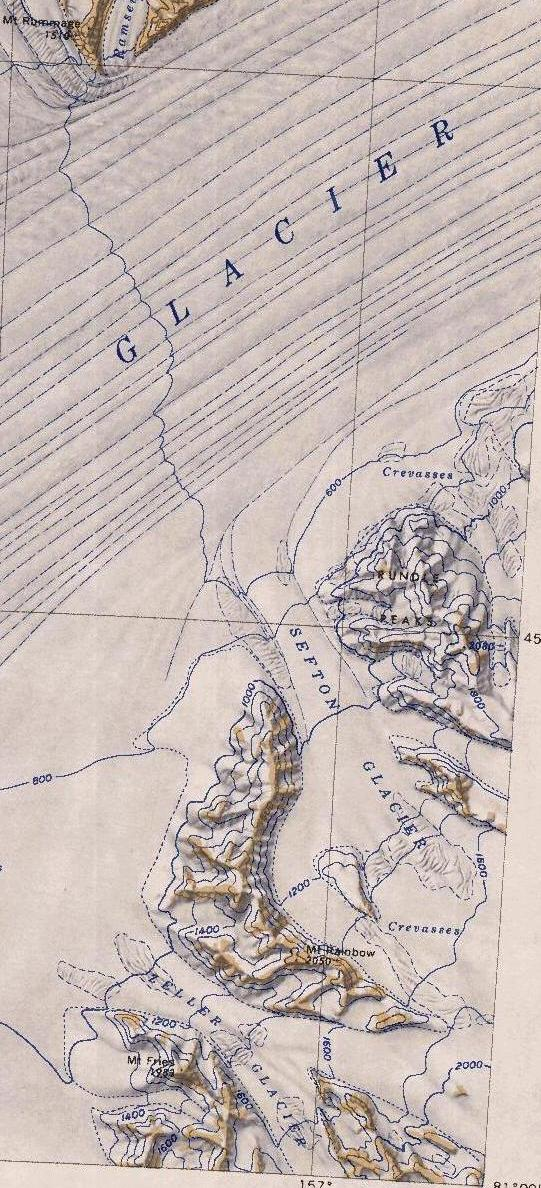
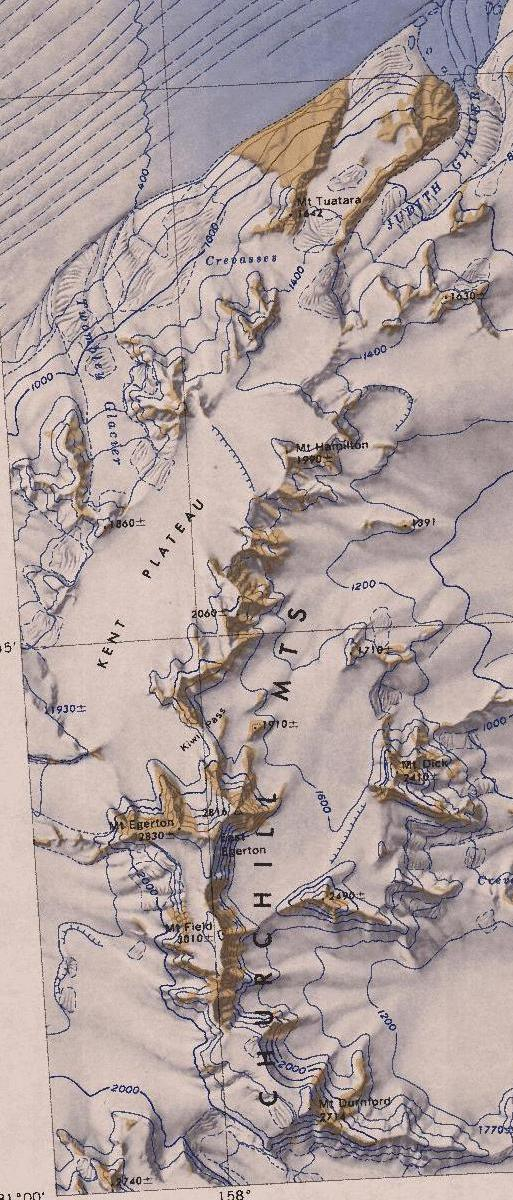
1:250,000 scale maps of Kent Plateau and surroundings

Nearby features to the east include, from south to north:

=== Mount Morse ===
80°49′S 157°21′E. A mountain rising to over 1,800 metres (5,900 ft) at the end of the ridge extending west from Mount Egerton. The feature is 6 nautical miles (11 km) west of the Mount Egerton summit. Mount Morse was named by the Advisory Committee on Antarctic Names after Robert M. Morse of the Department of Physics, University of Wisconsin, a United States Antarctic Program principal investigator from 1989 to 2002, including research relating to the Antarctic Muon And Neutrino Detector Array near South Pole Station.

=== Kiwi Pass ===
80°48′S 158°00′E. A high pass immediately northeast of Mount Egerton. Named by the Northern Party of the NZGSAE (1960–61) who used the pass in crossing these mountains. Kiwi is a familiar nickname for New Zealanders. Not: Kiwi Saddle.

=== Mount Moa ===
80°46′S 157°57′E. A mountain rising above 2,000 metres (6,600 ft) at the northern end of the Churchill Mountains. Located above Kiwi Pass and at the southern end of Kent Plateau, it was named after an extinct and flightless bird species in New Zealand, the moa (Dinornis gigantea). The naming is in association with the adjacent feature, Kiwi Pass, which was named after a familiar nickname for New Zealanders, the kiwi being also a species of flightless bird (currently endangered and protected) found only in New Zealand.

=== Mount Hamilton ===
80°40′S 158°17′E. A mountain, 1,990 metres (6,530 ft) high, standing at the east edge of Kent Plateau, 7 miles (11 km) south of Mount Tuatara. Discovered by the BrNAE (1901–04) and named for Admiral Sir Richard Vesey Hamilton, who served on Arctic voyages (1850–54) and was a member of the Ship Committee for this expedition.

=== Cupcake Peaks ===
80°42′S 158°36′E). Two rounded peaks, or nunataks, which rise to 1,391 metres (4,564 ft) 3 nautical miles (6 km) southeast of Mount Hamilton. The allusive name given by the Advisory Committee on Antarctic Names is suggestive of the appearance of the peaks.

== Nearby features to the west and north ==
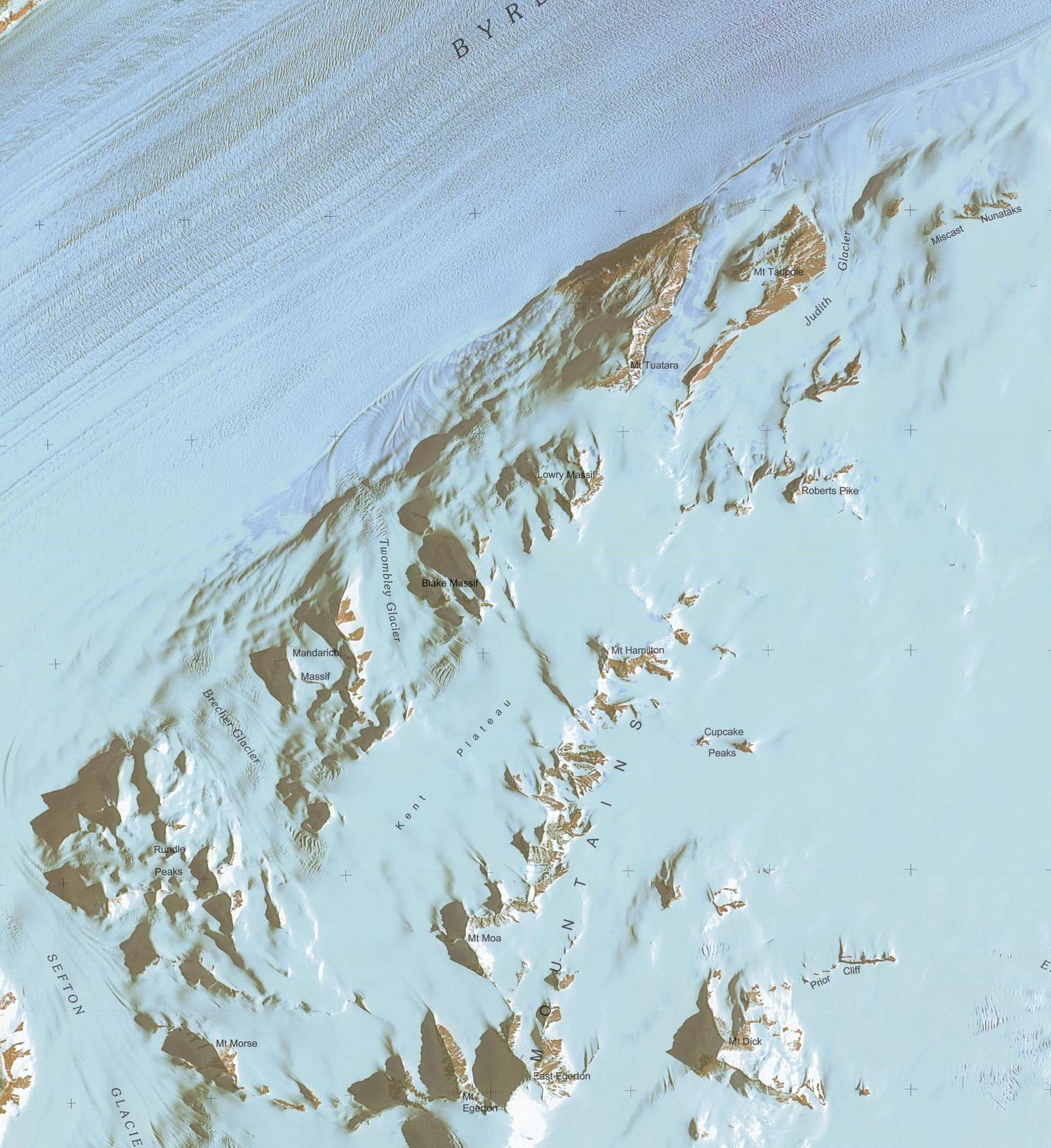
Satellite image of the plateau and surroundings

Nearby features to the west and north, along the southern edge of the Byrd Glacier, include from southwest to northeast, Keating Massif, Mount Fries, Zeller Glacier, Mount Rainbow, Sefton Glacier, the Rundle Peaks, Brecher Glacier, Mandarich Massif, Twombley Glacier, Blake Massif, Lowry Massif, Mount Tuatara, Judith Glacier, Mount Tadpole, the Miscast Nunataks and Couzens Saddle. Roberts Pike and Carr Crest are isolated features to the east of Lowry Massif.

=== Keating Massif ===
81°N 156.5666667°E. A rugged mainly ice-covered massif, 20 kilometres (12 mi) long, rising to approximately 2,370 metres (7,780 ft), and lying northwest. It is located at the southern edge of the head of Byrd Glacier. The feature includes Mount Fries and forms the southwestern boundary of Zeller Glacier. Named in honor of Colin Keating, who was the Secretary for Justice from 1997–2000. He had a distinguished 30 year career in the Public Service, mostly with the Ministry of Foreign Affairs and Trade, during which time he had a significant Antarctic focus through his work in the Legal Division and then as the Deputy Secretary responsible for Multi Lateral Affairs, which included the Legal and Antarctic Divisions. Later, as the Deputy Secretary responsible for Corporate Affairs, he retained authority for the Antarctic Policy Unit, at a time of considerable changes to the organizational structure of New Zealand Antarctic institutions from 1985 through to 1993. He provided much of the intellectual input behind New Zealand's work leading to the adoption of the Environment Protocol.

=== Mount Fries ===
80°57′S 156°36′E A prominent peak, 1,985 metres (6,512 ft) high, standing just south of the mouth of Zeller Glacier and being one of the westernmost summits along the south wall of Byrd Glacier. Named by US-ACAN for Robert H. Fries, aurora scientist at the South Pole Station, 1963.

=== Mount Rainbow ===
80°54′S 156°55′E. A peak, 2,050 m, along the south side of Byrd Glacier, surmounting the broad ridge between Zeller and Sefton Glaciers. So named by the NZGSAE (1960–61) as the peak consists of multi-colored beds of sandstone with probable dolerite sitting on pink-green limestone.

=== Rundle Peaks ===
80°44′S 157°12′E. A cluster of mainly ice-covered peaks at the south side of Byrd Glacier, just east of Sefton Glacier. Named by US-ACAN for Arthur S. Rundle, a member of the USARP parties which made glaciological and geophysical studies on the Ross Ice Shelf, 1961–62 and 1962-63.

=== Mandarich Massif ===
80°41′S 157°40′E. A rugged Y-shaped massif which rises to 1,860 metres (6,100 ft) on the south side of Byrd Glacier in Antarctica. It stands between Brecher Glacier and Twombley Glacier, two southern tributaries to Byrd Glacier. The massif was named by the Advisory Committee on Antarctic Names after Captain (later Rear Admiral) Stevan Mandarich (1911–2001), U.S. Navy, Chief of Staff to Rear Admiral Richard E. Byrd on Operation Deep Freeze I, 1955–56.

=== Blake Massif ===
80°38′S 158°0′E. A compact block of ridgelines without a prominent culminating summit, rising to approximately 1,800 metres (5,900 ft) on the south side of Byrd Glacier. The unit lies between Lowry Massif to the northeast and Mandarich Massif to the southwest. It was named in honor of Sir Peter Blake, who died in December 2001 during an environmental awareness expedition on the Amazon River. He was an exceptional sailor, and sought to raise worldwide awareness of environmental issues, to help protect life in, on and around the waters of the world. He sailed to the Antarctic Peninsula aboard the Seamaster in January 2001.

=== Lowry Massif ===
80°37′S 158°12′E. A compact block of ridgelines without a prominent culminating summit, rising to about 1,800 metres (6,000 ft) on the south side of Byrd Glacier. The unit is 3 nautical miles (6 km) long and stands 3 nautical miles south-southwest of Mount Tuatara. A section of Shackleton Limestone was measured here by United States Antarctic Program geologist Edmund Stump on November 21, 2000. The massif is named after geologist Patrick H. Lowry, a member of Stump's Arizona State University field parties, 1977–78 and 1978–79, the latter season being in the Byrd Glacier area.

=== Mount Tuatara ===
80°34′S 158°20′E. A mountain, 1,640 metres (5,380 ft) high, standing on the south side of Byrd Glacier, 7 miles (11 km) north of Mount Hamilton. Mapped by the NZGSAE (1960–61) who so named it because the long spiny summit ridge resembles a lizard.

=== Mount Tadpole ===
80°31′S 158°41′E. A rounded and mostly ice-free mountain, about 1,000 metres (3,300 ft) high, with a narrow ridge running southwest from the main mass. The mountain is 4 nautical miles (7 km) east-northeast of Mount Tuatara on the south side of Byrd Glacier. So named by Advisory Committee on Antarctic Names (US-ACAN) because of the appearance of the mountain.

=== Miscast Nunataks ===
80°30′S 159°9′E. A group of four nunataks which rise to 910 metres (3,000 ft) on the south side of Byrd Glacier. The outcrops lie between Mount Tadpole and Mount Madison. To their East is Couzens Saddle. The feature was geologically mapped as Dick Formation, a clastic, sandstone unit, by the New Zealand Geological Survey in 1960–61. The current name arose following remapping by United States Antarctic Program geologist Edmund Stump in 2000–01, and the determination that the entire outcrop is not sandstone but Shackleton Limestone.

=== Couzens Saddle ===
80°31′S 159°35′E A saddle rising to approximately 500 metres (1,600 ft), between the Miscast Nunataks and Mount Madison at west and east, and Byrd Glacier and Couzens Bay at north and south. It was named at the suggestion of the US Advisory Committee on Antarctic Names, in association with Couzens Bay, which was named by the New Zealand Geological Survey Antarctic Expedition (1960–61) in honor of Lieutenant Thomas Couzens, Royal New Zealand Air Force, who lost his life in a crevasse accident near Cape Selborne on 19 November 1959.

=== Roberts Pike ===
80°36′S 158°45′E. A peak rising to 1,630 metres (5,350 ft), 5 nautical miles (9 km) southeast of Mount Tuatara. The culmination of several ridgelines, the summit commands a view of the drainage areas of Judith Glacier, Entrikin Glacier, and Couzens Bay. It was named by Advisory Committee on Antarctic Names (US-ACAN) after John "J.R." Roberts, a New Zealand mountaineer and field guide in 12 Antarctic seasons with United States Antarctic Program (USAP), 1987–88 to 2000–01, the last season in Churchill Mountains including work at this peak.

=== Carr Crest ===
80°38′S 159°23′E. A rock summit rising to 1,200 metres (3,900 ft). It is 12 kilometres (7.5 mi) east south east of Roberts Pike and overlooks Couzens Bay due east. It was named in honor of Roderick Carr, a member of Shackleton's Expedition of 1914–17.

== Sources ==
- Alberts, Fred G., ed. (1995), Geographic Names of the Antarctic (PDF) (2 ed.), United States Board on Geographic Names This article incorporates public domain material from websites or documents of the United States Board on Geographic Names.
- "Blake Massif", Geographic Names Information System, United States Geological Survey, United States Department of the Interior
- "Brecher Glacier", Geographic Names Information System, United States Geological Survey, United States Department of the Interior
- Cape Selborne, USGS United States Geologic Survey, 1960
- "Carr Crest", Geographic Names Information System, United States Geological Survey, United States Department of the Interior
- "Couzens Saddle", Geographic Names Information System, United States Geological Survey, United States Department of the Interior
- "Cupcake Peaks", Geographic Names Information System, United States Geological Survey, United States Department of the Interior
- "Lowry Massif", Geographic Names Information System, United States Geological Survey, United States Department of the Interior
- "Keating Massif", Geographic Names Information System, United States Geological Survey, United States Department of the Interior
- "Mandarich Massif", Geographic Names Information System, United States Geological Survey, United States Department of the Interior
- McCormick, Herb (7 December 2001). "On Yachting; Peter Blake's Legacy Spans the World". New York Times.
- "Miscast Nunataks", Geographic Names Information System, United States Geological Survey, United States Department of the Interior
- "Mount Moa", Geographic Names Information System, United States Geological Survey, United States Department of the Interior
- "Mount Morse", Geographic Names Information System, United States Geological Survey, United States Department of the Interior
- Mount Olympus, USGS United States Geologic Survey, 1960
- "Mount Tadpole", Geographic Names Information System, United States Geological Survey, United States Department of the Interior
- Nicholson Peninsula, USGS
- "Roberts Pike", Geographic Names Information System, United States Geological Survey, United States Department of the Interior
