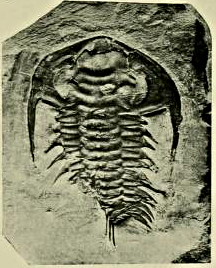
- Holmia kjerulfi, as depicted by Kiaer, 1916

Scientific classification
- Kingdom: Animalia
- Phylum: Arthropoda
- Clade: †Artiopoda
- Class: †Trilobita
- Order: †Redlichiida
- Family: †Holmiidae
- Genus: †Holmia; Matthew, 1890

Species
- H. kjerulfi (Linnarsson, 1871) (Type), synonym Paradoxides kjerulfi; H. mobergi Bergstroem, 1973, synonym Baltobergstroemia mobergi; H. glabra Orlowski, 1974; H. grandis Kiaer, 1916; H. inusitata Ahlberg & Bergstroem in Ahlberg et al., 1986, synonym Baltobergstroemia inusitata; H. lapponica Ahlberg & Bergstroem 1983; H. nelsoni Cobos, 1981; H. orienta; H. palpebra (Ahlberg, 1984); H. sulcata Bergstroem, 1973, synonym Baltobergstroemia sulcata

= Holmia (trilobite) =

Holmia Temporal range: Atdabanian (Holmia - Protolenus-zone)

Genus of trilobites

Holmia is a genus of a well known group of extinct arthropods, the trilobites, that lived during the Lower Cambrian (Atdabanian) in what are now Scandinavia, Poland and Morocco.

== Etymology ==
Holmia is the Latin name for Stockholm, in the neighborhood of which early finds of this trilobite were collected. H. kjerulfi was named in honor of the Norwegian geologist and paleontologist Theodor Kjerulf.

== Taxonomy ==
=== Species previously assigned to Holmia ===
- H. hyperborea = Mesolenellus hyperborea
- H. ljungneri = Fallotaspis ljungneri
- H. lundgreni = Elliptocephala lundgreni
- H. macer = Mummaspis macer
- H. mickwitzi = Schmidtiellus mickwitzi
- H. mirabilis = Elliptocephala mirabilis
- H. rowei = Esmeraldina rowei

== Distribution ==
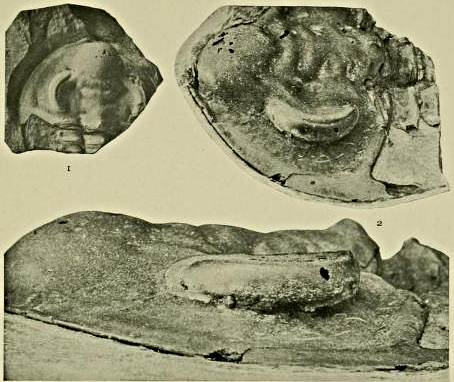
Cephalon of Holmia kjerulfi, from different angles

- H. kjerulfi occurs in the Lower Cambrian of Norway (near Tomten, Sparagmite Formation, Mjøsen, Atdabanian, 60.9° N, 10.7° E), and Poland (Ocieseki Sandstone Formation, Holy Cross Mountains, Atdabanian, 51.0° N, 20.0° E).
- H. grandis occurs in the Lower Cambrian of Norway (near Tomten, Sparagmite Formation, Mjøsen, Atdabanian, 60.9° N, 10.7° E).
- H. glabra and H. orienta are found in the Lower Cambrian of Poland (Ocieseki Sandstone Formation, Holy Cross Mountains, Atdabanian).
- H. lapponica was found in the Lower Cambrian of Sweden (Grammajukku Formation, Holmia kjerulfi-zone, on the NE shore of Lake Långvattnet near Långsjöby, 10 km W of the village of Storuman, county of Västerbotten, southern Swedish Lapland).
- H. palpebra was collected from the Lower Cambrian of Sweden (Upper part of the Grammajukku Formation, in the Holmia kjerulfi-zone, E bank of the Torbacken rivulet, about 600 m South-Southwest of Delliknäs, the Laisvall area, central Swedish Lapland).
- Unidentified specimen probably belonging to Holmia are also known from the Lower Cambrian of Morocco (Issafen Formation, Antatlasia gutta-pluviae/Sectigena-zone, Atdabanian), and Sweden (shore 600 m North of Gislövshammar, Gislöv Formation, Atdabanian (55.5° N, 14.3° E).
