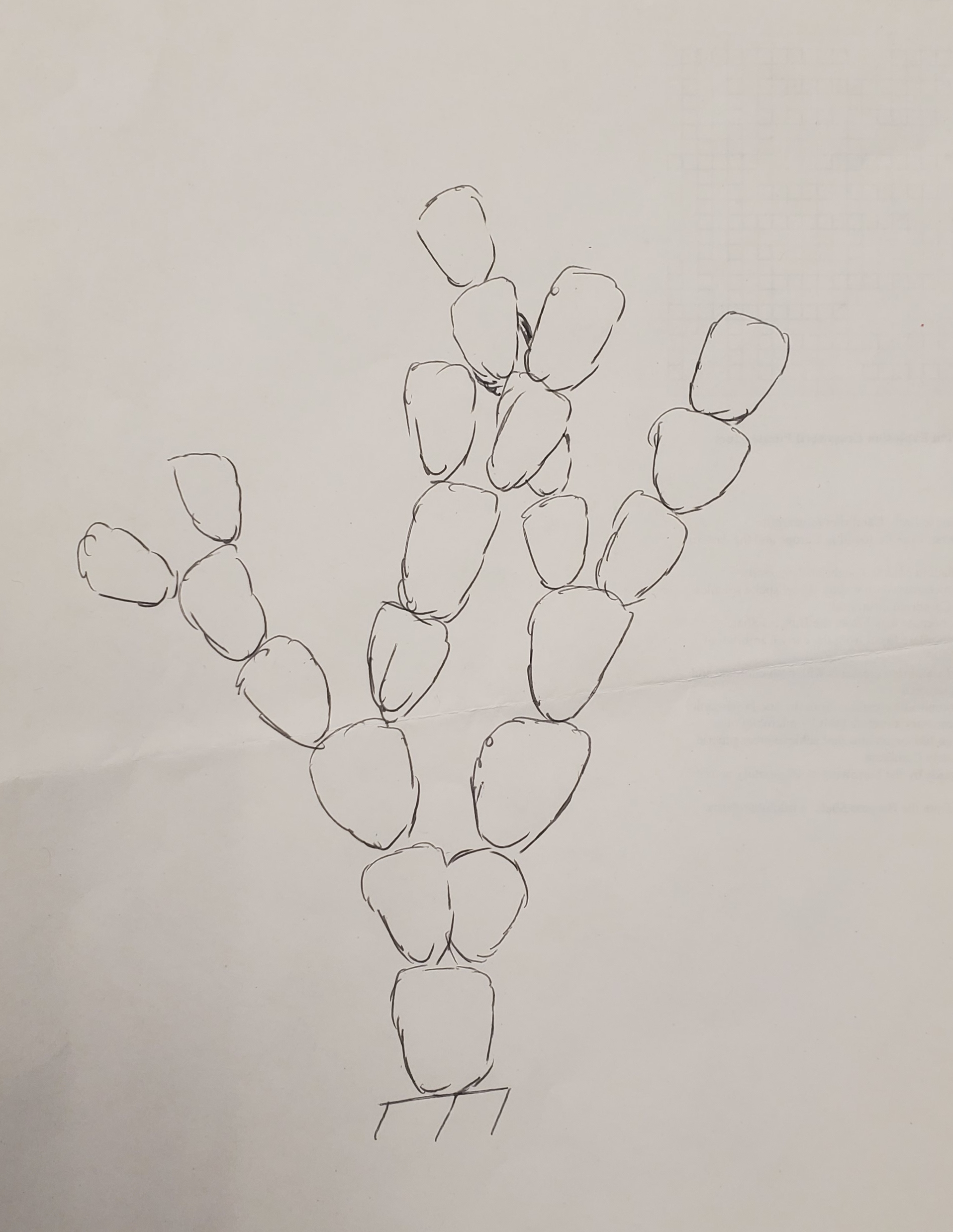
- Reconstruction by Gemma Golovner, redrawn after Rowland and Rodriguez (2014)

Scientific classification
- Domain: Eukaryota
- Clade: Archaeplastida
- Clade: Viridiplantae (?)
- Genus: †Elainabella; Rowland & Rodriguez, 2014
- Species: †E. deepspringensis

Binomial name
- †Elainabella deepspringensis Rowland & Rodriguez, 2014

= Elainabella =

Extinct genus of algae

Elainabella is a 560 million-year-old fossil of the first multicellular alga. It was discovered in 2014 in Nevada by Steve Rowland and Margarita Rodriguez, a paleontologist and alumna duo from the University of Nevada, Las Vegas. The specific species name for the Elainabella fossil found is E. deepspringensis. Elainabella is named after Elaine Hatch Sawyer, Rodriguez's mentor, and deepspringensis is named after the Deep Spring Formation, that being the rock layer where the fossils were found. The fossil is from the Ediacaran period and was found near Gold Point, Esmeralda County, Nevada in the Deep Spring Lagerstatte. The Elainabella holotype is housed in the Nevada State Museum, Las Vegas.

Soft tissue is normally not preserved in fossils. However, Elainabella shows cellular structure. The fossil is quite small, only one millimeter wide and has subsidiary, thinner branches. It was interpreted as being the thallus of a multicellular alga. It does not have any shell; its preservation represents a case of soft-bodied preservation. Rowland believes that, when alive, Elainabella would have lived as part of a microbial reef community. These reefs occurred on the West Coast of North America, which was near the equator at the time.

Elainebella does not comfortably fit into any known Ediacaran or metazoan taxon. While it is similar to some green algae, like in having similar segmented branches, the discoverers did not place Elainabella with them because of differences such as in size. The cellular structure of Elainabella is unlike that of any siphonous taxon.
