= Reed Dolomite =

Geologic formation in California, United States

- Stratigraphic range: Ediacaran
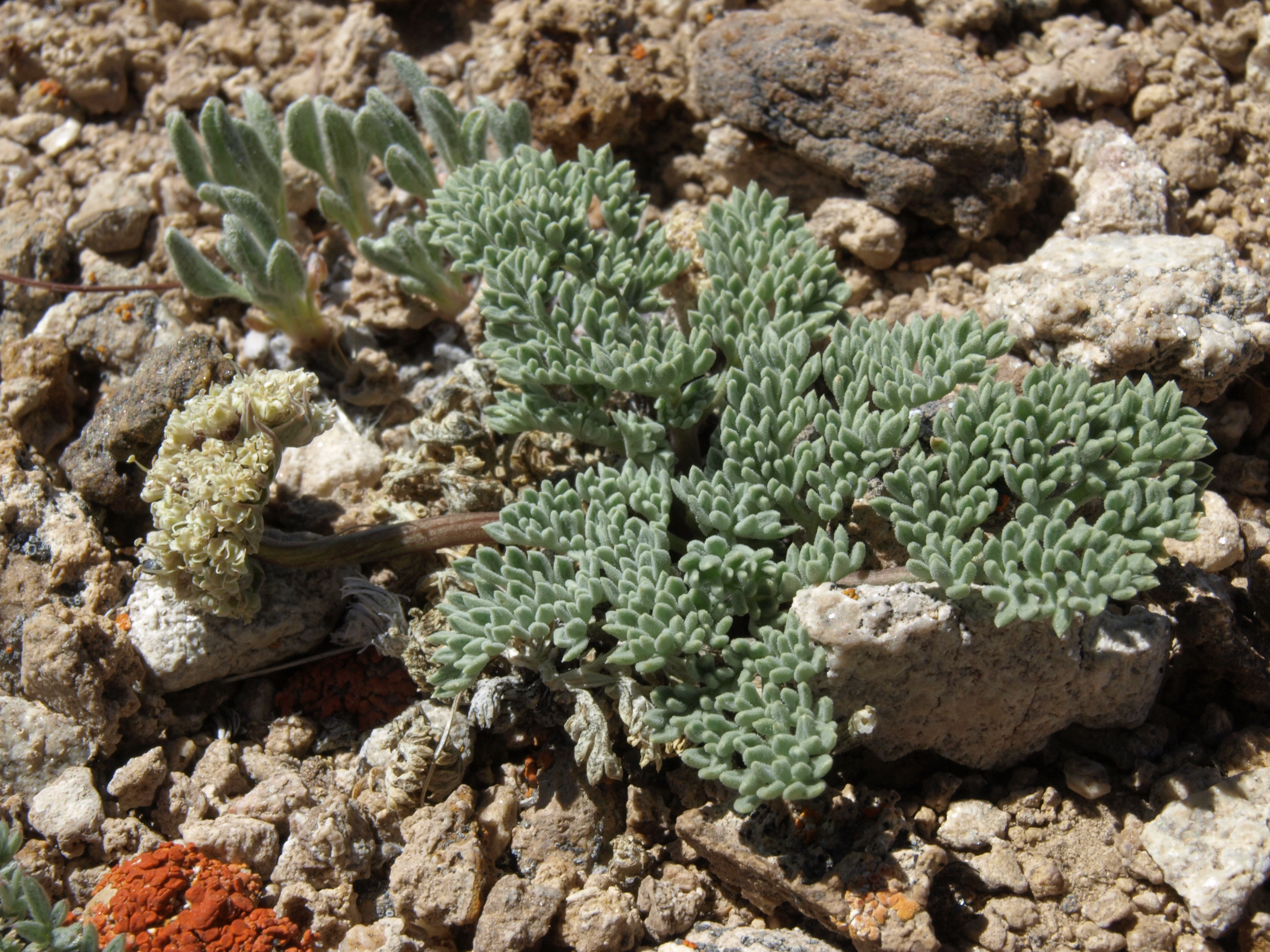
- Cymopterus cinerarius, growing on substrate within the Reed Dolomite
- Type: Geological Formation
- Sub-units: Lower, Hines Tongue, and Upper Members
- Underlies: Deep Spring Formation
- Overlies: Wyman Formation
- Thickness: 0–1,600 ft (0–488 m)

Lithology
- Primary: Dolomite
- Other: Quartzite, Sandstone

Location
- Region: California, Nevada
- Country: United States

The Reed Dolomite is an Ediacaran aged geologic formation in California, outcropping in the White and Inyo Mountains, as well as Esmeralda County, Nevada, and is fossiliferous in nature.

== Geology ==
The Reed Dolomite, as its name suggests, is mainly composed of medium-gray, yellowish-gray, and pale-yellowish-brown medium to coarse-crystalline dolomite. Within these dolomites, oolites, pisolites and irregular pellets, which all may be algal in origin.

=== Members ===
The Reed Dolomite contains three members, which are as follows, in stratigraphic order (lowest to highest):

- Lower Member: This member is primarily composed of coarse-crystalline pink dolostone, which is cross-bedded with oolthic horizons and minor domal stromatolite horizons, and was most likely deposited in a sub-tidal to inter-tidal marine environment.
- Hines Tongue: The Hines Tongue forms the middle member of the formation, as is a wedge of clastic material, which can get up to 800 ft (240 m). It contains a number of minerals, but is primarily composed of yellowish-gray or very-pale-orange evenly laminated quartzite and calcareous sandstone, some of which is very fine to fine, and fine to medium grained. There is also medium-gray to pale-yellowish-brown dolomite, limestone, sandy dolomite, and sandy limestone within the wedge. It is also inter-stratified with quartzite and calcareous sandstone. There are also small yellowish-gray to pale-yellowish-brown siltstone, and may have been deposited below a normal wave base, but above the storm base. It also contains a number of trace fossils throughout.
- Upper Member: This member is predominately composed of massive dolostones, with minor karstification at the contact point with the overlying Deep Spring Formation. It is also known to contain packstones of Cloudina.

== Paleobiota ==
The Reed Dolomite contains a number of algal structures, as well as the mollusc like fossils Wyattia, and ichnogenera such as the Skolithos burrows.

Color key: Taxon / Reclassified taxon / Taxon falsely reported as present / Dubious taxon or junior synonym / Ichnotaxon / Ootaxon / Morphotaxon

Notes
Uncertain or tentative taxa are in small text
~~crossed out~~ taxa are discredited.

=== incertae sedis ===
Genus	Species	Notes	Images
Wyattia	W. reedensis	Mollusc-like fossil. May by synonymous with Cloudina, though this is tenuous at best.	
Cloudina	C. hartmannae	Tubular fossil.	

=== Flora ===
Genus	Species	Notes	Images
Possible Algal Structures	???	Flattened, spherical structures, half an inch across.	

=== Ichnogenera ===
Genus	Species	Notes	Images
Skolithos	Skolithos sp.	Burrows.	
Helminthoidichnites	Helminthoidichnites sp.	Burrows.	
Planolites	Planolites sp.	Burrows.	
Torrowangea	Torrowangea sp.	Burrows.	
