= Marocella =

Marocella Temporal range: Early-Middle Cambrian ~516–505 Ma
- Marocella source: Evans, 1992

Scientific classification
- Kingdom: Animalia
- Phylum: Mollusca
- Class: incertae sedis
- Genus: Marocella Geyer, 1986

Type species
- Marocella mira

Species
- M. antiqua; M. australica; M. depressa; M. mira; M. morenensis; M. tichkaensis

Genus of molluscs

Marocella is a conical shelly fossil of uncertain affinity (probably a mollusc) known from Cambrian strata of Europe, Morocco, Australia and Antarctica.

== Morphology ==
Limpet-like Marocella is a low conical shell with concentric ridges that grew to a couple of centimetres in length.

== Affinity ==
Marocella is thought to be a mollusc, although its position within this phylum is undetermined. Relationship to the halkieriids has also been considered.

== Ecology ==
Some specimens show evidence of repairing damage caused by predators. It probably moved around on the sea floor. It was geographically widespread.

== Distribution ==
Fossils of Marocella have been found in:

- Shackleton Limestone, Antarctica
- Mernmerna Formation and Parara Limestone, Australia
- Jbel Wawrmast Formation, Morocco
- Sparagmite Formation, Norway
- Láncara Formation, Spain
