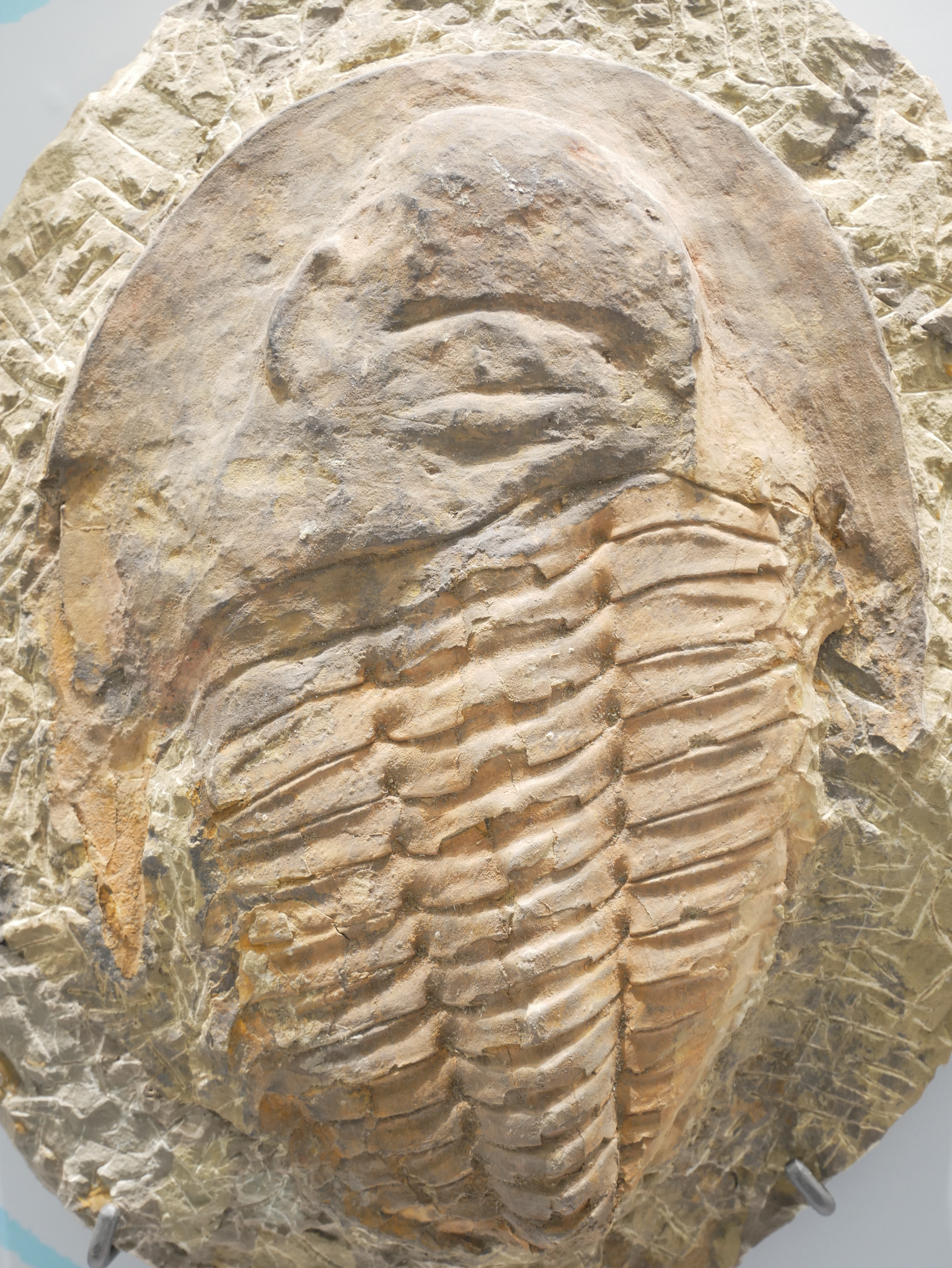
- Cambropallas telesto, from Morocco

Scientific classification
- Kingdom: Animalia
- Phylum: Arthropoda
- Clade: †Artiopoda
- Class: †Trilobita
- Order: †Redlichiida
- Suborder: †Olenellina
- Superfamily: †Olenelloidea
- Family: †Holmiidae; Hupé, 1953

= Holmiidae =

Holmiidae Temporal range: Atdabanian

Family of trilobites

Holmiidae is a family of trilobites, that lived during the Lower Cambrian (Atdabanian). The Holmiidae is a diverse family of eight genera containing at least 17 species. It includes some of the earliest trilobites of Baltica. Holmiidae occur throughout Baltica (Scandinavia and the eastern seaboard of the Baltic Sea) and Western Laurentia (in the Great Basin of the US and northwestern Canada), and also in Morocco.

== Taxonomy ==
Hupé (1953) defined the Holmiidae as a subfamily (Holmiinae) within the Olenellidae containing Holmia, Kjerulfia and Bondonella. Harrington et al. (1959) excluded Kjerulfia, while assigning Schmidtiellus to it. Bergström (1973) included Holmia, Elliptocephala, Esmeraldina, Schmidtiellus and Wanneria. Repina (1979) assigned Holmia, Schmidtiellus, Kjerulfia, Elliptocephala, Bondonella, Andalusiana and Holmiella to the Holmiinae, that together with the monotypic Callaviinae comprised the Holmiidae. Palmer and Repina (1993) added Holmiella but excluded Kjerulfia, they assigned to the Callaviinae. Lieberman, who made cladistic analyses of the Olenellina and the included superfamilies, regards Andalusiana an advanced "Nevadioidea", Callavia and Bondonella as Judomioidea, and Elliptocephala and Wanneria stemgroup genera closely related to the common ancestor of the Holmiidae and the Biceratopsidae.

== Genera ==
- Andalusiana Lotze 1958
- Callavia Matthew 1897
- Cambropallas Geyer 1993
- Elliptocephala
- Esmeraldina Resser and Howell, 1938
- Grandinasus Hollingsworth, 2006
- Holmia Matthew, 1890 synonym Baltobergstroemia
- Holmiella Fritz, 1972
- Iyouella Geyer and Palmer 1995
- Kjerulfia Kiaer, 1917
- Montezumaspis Hollingsworth, 2006
- Palmettaspis Fritz, 1995
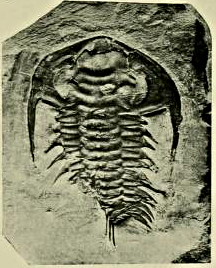
- Holmia kjerulfi
  Schmidtiellus Moberg in Moberg and Segerberg, 1906

=== Relationships within the Holmiidae ===
The eye ridges in Baltic and Moroccan Holmiidae (Holmia, Schmidtiellus) are wide, have a furrow atop the ridges, and the resulting inner band merges with the frontal lobe (L4) of the glabella without an axial furrow. This is interpreted as advanced compared with the arrangement of the simple ocular lobes of Laurentian holmiids, which are separated from the L4 by a prominent axial furrow around the glabellar outline.

== Description ==
As with most early trilobites, Holmiidae have an almost flat exoskeleton, that is only thinly calcified, and has crescent-shaped eye ridges. As part of the Olenellina suborder, the Holmiidae lack dorsal sutures in the cephalon. Like all other members of the Olenelloidea superfamily, the eye-ridges spring from the back of the frontal lobe (L4) of the central area of the cephalon (or glabella). Specifically for the Holmiidae are the following diagnostic characters. The glabella is straight-sided to somewhat constricted and mostly expands forward. The frontal lobe (or L4) is usually broad and rounded. The furrows that separate the lobes are usually curved, moderately incised, and rarely completely cross the midline. The eye ridges of Baltic holmiids are often wide with an ocular furrow, inner band merging with L4 without axial furrow. Laurentian holmiids (Montezumaspis, Palmetaspis, Grandasinus, Esmeraldina and Holmiella) have unfurrowed ocular lobes separated from L4 by axial furrow. The cephalon carries so called genal spines at the corner between the half circle front/side margin and the back margin that is roughly perpendicular to the midline. These spines extend back to at least the fourth thorax segment (T4), counted front to back. The back margin of the cephalon normally carries a node or spine (or intergenal spine), straight behind the point the eye ridge is furthest from the midline or even somewhat further out. Back margin of cephalon inside the intergenal angle transverse or directed posteriorly. The third thorax segment (T3) is not larger than the neighboring segments and does not carry larger spines. Anterior thoracic pleural spines weakly to strongly thornlike except in Kjerulfia and Grandinasus.
