= Wutubus =

Wutubus Temporal range: Late Ediacaran ~551–541 Ma
- Fossil of Wutubus annularis

Scientific classification
- Domain: incertae sedis
- Genus: †Wutubus; Chen et al., 2014
- Species: †W. annularis

Binomial name
- †Wutubus annularis Chen et al., 2014

Extinct tubular organism of unknown affinities

Wutubus annularis is a large tubular fossil from the Late Ediacaran of China and the US, between 551 - 541 Ma. It is the only species in the genus Wutubus.

== Discovery and name ==
The first described specimens of Wutubus annularis were found in the Shibantan Member of the Dengying Formation in the Yangtze Gorges area of South China, which dates to 551-541 Mya during the late Ediacaran. Specimens have since been reported in late Ediacaran rocks of the Deep Spring Formation at Mount Dunfee, Nevada (USA).

The genus name Wutubus is derived from the name of the fossil locality near the village of Wuhe (Wu River) and from the Latin word tubus, to mean tube. The species epithet annularis is derived directly from the Latin word, annularis, with reference to the transverse annulae on the tube.

== Description ==
Wutubus annularis is an annulated (ringed) tubular organism 20–180 mm (0.8–7.1 in) in length and 3–32 mm (0.1–1.3 in) in width. It is mostly cylindrical, with a conical end that tapers to an apex. It has been reconstructed as a benthic tubular organism living on the sediment surface, tethered to the substrate by its apex.
