= Wyman Formation =

Geologic formation in California, United States

- Stratigraphic range: Ediacaran
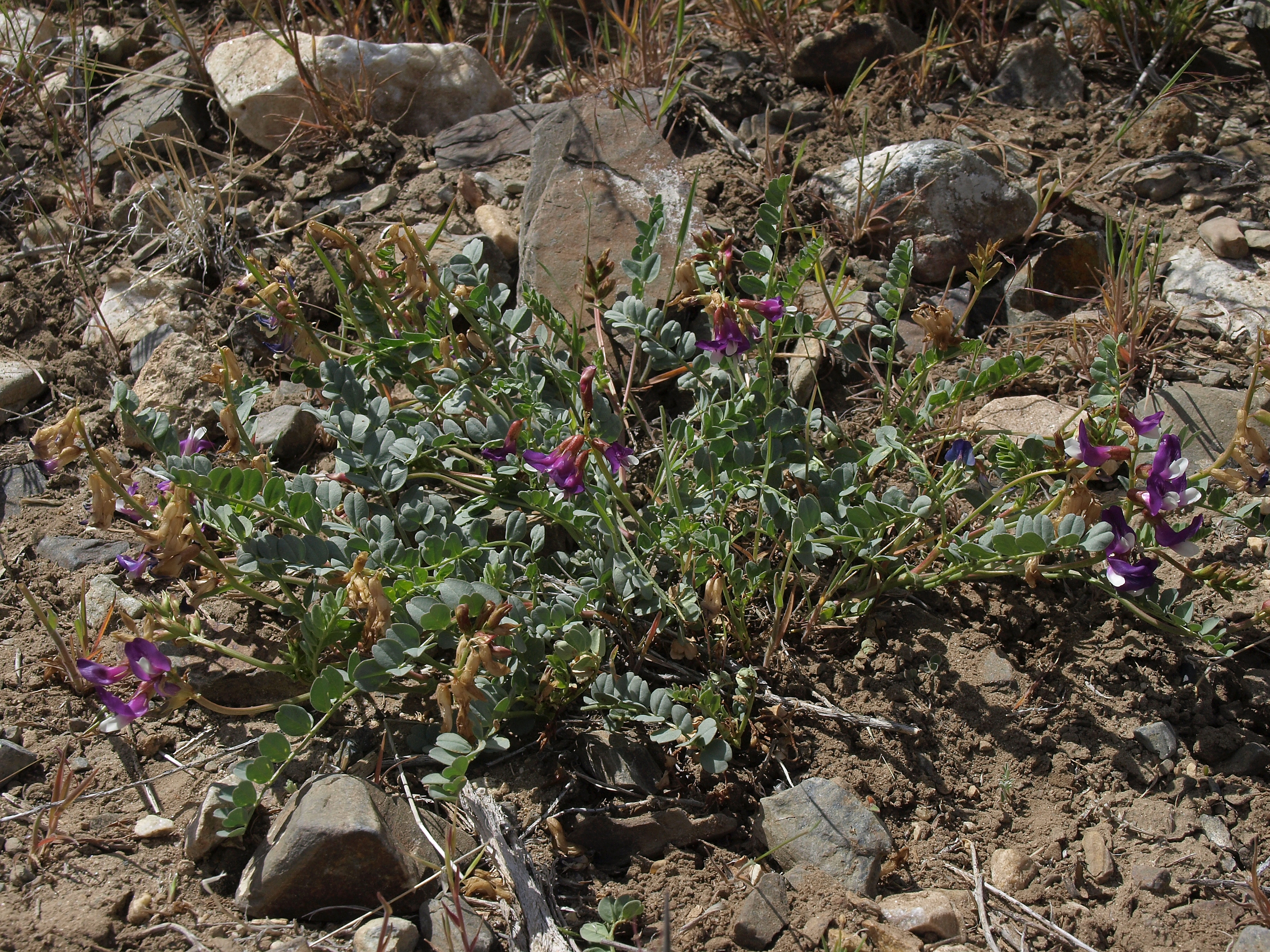
- Astragalus oophorus, growing on substrate within the Wyman Canyon, the locality after which the formation is named.
- Type: Geological Formation
- Underlies: Reed Dolomite
- Thickness: 9,000 ft (2,700 m)

Lithology
- Primary: Siltstone
- Other: Carbonate, Phyllite, Claystone

Location
- Coordinates: 37.10°N 118.09°W
- Region: California
- Country: United States

Type section
- Named for: Wyman Canyon
- Wyman Formation (California)

The Wyman Formation is an Ediacaran aged geologic formation in California, primarily within the Inyo Mountains.

== Geology ==
The Wyman Formation is mainly composed of medium-gray, olive-gray or dark-greenish-gray phyllitic siltstone, which itself contains silt-size quartz particles, mixed in with fine textured biotite, chlorite and muscovite. Inter-laid within the siltstone are layers of laminated limestone or marble, up to 50 ft (15 m) thick in some places. Some of the limestone layers are oolitic or pisolitic, the pisolitic structures possibly being algal in origin, and contain limestone pellets. Occasional dolomite layers can also be found, but may have been a result of the limestone being altered.

There are also layers of medium-gray sandy limestone and limy sandstone, only up to 1/4–8 in (0.64–20.32 cm) thick, that are inter-stratified with phyllitic siltstone. They can weather to a yellowish-brown colour, and are evenly laminated, and contain very fine grains of quartz, and small amounts of feldspar in a calcite matrix. The formation is up to 9,000 ft (2,700 m) thick in some places, although the true thickness of the formation is unknown, as the base of it is not exposed.

== Paleobiota ==
Within the upper layers of the Wyman Formation, probable fossils were found in the 1970s, although these would not be further looked at until 2024. These take the form of looping structures with a consistent width, up to 5 mm (0.2 in), with a length up to 50 cm (19.7 in), and are commonly preserved in convex hypo-relief, meaning they stick up from the rocks surface. These structures have been interpreted as probable body fossils, although the large sizes of the fossils suggests they could instead be trace fossils, possibly Gordia or similar.

Color key
| Taxon | Reclassified taxon | Taxon falsely reported as present | Dubious taxon or junior synonym | Ichnotaxon | Ootaxon | Morphotaxon |

Notes
Uncertain or tentative taxa are in small text; ~~crossed out~~ taxa are discredited.

=== Ichnogenera ===
| Genus | Species | Notes | Images |
|---|---|---|---|
| Gordia (?) | Gordia (?) sp. | Looping structures, which bare similarities to the trace fossil Gordia. | |
