= Iyouella =

Iyouella Temporal range: Stage 3

Scientific classification
- Kingdom: Animalia
- Phylum: Arthropoda
- Clade: †Artiopoda
- Class: †Trilobita
- Order: †Redlichiida
- Family: †Holmiidae
- Genus: †Iyouella; Geyer & Palmer, 1995

Extinct genus of trilobites

Iyouella is an extinct genus of trilobites in the order Redlichiida, suborder Olenellina.
