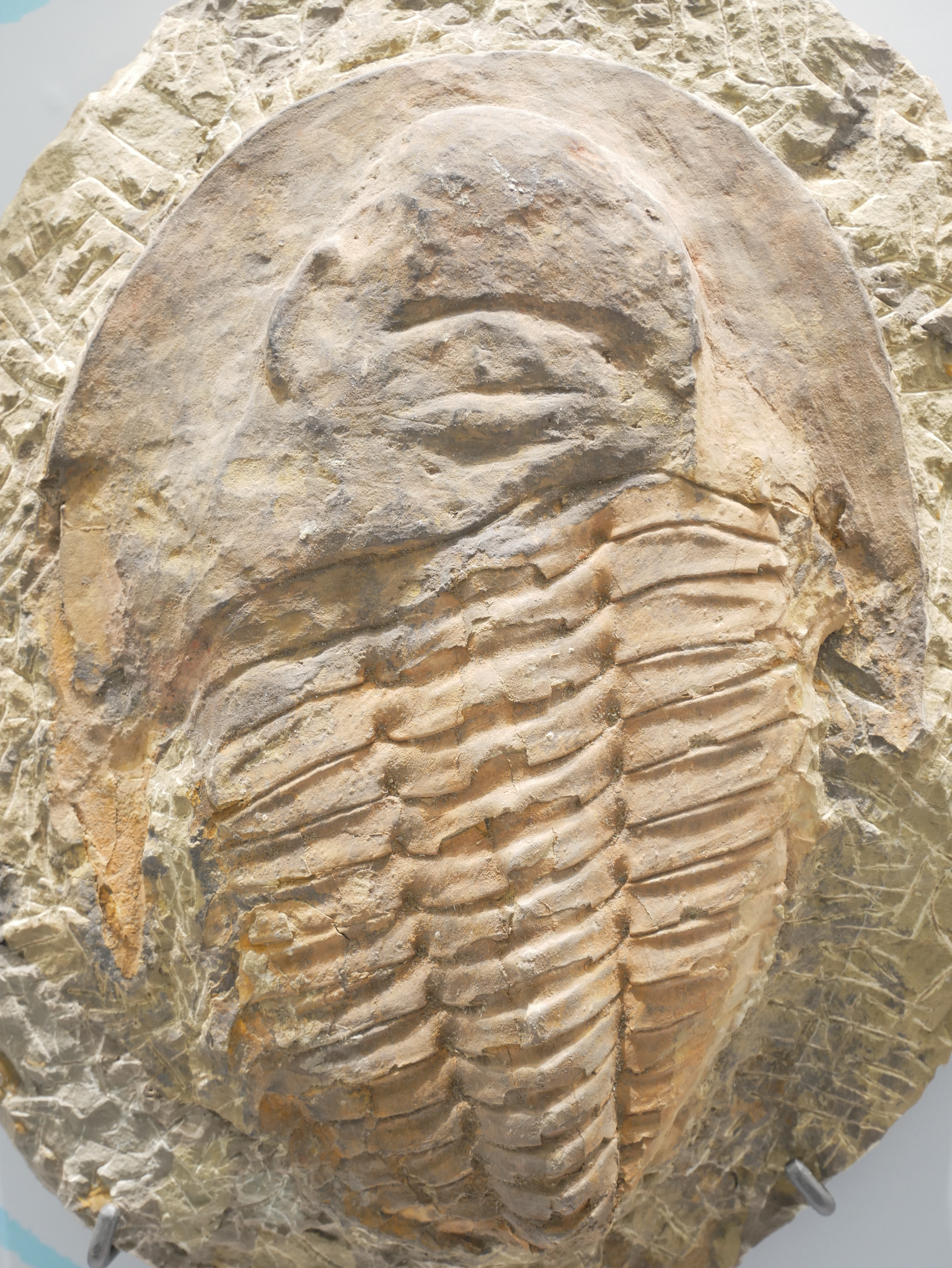
- Cambropallas telesto fossil

Scientific classification
- Kingdom: Animalia
- Phylum: Arthropoda
- Clade: †Artiopoda
- Class: †Trilobita
- Order: †Redlichiida
- Family: †Holmiidae
- Genus: †Cambropallas; Geyer, 1993
- Species: †C. telesto

Binomial name
- †Cambropallas telesto Geyer, 1993

= Cambropallas =

Cambropallas Temporal range: Series 2–Stage 5

Extinct genus of trilobites

Cambropallas is an extinct genus of trilobite in the family Holmiidae. There is one described species in Cambropallas, Cambropallas telesto.
