= Coleoloides =

Scientific classification
- Kingdom: Animalia
- Genus: Coleoloides

Coleoloides, or the coleolids, are a genus of Cambrian small shelly fossils with an aragonite skeleton. They were first described in 1889 by Charles Doolittle Walcott as members of the pteropods. Their affinity is unknown but they were probably produced by an organism of the annelid grade of complexity. Calcium carbonate fossils of coleolids have been found at Newfoundland clustered together, oriented vertically.
