= Schmidtiellus =

Schmidtiellus Temporal range: Late Atdabanian

Scientific classification
- Kingdom: Animalia
- Phylum: Arthropoda
- Clade: †Artiopoda
- Class: †Trilobita
- Order: †Redlichiida
- Family: †Holmiidae
- Genus: †Schmidtiellus; Moberg, 1906

Species
- Schmidtiellus mickwitzi; Schmidtiellus reetae

Extinct genus of trilobites

Schmidtiellus is an extinct genus of holmiid trilobites from the Cambrian of Poland. As of 2017, a Schmidtiellus reetae fossil from 530 mya, collected in Saviranna in northern Estonia, is the oldest known fossilized eye. The structure is similar to the compound eyes of modern-day dragonflies and bees, but with (~100) ommatidia with lenses spaced further apart. There are no lens structures on the top of the eye, so their vision only extends about 25-30 degrees above them.
