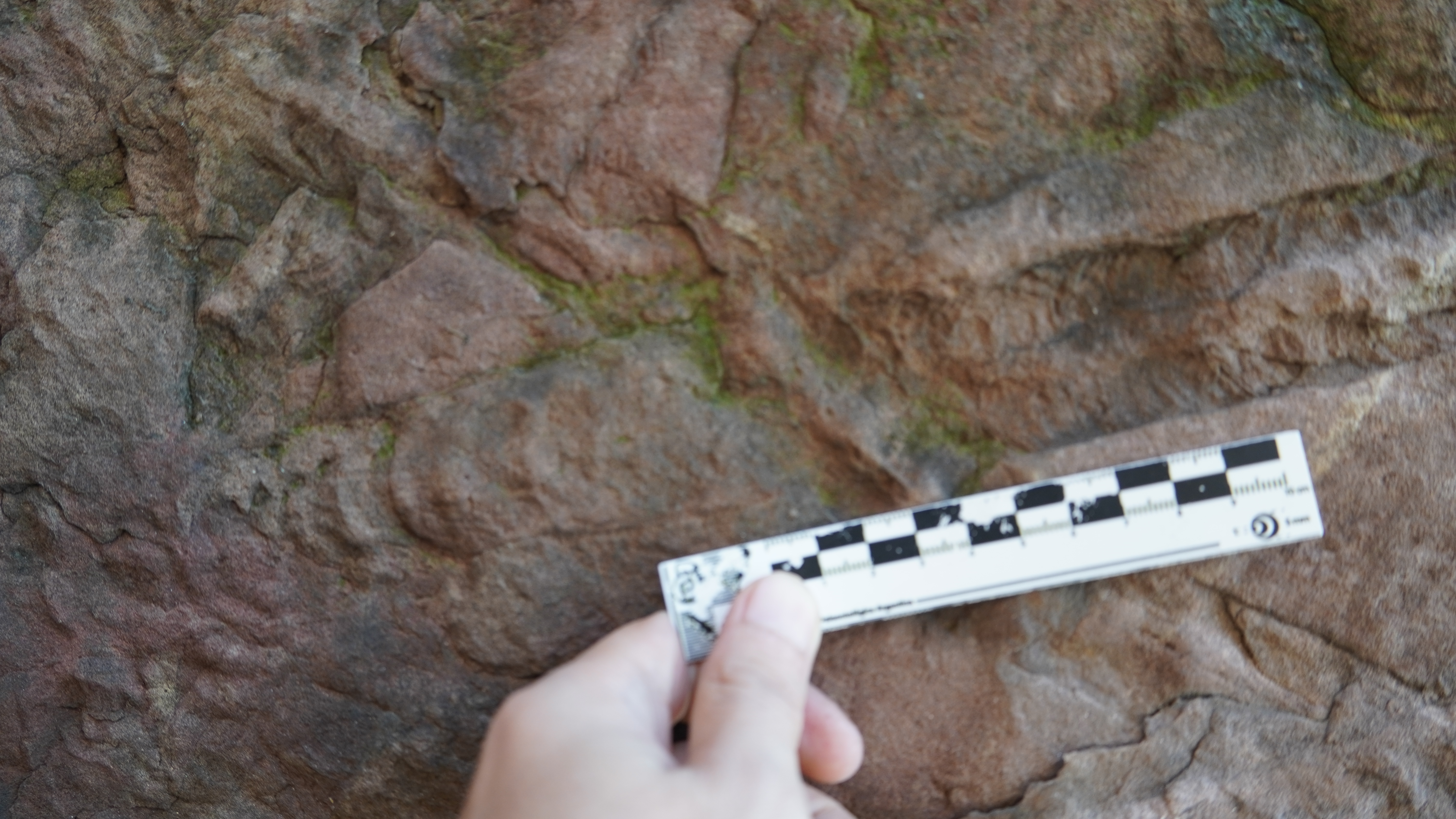
- Psammichnites trace fossils.

Trace fossil classification
- Ichnogenus: †Psammichnites; Torell, 1870

Type ichnospecies
- Psammichnites gigas Torrell, 1870

= Psammichnites =

Psammichnites Temporal range: Early Cambrian–Permian

Trace fossil

Psammichnites is an ichnogenus of trace fossils consisting primarily of large, horizontal locomotory burrows preserved in sandy or silty substrates. The traces are particularly characteristic of shallow-marine environments and are known from the Palaeozoic, with their earliest appearance dating back to the Fortunian Stage of the Cambrian. Psammichnites is notable for its large size, complex internal structure, and ability to record prolonged locomotion and sediment reworking over considerable distances.

== Diagnosis ==
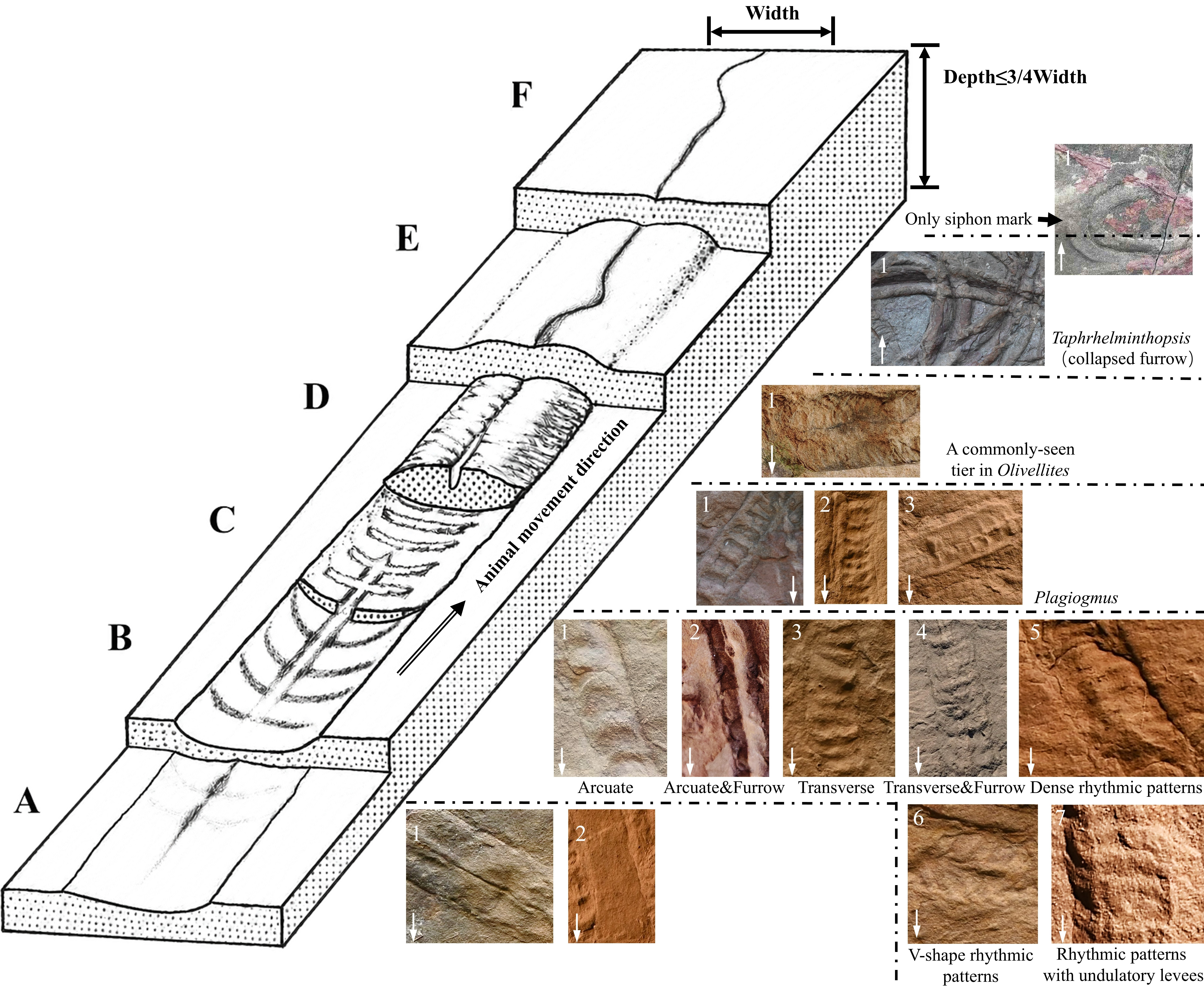
Psammichnites

The ichnogenus was established by Torell in 1870, with Psammichnites gigas being the type ichnospecies. This trace fossil is typically preserved as full-relief structures, with six levels of internal details. They are predominantly horizontal, straight to curvaceous or looping ribbon-like burrows. The basal level consists of a compressed layer, overlain by regularly spaced transverse or arcuate tongue-like fills extending obliquely backward, exhibiting ladder-like horizontal cross-sections. The wavelength of these rhythmic structures is typically 0.1–0.6 times the burrow width. The compressed base and the tongue-like fills may display a central furrow up to one-fifth of the burrow width, and they are overlain by bilobate, densely packed thin meniscal fills, with the central structure extending upward as a groove. This groove may be straight or sinusoidal, or with regularly spaced circular mounds or holes. Collapsed shallow burrows may produce a wide surficial furrow with or without transverse scratches along raised margins.

== Behaviour and lifestyle ==
Psammichnites is interpreted as a transient locomotory trace rather than a permanent dwelling burrow. The tracemaker generally moved within the sediment and only rarely travelled above the sediment surface. The traces are interpreted primarily as grazing and searching traces.

The rhythmic transverse and arcuate structures are interpreted as evidence of repeated muscular propulsion resembling those in molluscs. Meandering trajectories may reflect changes in direction during searching or grazing. Some traces exhibit repeated directional changes consistent with behavioural responses to environmental or biological stimuli. Circular or looping forms may likewise record integrated sensory and locomotory behaviour.

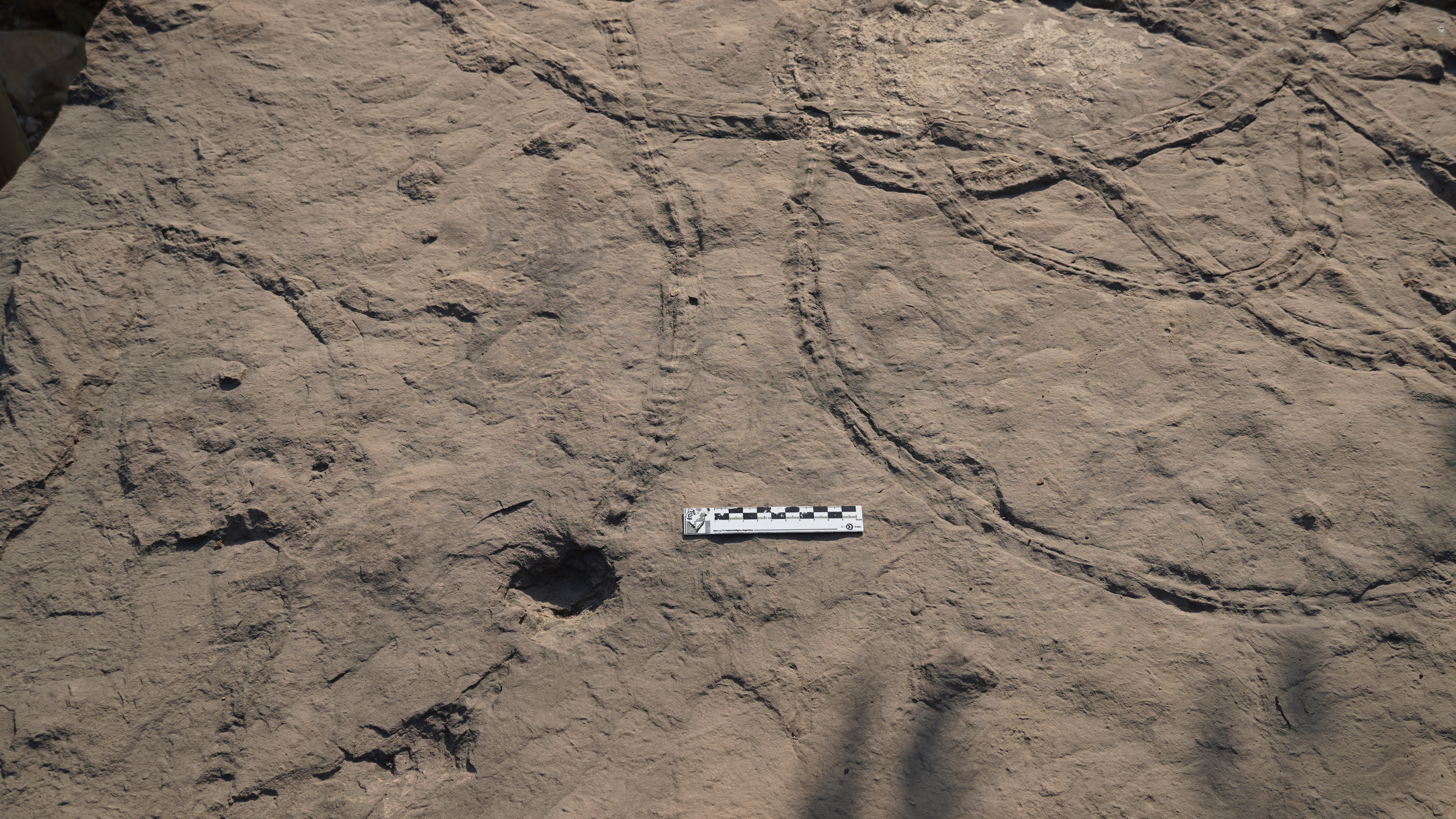
Psammichnites with periodic thrusts and fills.

The tracemaker is inferred to have possessed a relatively short-bodied, mollusc-analogous body plan, potentially including a muscular ventral foot and a ventral mouth. The morphology of the trace is also consistent with mucus secretion during locomotion. The mucus may have locally altered sediment cohesion beneath the moving animal and contributed to preservation of the basal part of the trace.

The distribution of Cambrian occurrences indicates a preference for very shallow, wave- or tide-influenced warm marine environments.

== Taxonomic history and similar trace fossils ==
The pronounced morphological variability of Psammichnites has historically resulted in the establishment of several ichnogenera for morphologically different forms. Recent specimen-based comparisons indicate that some of these forms can be accommodated within Psammichnites.

Olivellites and Plagiogmus have historically been treated as distinct ichnogenera or have been considered possible synonyms of Psammichnites. Specimen-based comparison of exceptionally preserved material in Xuzhou, China, indicates that their characteristic morphologies correspond to the Level D and C of the Psammichnites morphology.

Taphrhelminthopsis represents another superficially distinctive morphology that has been associated with Psammichnites. It can form when a relatively shallow burrow collapses, producing a broad surface furrow and obscuring much of the three-dimensional structure characteristic of deeper examples. It has consequently been evidenced as a preservational or morphological variant rather than necessarily representing a separate ichnogenus.

Psammichnites has five valid ichnospecies: P. gigas, P. grumula, P. implexus, P. plummeri, P. saltensis.

== Geological range ==
P. gigas

Psammichnites gigas is recorded from the Fortunian Stage of the Cambrian and continued through the Wuliuan Stage. Other ichnospecies also occurred in younger Palaeozoic strata, although post-Cambrian examples generally become shallower in tiers and may have more contorted and less smooth trajectories. The ichnogenus persisted until the end-Permian extinction.

== Palaeoecological significance ==
Psammichnites gigas is significant for understanding the development of early animal–sediment interactions before and during the Cambrian explosion. It represents one of the earliest examples of large-scale, complex horizontal bioturbation capable of penetrating several centimetres into the substrate and extending laterally over tens of metres.

The extensive horizontal movement of its tracemaker could have reworked large volumes of sediment and substantially modified the physical structure of the substrate.

During the Fortunian, shallow-marine ecosystems still commonly contained microbial mats characteristic of Ediacaran-type substrates. Extensive horizontal burrowing by Psammichnites would have disrupted these mats and increased sediment mixing. Such activity may have enhanced exchange of oxygen and nutrients between sediment and overlying water and altered the availability of resources for other organisms.

The abundance and distribution of Psammichnites in shallow, wave- and tide-influenced settings therefore suggest that its tracemakers were important early ecosystem engineers. Their activity, along with vertical burrows that appeared later in Cambrian Stage 2, represents an important component of the Cambrian substrate revolution that transitioned relatively mat-dominated Ediacaran-style substrates towards the more intensively bioturbated benthic ecosystems characteristic of the Phanerozoic.
