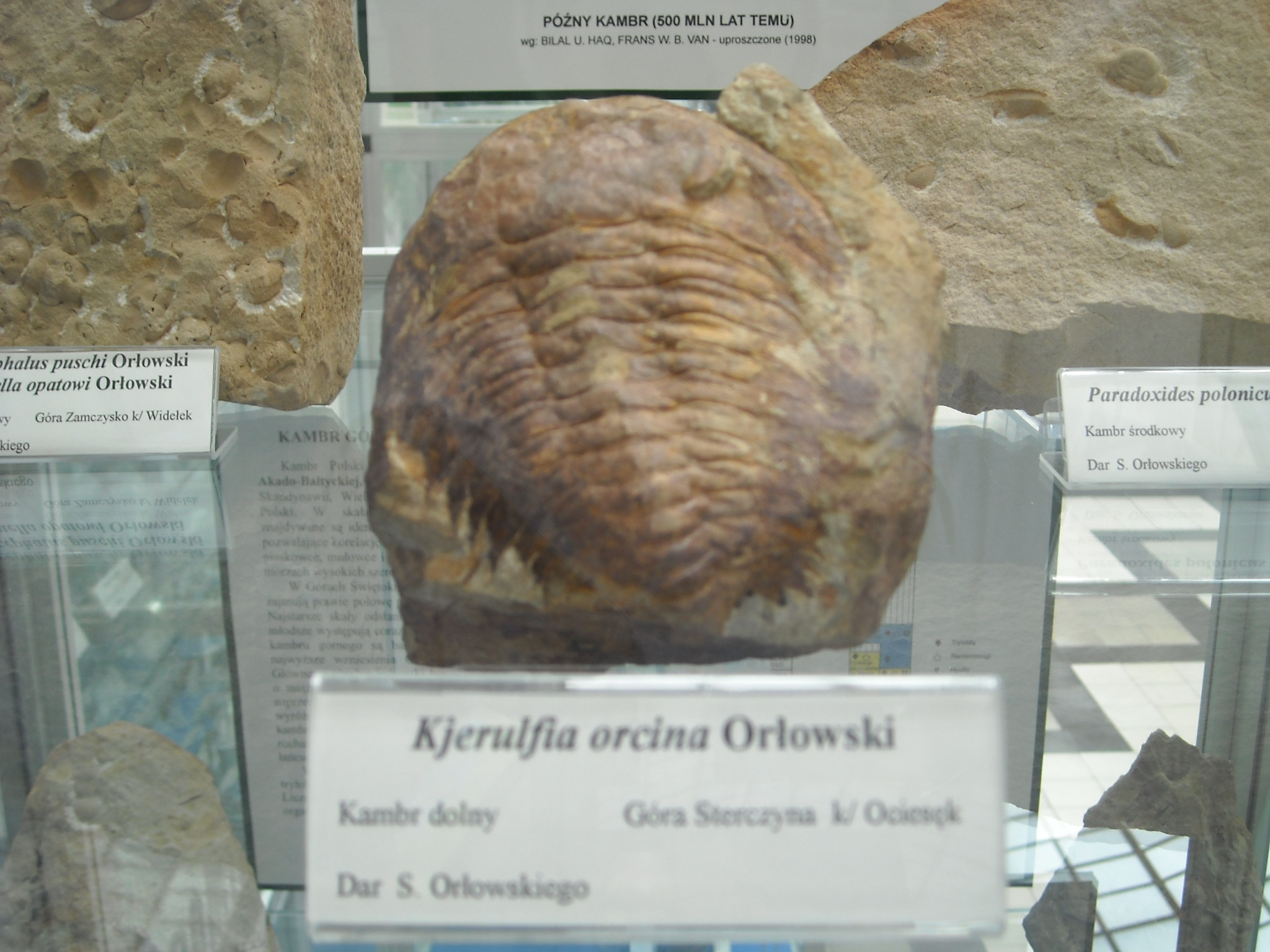
- Kjerulfia orcina

Scientific classification
- Kingdom: Animalia
- Phylum: Arthropoda
- Clade: †Artiopoda
- Class: †Trilobita
- Order: †Redlichiida
- Family: †Holmiidae
- Genus: †Kjerulfia; Kiaer, 1916

= Kjerulfia =

Extinct genus of trilobites

Kjerulfia is an extinct genus of trilobite in the family Holmiidae. There are at least two described species in Kjerulfia.

== Species ==
These two species belong to the genus Kjerulfia:

- † Kjerulfia lata Kiaer, 1917
- † Kjerulfia orienta (Orlowski, 1974)
