= Hyolithellus =

Hyolithellus Temporal range: Lower Cambrian – Middle Cambrian

Scientific classification
- Kingdom: Animalia
- Stem group: Annelida
- Genus: †Hyolithellus; Billings, 1871

Genus of annelids (fossil)

Hyolithellus is a conical tubular fossil from the Cambrian, originally considered a hyolith but since reinterpreted tentatively as a stem group annelid worm.

Its circular, thin (15–150 μm), originally phosphatic tube gets wider along its long, undulating, annulated length.
