= Palmettaspis =

Palmettaspis Temporal range: Cambrian Stage 3

Scientific classification
- Kingdom: Animalia
- Phylum: Arthropoda
- Clade: †Artiopoda
- Class: †Trilobita
- Order: †Redlichiida
- Family: †Holmiidae
- Genus: †Palmettaspis; Fritz, 1995

Extinct genus of trilobites

Palmettaspis is an extinct genus of trilobites in the order Redlichiida. There are at least two described species in Palmettaspis.

== Species ==
These two species belong to the genus Palmettaspis:

- † Palmettaspis consorta Fritz
- † Palmettaspis parallela Fritz
