= Esmeraldina =

Esmeraldina Temporal range: Late Atdabanian

Scientific classification
- Kingdom: Animalia
- Phylum: Arthropoda
- Clade: †Artiopoda
- Class: †Trilobita
- Order: †Redlichiida
- Family: †Holmiidae
- Genus: †Esmeraldina; Resser & Howell, 1938

Species
- E. elliptica Hollingsworth, 2006; E. rowei Walcott, 1910

Synonyms
- Grandinasus elliptica Hollingsworth, 2006

Extinct genus of trilobites

Esmeraldina is an extinct genus of holmiid trilobites. It lived during the late Atdabanian stage, which lasted from 530 to 524 million years ago during the early part of the Cambrian Period.
