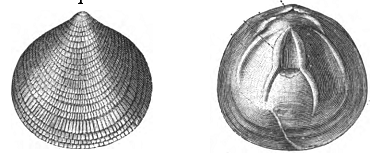
- O. crassa

Scientific classification
- Kingdom: Animalia
- Phylum: Brachiopoda
- Class: †Obolellata
- Order: †Obolellida
- Family: †Obolellidae
- Genus: †Obolella

= Obolella =

Extinct genus of brachiopods

Obolella is a genus of Cambrian brachiopods. From the lower Cambrain period (Atdabanian) around 530 to 524 million years ago. Fossils have been found in the United States, Canada, Greenland, Russia, Norway, China, Spain, and Australia.
