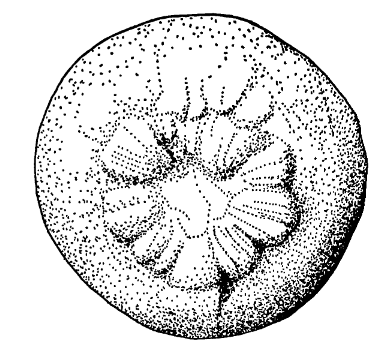
- Bergaueria radiata

Trace fossil classification
- Ichnogenus: †Bergaueria; Prantl, 1946

Type ichnospecies
- Bergaueria perata Prantl, 1946

Ichnospecies
- Bergaueria perata Prantl, 1945; Bergaueria langi (Hallam, 1960); Bergaueria radiata Alpert, 1973; Bergaueria hemispherica Crimes et al., 1977

Synonyms
- Kulindrichnus Hallam, 1960

= Bergaueria =

Bergaueria Temporal range: Ediacaran – Miocene

Fossil genus

Fossil of Bergaueria from the Urusis Formation

Bergaueria is an Ediacaran–Miocene trace fossil believed to represent the dwelling trace of Cnidarians (Actinia – sea anemones). It likely caused mixing and fluid exchange into the sediment (bioirrigation). Similar traces (Cheiichnus) can be made by rotational movement of arthropods.
