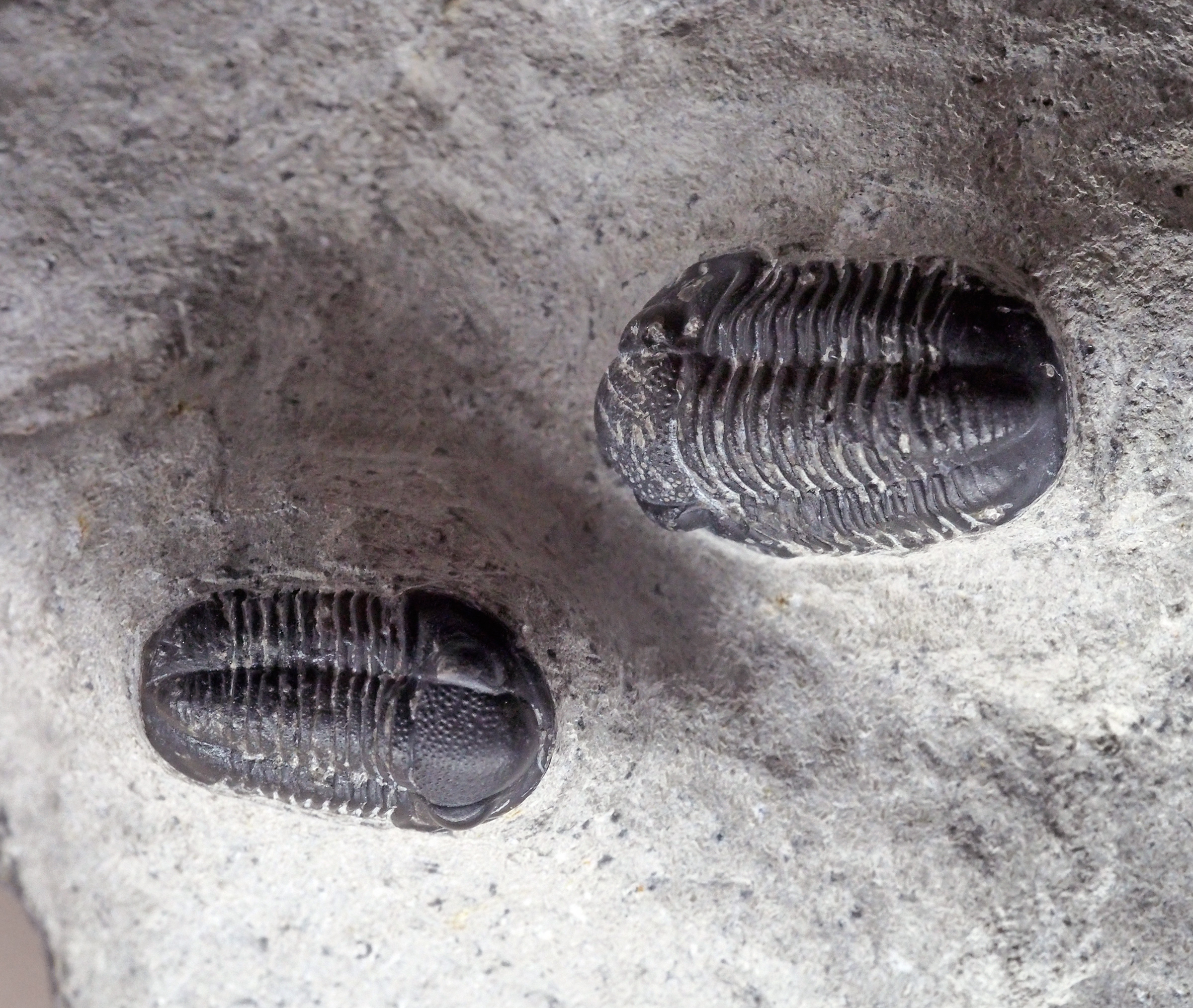
- Gerastos tuberculatus

Scientific classification
- Kingdom: Animalia
- Phylum: Arthropoda
- Clade: †Artiopoda
- Class: †Trilobita
- Order: †Proetida
- Superfamily: †Proetoidea; Hawle & Corda, 1847

= Proetoidea =

Proetoidea Temporal range: Ordovician–Lopingian

Extinct superfamily of trilobite

Proetoidea is a superfamily of trilobites in the order Proetida.

== Taxonomy ==
The Proetoidea are closely related to the Aulacopleuroidea. and are divided into three families: Phillipsiidae, Proetidae, and Tropidocophyridae.

Phillipsiidae is not listed in some publications (e. g. Adrain, 2011) but is instead listed as a subfamily of the Proetidae.

Family Phillipsiidae

- Acanthophillipsia
- Acropyge
- Ameropiltonia
- Ameura
- Ampulliglabella
- Anisopyge
- Archegonus
- Bedicella
- Breviphillipsia
- Carbonocoryphe
- Cummingella
- Delaria
- Ditomopyge
- Doublatia
- Endops
- Griffithidella
- Griffithides
- Grossoproetus
- Hentigia
- Hesslerides
- Hildaphillipsia
- Iranaspidion
- Jimbokranion
- Kathwaia
- Kollarcephalus
- Malchi
- Microphillipsia
- Neoproetus
- Nipponaspis
- Novoameura
- Nunnaspis
- Paraphillipsia
- Persiax
- Phillibole
- Phillipsia
- Piltonia
- Pseudophillipsia
- Simulopaladin
- Spinibole
- Thaiaspis
- Thigriffides
- Timoraspis
- Triproetus
- Vidria
- Weania

Family Proetidae

- Aayemenaytcheia
- Aceroproetus
- Alaskalethe
- Altajaspis
- Anambon
- Anglibole
- Angustibole
- Anujaspis
- Appendicysta
- Aprathia
- Archaeocoryphe
- Ascetopeltis
- Astroproetus
- Australokaskia
- Bailielloides
- Bapingaspis
- Basidechenella
- Beleckella
- Belgibole
- Benesovella
- Bitumulina
- Blodgettia
- Bohemiproetus
- Bolivicrania
- Boliviproetus
- Bollandia
- Bonnaspidella
- Borealia
- Brevibole
- Burgesina
- Calybole
- Camsellia
- Carbonoproetus
- Carlopsia
- Carniphillipsia
- Ceratoproetus
- Chauffouraspis
- Chaunoproetoides
- Chaunoproetus
- Chiides
- Chiops
- Chlupacula
- Chuanqianoproetus
- Clavibole
- Comptonaspis
- Coniproetus
- Conophillipsia
- Constantina
- Coombewoodia
- Craspedops
- Crassibole
- Crassiproetus
- Cyphinioides
- Cyphoproetus
- Cyrtodechenella
- Cyrtoproetus
- Cyrtosymbole
- Cystispina
- Daihuaia
- Dayinaspis
- Dechenella
- Dechenelloides
- Dechenellurus
- Deinoproetus
- Deltadechenella
- Diabole
- Diacoryphe
- Drevermannia
- Dudu
- Dushania
- Effops
- Ejinoproetus
- Elegenodechenella
- Elimaproetus
- Elliptophillipsia
- Engelomorrisia
- Ensecoryphe
- Eocyphinium
- Eocyrtosymbole
- Eodrevermannia
- Eomicrophillipsia
- Eopalpebralia
- Eosoproetus
- Eowinterbergia
- Erbenaspis
- Erbenites
- Evagena
- Exochops
- Flexidechenella
- Formonia
- Francenaspis
- Franconicabole
- Frithjofia
- Fuscinipyge
- Ganinella
- Gapeevella
- Geigibole
- Georhithronella
- Gerastos
- Gitarra
- Globusia
- Globusiella
- Globusoidea
- Gomiites
- Gracemerea
- Hassiabole
- Hedstroemia
- Helioproetus
- Helmutia
- Helokybe
- Humeia
- Humilogriffithides
- Hunanoproetus
- Hypaproetus
- Jinia
- Karginella
- Kaskia
- Kerpenella
- Khalfinella
- Kolymoproetus
- Kosovoproetus
- Krambedrysia
- Kulmiella
- Kulmogriffithides
- Lacunoporaspis
- Laevibole
- Langgonbole
- Latibole
- Latiglobusia
- Latiproetus
- Lauchellum
- Lichanocoryphe
- Linguaphillipsia
- Liobole
- Liobolina
- Longilobus
- Longiproetus
- Lophiokephalion
- Lugalella
- Luojiashania
- Macrobole
- Mahaiella
- Malayaproetus
- Mannopyge
- Megaproetus
- Menorcaspis
- Merebolina
- Metaphillipsia
- Mezzaluna
- Microspatulina
- Mirabole
- Monodechenella
- Moravocoryphe
- Moschoglossis
- Myoproetus
- Namuraspis
- Neogriffithides
- Neokaskia
- Nitidocare
- Nodiphillipsia
- Oehlertaspis
- Oidalaproetus
- Orbitoproetus
- Ormistonaspis
- Omlistonia
- Ormistoniella
- Osmolskia
- Otodechenella
- Paladin
- Palaeophillipsia
- Paleodechenella
- Palpebralia
- Panibole
- Parachaunoproetus
- Paradechenella
- Parafrithjofia
- Paraglobusia
- Paragriffithides
- Paramirabole
- Parangustibole
- Parapalpebralia
- Paraproetus
- Parawarburgella
- Particeps
- Parvidumus
- Paryfenus
- Pedinocoryphe
- Pedinodechenella
- Perexigupyge
- Perliproetus
- Phillibolina
- Philliboloides
- Phyllaspis
- Planilobus
- Planokaskia
- Plesiowensus
- Podoliproetus
- Pontipalpebralia
- Praedechenella
- Pragoproetus
- Prantlia
- Prodiacoryphe
- Proetocephalus
- Proetus
- Pseudobollandia
- Pseudocyrtosymbole
- Pseudodechenella
- Pseudodudu
- Pseudogerastos
- Pseudoproetus
- Pseudosilesiops
- Pseudospatulina
- Pseudowaribole
- Pudoproetus
- Pulcherproetus
- Pusillabole
- Raerinproetus
- Reediella
- Rhenocynproetus
- Rhenogriffides
- Richterella
- Rijckholtia
- Rosehillia
- Rugulites
- Schaderthalaspis
- Schizophillipsia
- Schizoproetina
- Schizoproetoides
- Schizoproetus
- Semiproetus
- Sevillia
- Silesiops
- Simaproetus
- Sinobole
- Sinocyrtoproetus
- Sinopaladin
- Sinoproetus
- Sinosymbole
- Skemmatocare
- Skemmatopyge
- Spatulata
- Spergenaspis
- Spinibolops
- Struveproetus
- Sulcubole
- Tawstockia
- Taynaella
- Tcherkesovia
- Tetinia
- Thaiaspella
- Thalabaria
- Thebanaspis
- Tropidocare
- Tschernyschewiella
- Typhloproetus
- Unguliproetus
- Vandergrachtia
- Vittaella
- Wagnerispina
- Waideggula
- Waigatchella
- Warburgella
- Waribole
- Weberiphillipsia
- Westropia
- Weyeraspis
- Winiskia
- Winterbergia
- Witryides
- Xenadoche
- Xenoboloides
- Xenocybe
- Xenodechenella
- Xiangzhongella
- Xiushuiproetus
- Yanshanaspis
- Yichangaspis
- Yishanaspis
- Yuanjia
- Zhegangula
- Zhejiangoproetus

Family Tropidocoryphidae

- Alberticoryphe
- Astycoryphe
- Bojocoryphe
- Buchiproetus
- Centriproetus
- Cornuproetus
- Cyrtosymboloides
- Dalarnepeltis
- Dalejeproetus
- Decoroproetus
- Denemarkia
- Diademaproetus
- Dipharangus
- Eopiriproetus
- Erbenicoryphe
- Eremiproetus
- Galbertianus
- Gracilocoryphe
- Gruetia
- Guilinaspis
- Ignoproetus
- Interproetus
- Koneprusites
- Krohbole
- Lardeuxia
- Laticoryphe
- Lepidoproetus
- Linguaproetus
- Lodenicia
- Longicoryphe
- Macroblepharum
- Miriproetus
- Nagaproetus
- Paraeremiproetus
- Paralardeuxia
- Paralepidoproetus
- Parvigena
- Perakaspis
- Phaetonellus
- Phaseolops
- Piriproetoides
- Piriproetus
- Pribylia
- Prionopeltis
- Prodrevermannia
- Proetina
- Proetopeltis
- Pterocoryphe
- Pteroparia
- Quadratoproetus
- Rabuloproetus
- Ranunculoproetus
- Remacutanger
- Richteraspis
- Rokycanocoryphe
- Sculptoproetus
- Slimanella
- Spinoproetus
- Stenoblepharum
- Tafilaltaspis
- Tropicoryphe
- Tropidocoryphe
- Vicinoproetus
- Voigtaspis
- Wolayella
- Xiphogonium
- Zetaproetus
