= P. mucronatus =

P. mucronatus may refer to:

- Paladin mucronatus, a species of trilobite
- Paretaxalus mucronatus, a species of beetle
