= Cyamella =

Cyamella may refer to:

- Cyamella (bone), a sesamoid bone in some primates
- Cyamella (trilobite), a genus of trilobites
