= Dovžan =

Dovžan may refer to:

- Dovžan Gorge in Slovenia
- Dovžan Gorge Formation in Slovenia
- Alenka Dovžan (born 1976), Slovene alpine skier
- Miha Dovžan (born 1994), Slovene biathlete
