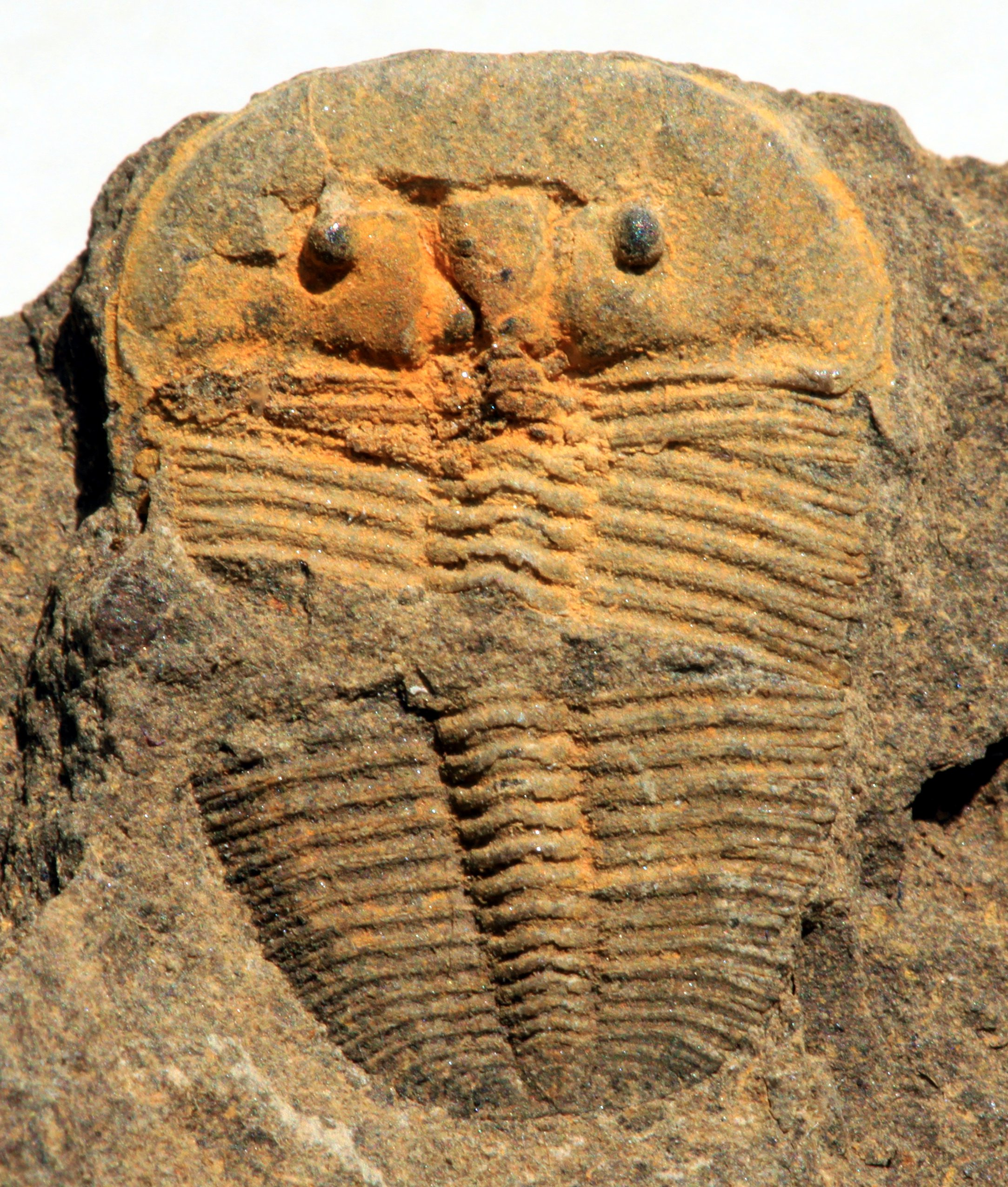
- Aulacopleura konincki, Kosov u Berouna, Czech Republic

Scientific classification
- Kingdom: Animalia
- Phylum: Arthropoda
- Clade: †Artiopoda
- Class: †Trilobita
- Subclass: †Librostoma
- Order: †Proetida; Fortey & Owens, 1975

Superfamilies
- See text

= Proetida =

Proetida Temporal range: Early Ordovician – End Permian

Extinct order of trilobites

Proetida is an order of trilobite that lived from the Ordovician to the Permian. It was the last surviving order of trilobite, dying out in the Permian-Triassic extinction event.

== Description ==
These typically small trilobites resemble those of the order Ptychopariida, from which the new order Proetida was separated in 1975 by Fortey and Owens. Like the order Phacopida, the proetids have exoskeletons that sometime have pits or small tubercles, especially on the glabella (middle portion of the head). Because of their resemblance to the Ptychopariida in some features, the proetids are included in the subclass Librostoma.

Unlike the trilobites of the phacopid suborder Phacopina, whose eyes are schizochroal, the proetids have the more common holochroal eyes. These eyes are characterized by close packing of biconvex lenses beneath a single corneal layer that covers all of the lenses. Each lens is generally hexagonal in outline and in direct contact with the others. They range in number from one to more than 15,000 per eye. Eyes are usually large, and because the individual lenses are hard to make out, they look smooth and sometimes bead-like.

The thorax of proetids was made up of anywhere between 8–22 segments, but most commonly 10. Many also extend the backcorners of the headshield into so-called genal spines. These two features can aid in distinguishing proetids from some phacopid trilobites in the suborder Phacopina, to which they can be very similar.

== Classification ==
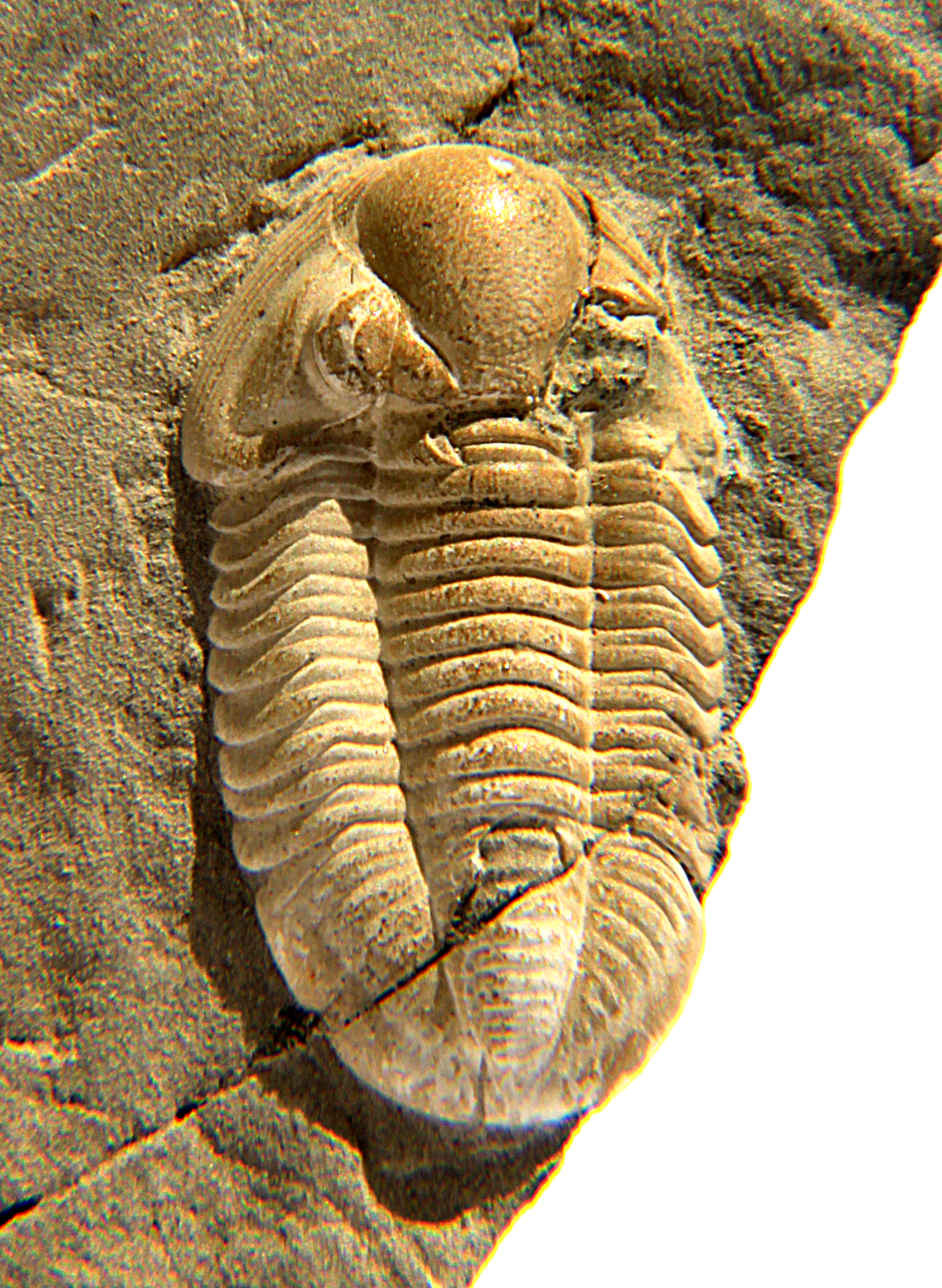
Cummingella belisama, 18 mm, Kohlenkalk Belgium

Opinions about the composition of and the affinities within the proetids, and to other trilobites, have been very divergent over time. In 2011 it was suggested to retain in Proetida only the families Proetidae and Tropidocoryphidae. The remainder of the families should be combined in a new proposed order, Aulacopleurida (Adrian, 2011), that would consist of the families Aulacopleuridae, Brachymetopidae, Dimeropygidae, Rorringtoniidae, Scharyiidae, Bathyuridae, Telephinidae, Holotrachelidae and Hystricuridae (considered Proetida before), combined with the Ptychopariid families Alokistocaridae, Crepicephalidae, Ehmaniellidae, Marjumiidae, Solenopleuridae and Tricrepicephalidae.

The reasoning for this proposed split is based on differences in early larval stages. While the remaining Proetida taxa have globular larvae very unlike the adult form, the Aulacopleurids have adultlike larvae with paired spines. Others observe that globular non-adult larvae also occur in some taxa within the proposed order Aulacopleurida. More recently phylogenetic analysis of both larval and adult characters suggests the proetids as earlier understood probably are monophyletic. Two larval characters are unique to all Proetida; the first is that the eye develops on the side of the headshield, not at the front, and the second is a forwardly tapering glabella that is distanced from the rim of the headshield.

The analysis identifies the taxa Asaphida, Olenina and Phacopida (including the Holotrachelidae) as sister groups. The earliest branch in Proetida is the family Hystricuridae. This is followed by a branch that consists of the families Dimeropygidae and Toernquistiidae. At the third node, the superfamily Aulacopleuroidea (consisting of Aulacopleuridae and Brachymetopidae) split off. The fourth branch is the family Scharyiidae. The fifth branch consists of the families Roringtoniidae and Tropidocoryphidae. The sixth node combines a restricted Bathyuridae split off from Bathyurella with the family Proetidae (including Phillipsiidae, which, according to Lamsdell, has been demoted to the subfamily Phillipsiinae).

== Taxonomy ==
The following superfamilies, families and genera are recognized:

=== Superfamily Aulacopleuroidea ===
Family Aulacopleuridae

- Aulacopleura
- Aulacopleuroides
- Beggaspis
- Chamaeleoaspis
- Coignops
- Cyphaspides
- Cyphaspis
- Dixiphopyge
- Harpidella
- Latecephalus
- Malimanaspis
- Maurotarion
- Namuropyge
- Otarion
- Otarionides
- Protocyphaspides
- Pseudotrinodus
- Songkania
- Tilsleyia

Family Brachymetopidae

- Acutimetopus
- Asiagena
- Australosutra
- Brachymetopella
- Brachymetopus
- Cheiropyge
- Conimetopus
- Cordania
- Eometopus
- Loeipyge
- Mystrocephala
- Proetidea
- Radnoria
- Spinimetopus

Family Rorringtoniidae

- Cyamella
- Hanjiangaspis
- Isbergia
- Madygenia
- Protarchaeogonus
- Rorringtonia
- Solariproetus

=== Superfamily Bathyuroidea ===
Family Bathyuridae

- Acidiphorus
- Aksuaspis
- Aponileus
- Bathyurellus
- Bathyurus
- Benthamaspis
- Bolbocephalus
- Catochia
- Ceratopeltis
- Eleutherocentrus
- Ermanella
- Gignopeltis
- Grinnellaspis
- Hadrohybus
- Jeffersonia
- Licnocephala
- Lutesvillia
- Madaraspis
- Peltabellia
- Petigurus
- Platyantyx
- ?Proscharyia
- Psephosthenaspis
- Pseudoolenoides
- Punka
- Rananasus
- Randaynia
- Raymondites
- Sinobathyurus
- Strigigenalis
- Uromystrum

Family Dimeropygidae (including Celmidae)

- Celmus
- Dimeropyge
- Dimeropygiella
- Glaphurella
- Ischyrotoma
- Pseudohystricurus

Family Holotrachelidae

- Holotrachelus
- Kinderlania

Family Hystricuridae

- Amblycranium
- Etheridgaspis
- Flectihystricurus
- Genalaticurus
- Glabretina
- Guizhouhystricurus
- Hillyardina
- Hintzecurus
- ?Holubaspis
- Hyperbolochilus
- Hystricurus
- Ibexicurus
- Lavadamia
- Nyaya
- Omuliovia
- Pachycranium
- Paenebeltella
- Parahystricurus
- Paraplethopeltis
- Politicurus
- Psalikilopsis
- Psalikilus
- Rollia
- Rossicurus
- Tanybregma
- ?Taoyuania
- Tasmanaspis
- Tersella

Family Raymondinidae? (including Glaphuridae) order placement considered uncertain by Adrain, 2011

- Glaphurina
- Glaphurus
- Raymondina
- Tagazella
- Varanella

Family Telephinidae

- Carolinites
- Fialoides
- Goniophrys
- Oopsites
- Opipeuterella
- Paraphorocephala
- Phorocephala
- ?Pyraustocranium
- Telephina
- Telephops

Family Toernquistiidae

- Chomatopyge
- Mesotaphraspis
- Toernquistia
- ?Toernquistina

=== Superfamily Proetoidea ===
Family Phillipsiidae

- Acanthophillipsia
- Acropyge
- Ameropiltonia
- Ameura
- Ampulliglabella
- Anisopyge
- Archegonus
- Bedicella
- Breviphillipsia
- Carbonocoryphe
- Cummingella
- Delaria
- Ditomopyge
- Endops
- Doublatia
- Griffithidella
- Griffithides
- Grossoproetus
- Hentigia
- Hesslerides
- Hildaphillipsia
- Iranaspidion
- Jimbokranion
- Kathwaia
- Kollarcephalus
- Malchi
- Microphillipsia
- Neoproetus
- Nipponaspis
- Novoameura
- Nunnaspis
- Paraphillipsia
- Persiax
- Phillibole
- Phillipsia
- Piltonia
- Pseudophillipsia
- Simulopaladin
- Spinibole
- Thaiaspis
- Thigriffides
- Timoraspis
- Triproetus
- Vidria
- Weania

Family Proetidae

- Aayemenaytcheia
- Aceroproetus
- Alaskalethe
- Altajaspis
- Anambon
- Anglibole
- Angustibole
- Anujaspis
- Appendicysta
- Aprathia
- Archaeocoryphe
- Ascetopeltis
- Astroproetus
- Australokaskia
- Bailielloides
- Bapingaspis
- Basidechenella
- Beleckella
- Belgibole
- Benesovella
- Bitumulina
- Blodgettia
- Bohemiproetus
- Bolivicrania
- Boliviproetus
- Bollandia
- Bonnaspidella
- Borealia
- Brevibole
- Burgesina
- Calybole
- Camsellia
- Carbonoproetus
- Carlopsia
- Carniphillipsia
- Ceratoproetus
- Chauffouraspis
- Chaunoproetoides
- Chaunoproetus
- Chiides
- Chiops
- Chlupacula
- Chuanqianoproetus
- Clavibole
- Comptonaspis
- Coniproetus
- Conophillipsia
- Constantina
- Coombewoodia
- Craspedops
- Crassibole
- Crassiproetus
- Cyphinioides
- Cyphoproetus
- Cyrtodechenella
- Cyrtoproetus
- Cyrtosymbole
- Cystispina
- Daihuaia
- Dayinaspis
- Dechenella
- Dechenelloides
- Dechenellurus
- Deinoproetus
- Deltadechenella
- Diabole
- Diacoryphe
- Drevermannia
- Dudu
- Dushania
- Effops
- Ejinoproetus
- Elegenodechenella
- Elimaproetus
- Elliptophillipsia
- Engelomorrisia
- Ensecoryphe
- Eocyphinium
- Eocyrtosymbole
- Eodrevermannia
- Eomicrophillipsia
- Eopalpebralia
- Eosoproetus
- Eowinterbergia
- Erbenaspis
- Erbenites
- Evagena
- Exochops
- Flexidechenella
- Formonia
- Francenaspis
- Franconicabole
- Frithjofia
- Fuscinipyge
- Ganinella
- Gapeevella
- Geigibole
- Georhithronella
- Gerastos
- Gitarra
- Globusia
- Globusiella
- Globusoidea
- Gomiites
- Gracemerea
- Hassiabole
- Hedstroemia
- Helioproetus
- Helmutia
- Helokybe
- Humeia
- Humilogriffithides
- Hunanoproetus
- Hypaproetus
- Jinia
- Karginella
- Kaskia
- Kerpenella
- Khalfinella
- Kolymoproetus
- Kosovoproetus
- Krambedrysia
- Kulmiella
- Kulmogriffithides
- Lacunoporaspis
- Laevibole
- Langgonbole
- Latibole
- Latiglobusia
- Latiproetus
- Lauchellum
- Lichanocoryphe
- Linguaphillipsia
- Liobole
- Liobolina
- Longilobus
- Longiproetus
- Lophiokephalion
- Lugalella
- Luojiashania
- Macrobole
- Mahaiella
- Malayaproetus
- Mannopyge
- Megaproetus
- Menorcaspis
- Merebolina
- Metaphillipsia
- Mezzaluna
- Microspatulina
- Mirabole
- Monodechenella
- Moravocoryphe
- Moschoglossis
- Myoproetus
- Namuraspis
- Neogriffithides
- Neokaskia
- Nitidocare
- Nodiphillipsia
- Oehlertaspis
- Oidalaproetus
- Orbitoproetus
- Ormistonaspis
- Omlistonia
- Ormistoniella
- Osmolskia
- Otodechenella
- Paladin
- Palaeophillipsia
- Paleodechenella
- Palpebralia
- Panibole
- Parachaunoproetus
- Paradechenella
- Parafrithjofia
- Paraglobusia
- Paragriffithides
- Paramirabole
- Parangustibole
- Parapalpebralia
- Paraproetus
- Parawarburgella
- Particeps
- Parvidumus
- Paryfenus
- Pedinocoryphe
- Pedinodechenella
- Perexigupyge
- Perliproetus
- Phillibolina
- Philliboloides
- Phyllaspis
- Planilobus
- Planokaskia
- Plesiowensus
- Podoliproetus
- Pontipalpebralia
- Praedechenella
- Pragoproetus
- Prantlia
- Prodiacoryphe
- Proetocephalus
- Proetus
- Pseudobollandia
- Pseudocyrtosymbole
- Pseudodechenella
- Pseudodudu
- Pseudogerastos
- Pseudoproetus
- Pseudosilesiops
- Pseudospatulina
- Pseudowaribole
- Pudoproetus
- Pulcherproetus
- Pusillabole
- Raerinproetus
- Reediella
- Rhenocynproetus
- Rhenogriffides
- Richterella
- Rijckholtia
- Rosehillia
- Rugulites
- Schaderthalaspis
- Schizophillipsia
- Schizoproetina
- Schizoproetoides
- Schizoproetus
- Semiproetus
- Sevillia
- Silesiops
- Simaproetus
- Sinobole
- Sinocyrtoproetus
- Sinopaladin
- Sinoproetus
- Sinosymbole
- Skemmatocare
- Skemmatopyge
- Spatulata
- Spergenaspis
- Spinibolops
- Struveproetus
- Sulcubole
- Tawstockia
- Taynaella
- Tcherkesovia
- Tetinia
- Thaiaspella
- Thalabaria
- Thebanaspis
- Tropidocare
- Tschernyschewiella
- Typhloproetus
- Unguliproetus
- Vandergrachtia
- Vittaella
- Wagnerispina
- Waideggula
- Waigatchella
- Warburgella
- Waribole
- Weberiphillipsia
- Westropia
- Weyeraspis
- Winiskia
- Winterbergia
- Witryides
- Xenadoche
- Xenoboloides
- Xenocybe
- Xenodechenella
- Xiangzhongella
- Xiushuiproetus
- Yanshanaspis
- Yichangaspis
- Yishanaspis
- Yuanjia
- Zhegangula
- Zhejiangoproetus

Family Tropidocoryphidae

- Alberticoryphe
- Astycoryphe
- Bojocoryphe
- Buchiproetus
- Centriproetus
- Cornuproetus
- Cyrtosymboloides
- Dalarnepeltis
- Dalejeproetus
- Decoroproetus
- Denemarkia
- Diademaproetus
- Dipharangus
- Eopiriproetus
- Erbenicoryphe
- Eremiproetus
- Galbertianus
- Gracilocoryphe
- Gruetia
- Guilinaspis
- Ignoproetus
- Interproetus
- Koneprusites
- Krohbole
- Lardeuxia
- Laticoryphe
- Lepidoproetus
- Linguaproetus
- Lodenicia
- Longicoryphe
- Macroblepharum
- Miriproetus
- Nagaproetus
- Paraeremiproetus
- Paralardeuxia
- Paralepidoproetus
- Parvigena
- Perakaspis
- Phaetonellus
- Phaseolops
- Piriproetoides
- Piriproetus
- Pribylia
- Prionopeltis
- Prodrevermannia
- Proetina
- Proetopeltis
- Pterocoryphe
- Pteroparia
- Quadratoproetus
- Rabuloproetus
- Ranunculoproetus
- Remacutanger
- Richteraspis
- Rokycanocoryphe
- Sculptoproetus
- Slimanella
- Spinoproetus
- Stenoblepharum
- Tafilaltaspis
- Tropicoryphe
- Tropidocoryphe
- Vicinoproetus
- Voigtaspis
- Wolayella
- Xiphogonium
- Zetaproetus
