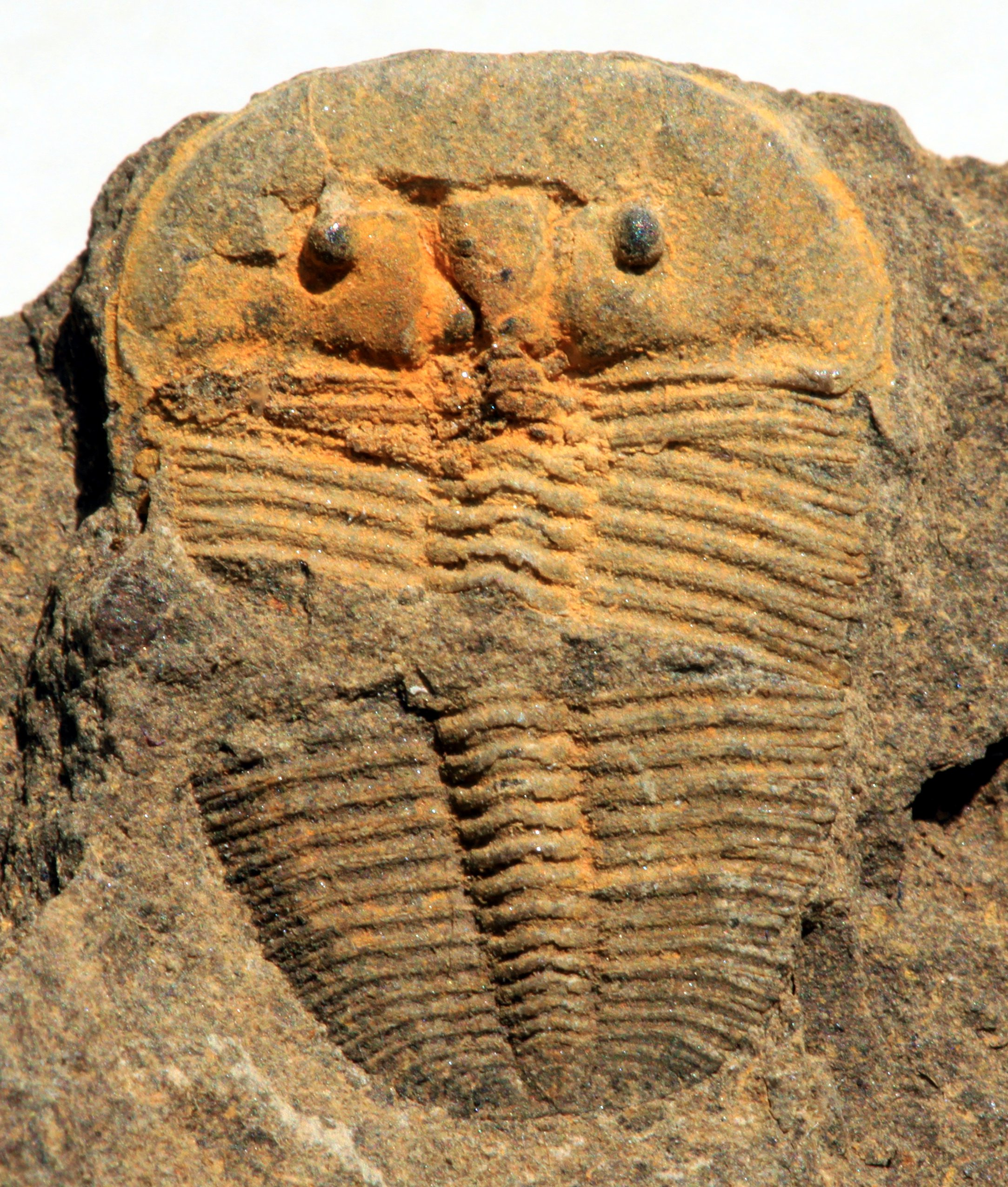
- Aulacopleura koninckii, Kosov u Berouna, Czech Republic

Scientific classification
- Kingdom: Animalia
- Phylum: Arthropoda
- Clade: †Artiopoda
- Class: †Trilobita
- Order: †Proetida
- Family: †Aulacopleuridae
- Genus: †Aulacopleura; Hawle & Corda, 1847

Type species
- †Arethusa koninckii Barrande, 1846

Species
- A. koninckii (Barrande, 1846); A. andersoni Adrian & Chatterton, 1995; A. krizi Šnajdr, 1975; A. letmathensis Basse & Lemke, 1996; A. pogsoni Edgecombe & Sherwin, 2001; A. sandfordi Edgecombe & Sherwin, 2001; A. wulongensis Wang, 1989

Synonyms
- Arethusa Barrande, 1846 non De Montfort, 1808, Arethusina Barrande, 1852

= Aulacopleura =

Aulacopleura Temporal range: Middle Ordovician to Middle Devonian

Extinct genus of trilobites

Aulacopleura is a genus of proetid trilobite that lived from the Middle Ordovician to the Middle Devonian. Some authors may classify this group as subgenus Otarion (Aulacopleura). The cephalon is semicircular or semielliptical, with border and preglabellar field. The glabella is short, with or without defined eye ridges connecting it with eyes of variable size. Spines at the rear outer corners of the cephalon (or genal spines) are present, typically reaching back to the 2nd to 4th thorax segment. The 'palate' (or hypostome) is not connected to the dorsal shield of the cephalon (or natant). The cephalon is pitted, or has small tubercles. The thorax has up to 22 segments. The pleural ends are usually rounded. The pygidium is small (micropygous), with an even margin. A. koninckii had a modern type of compound eye.

== Taxonomy ==
Barrande described Arethusa koninckii in 1846. However, Arethusa was occupied since it was used by De Montfort in 1808 for a foram protist. Barrande tried to correct this by proposing Arethusina as a replacement, but by that time that Hawle and Corda had already suggested Aulacopleura in 1847, which is thus the senior available name.

== Distribution ==
- A. andersoni Adrian & Chatterton, 1995 - from the Lower Silurian of Canada (Late Telychian, Upper Whittaker Formation, Mackenzie Mountains)
- A. koninckii is known from the Middle Silurian of the Czech Republic (Wenlockian, Liten Formation, Bohemia).
- A. krizi Snajdr, 1975 - Lower Silurian Bohemia (Želkovice formation, Beroun region, Central Bohemia)
- A. letmathensis has been found in the Middle Devonian of Germany (Givetian).
- A. pogsoni was collected from Lower Silurian of Australia (late Llandovery, upper Cotton Formation, near Forbes, New South Wales).
- A. wulongensis occurs in the Lower Silurian of China (Llandovery, Sichuan).)

== See also ==
- List of trilobites
- Trilobite Terminology

== Sources ==
- Trilobite info (Sam Gon III)
