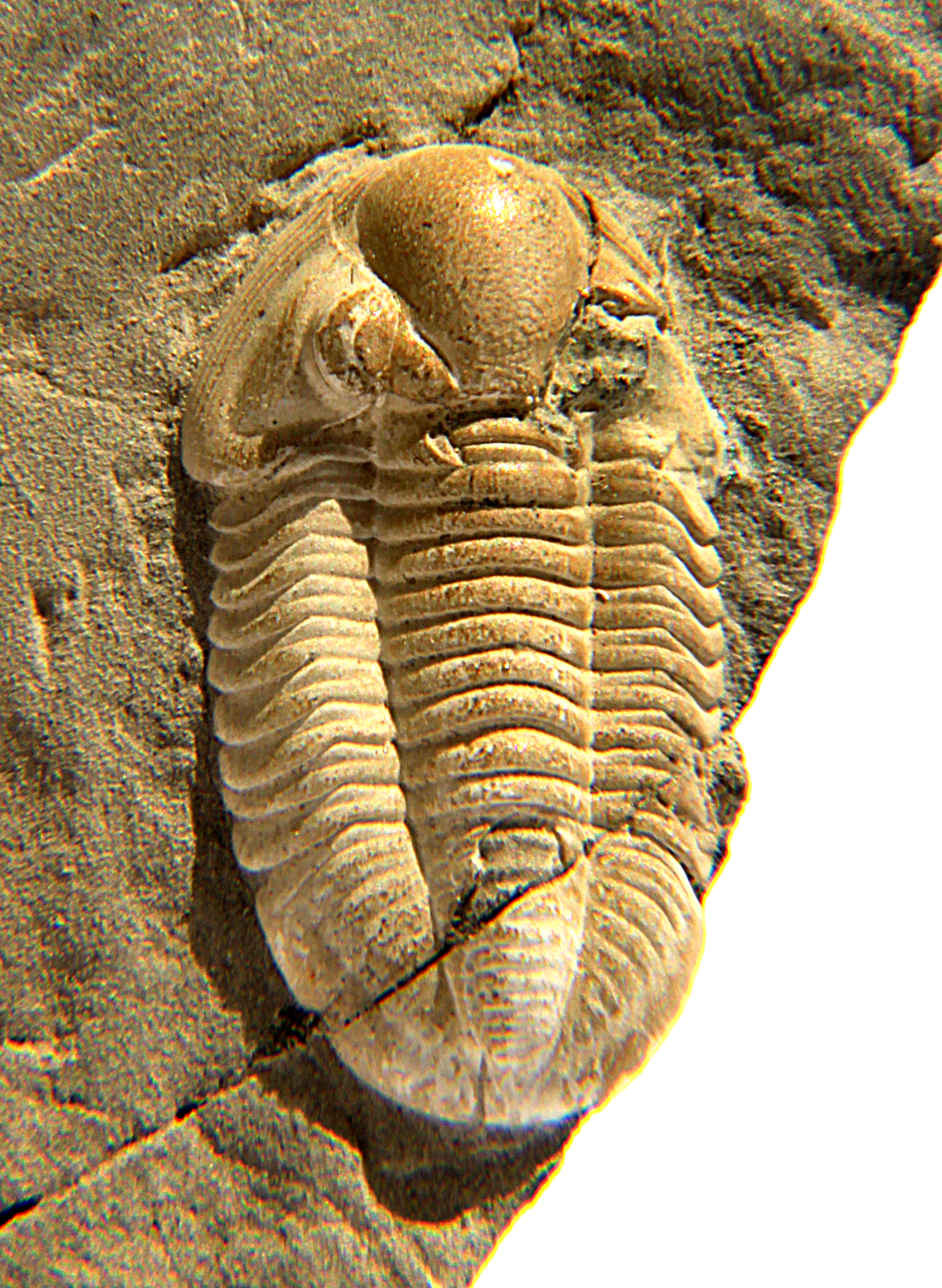
- Cummingella belisama, 18 mm

Scientific classification
- Kingdom: Animalia
- Phylum: Arthropoda
- Clade: †Artiopoda
- Class: †Trilobita
- Order: †Proetida
- Family: †Phillipsiidae
- Subfamily: †Cummingellinae; Hahn and Hahn, 1967

Genera
- Bedicella; Cummingella; Paraphillipsia; Persiax

= Cummingellinae =

Cummingellinae Temporal range: Tournaisian–Changhsingian

Subfamily of trilobites

Cummingellinae is a subfamily of trilobites in the family Phillipsiidae. They were common in shallow waters in the early Carboniferous of Europe. One of the last genera of trilobite, Paraphillipsia, was a cummingelline, making this group one of the last trilobites.
