= Dovžan Gorge Formation =

Geologic formation in Slovenia

- Stratigraphic range: Asselian; ~299–295 Ma
- Type: Formation

Lithology
- Primary: Limestone

Location
- Coordinates: 46°23′7″N 14°19′51″E
- Approximate paleocoordinates: 10.1°S 24.7°E
- Country: Slovenia
- Dovžan Gorge Formation (Slovenia)

The Dovžan Gorge Formation (Slovene: dovžanovosoteška formacija) is a geologic formation in Slovenia. It preserves fossils dating back to the Permian period. The formation is named after the Dovžan Gorge.

== Fossil content ==
The following fossils have been reported from the formation:

Trilobites

- Ditomopyge aff. kumpani
- Paraphillipsia aff. taurica
- Pseudophillipsia (Carniphillipsia) aff. caruancensis
- Neoproetus sp.
- Pseudophillipsia sp.

Brachiopods

- Capillomesolobus heritschi
