= Dimeropygiella =

Dimeropygiella Temporal range: Arenig

Scientific classification
- Kingdom: Animalia
- Phylum: Arthropoda
- Clade: †Artiopoda
- Class: †Trilobita
- Order: †Proetida
- Family: †Dimeropygidae
- Genus: †Dimeropygiella; Ross, 1951

Genus of arthropods (fossil)

Dimeropygiella is an extinct genus from a well-known class of fossil marine arthropods, the trilobites. It lived during the Arenig stage of the Ordovician Period, approximately 478 to 471 million years ago.
