= Hadrohybus =

Scientific classification
- Kingdom: Animalia
- Phylum: Arthropoda
- Clade: †Artiopoda
- Class: †Trilobita
- Order: †Proetida
- Family: †Bathyuridae
- Genus: †Hadrohybus; Raymond, 1925

Hadrohybus is an extinct genus of trilobites in the order Phacopida. It lived in Newfoundland during the Ordovician.
