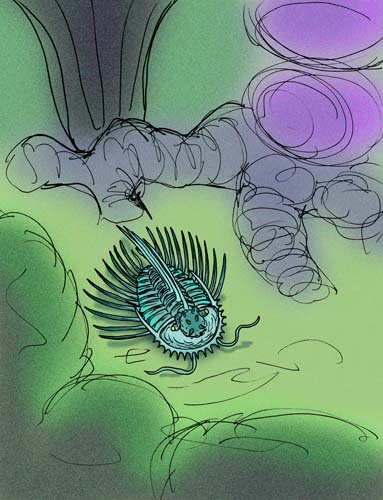
- C. chamaeleo

Scientific classification
- Kingdom: Animalia
- Phylum: Arthropoda
- Clade: †Artiopoda
- Class: †Trilobita
- Order: †Proetida
- Family: †Aulacopleuridae
- Genus: †Chamaeleoaspis; Basse, 2010

Type species
- Cyphaspis chamaeleo Basse, 1997

Species
- C. chamaeleo (Basse, 1997) type; C. lkomalii(Basse, 2007)

Synonyms
- Cyphaspis chamaeleo Basse, 1997; Otarionella chamaeleo(Basse, 1997); Otarionella lkomalii Basse, 2007

= Chamaeleoaspis =

Chamaeleoaspis Temporal range: Early to Middle Eifelian

Extinct genus of trilobites

Chamaeleoaspis is a genus of tiny trilobites found in Early to Middle Eifelian marine strata of Africa and Europe. The two species look very similar to the trilobites of the related genera Cyphaspis and Otarionella, in which the species were originally, successively classified in. Fossils of the older species, C. lkomalii, are found in a locality at the southern end of the Maider Basin, in the Anti-Atlas Mountains. Fossils of the type species, C. chamaeleo, are found in the Middle Eifelian-aged Ohle Formation in Endorf, Germany.
