= Tropidocoryphidae =

Tropidocoryphidae Temporal range: Darriwilian–Frasnian

Scientific classification
- Domain: Eukaryota
- Kingdom: Animalia
- Phylum: Arthropoda
- Class: †Trilobita
- Order: †Proetida
- Superfamily: †Proetoidea
- Family: †Tropidocoryphidae; Pribyl 1946

Extinct family of trilobites

Tropidocoryphidae is an extinct family of trilobites in the order Proetida.

== Genera ==
These 44 genera belong to the family Tropidocoryphidae:

- Aidynsaia Owens & Ivanova, 2010
- Alberticoryphe Erben, 1966
- Astycoryphe Richter 1919
- Bojocoryphe Snajdr, 1976
- Buchiproetus Pillet, 1969
- Centriproetus Snajdr, 1977
- Cirriticeps Holloway, 2013
- Cornuproetus Richter & Richter 1919
- Cyrtosymboloides Alberti, 1967
- Dalejeproetus Snajdr, 1977
- Denemarkia Pribyl 1946
- Diademaproetus Alberti, 1964
- Eopiriproetus Alberti, 1966
- Galbertianus Özdikmen, 2006
- Ignoproetus Snajdr, 1977
- Interproetus Snajdr 1977
- Koneprusites Pribyl 1964
- Lepidoproetus Erben, 1951
- Lodenicia Prantl & Vanek, 1958
- Macroblepharum Alberti, 1964
- Metaxaphorus Owens & Ivanova, 2010
- Miriproetus Snajdr, 1977
- Nagaproetus Snajdr, 1977
- Phaetonellus Novák, 1890
- Piriproetus Erben, 1952
- Pribylia
- Prionopeltis Hawle & Corda 1847
- Prodrevermannia Alberti, 1964
- Proetina Pribyl, 1946
- Proetopeltis Pribyl 1965
- Pteroparia Richter, 1913
- Quadratoproetus Alberti, 1967
- Rabuloproetus Snajdr, 1977
- Ranunculoproetus Snajdr, 1977
- Rokycanocoryphe Pribyl & Vanek, 1987
- Sculptoproetus Erben 1951
- Stenoblepharum Owens, 1973
- Tafilaltaspis Alberti, 1966
- Tropicoryphe Snajdr, 1977
- Tropidocoryphe Novák, 1890
- Vicinoproetus Alberti, 1967
- Voigtaspis Alberti, 1967
- Wolayella Erben, 1966
- Xiphogonium Hawle & Corda, 1847
