= Bolbocephalus =

Bolbocephalus Temporal range: Early Arenig

Scientific classification
- Kingdom: Animalia
- Phylum: Arthropoda
- Clade: †Artiopoda
- Class: †Trilobita
- Order: †Proetida
- Family: †Bathyuridae
- Subfamily: †Bathyurinae
- Genus: †Bolbocephalus; Whitfield, 1890

Type species
- Bathyurus seelyi Whitfield, 1886

Other species
- B. angustisulcatus Poulsen, 1927; B. convexus (Billings, 1865); B. ellesmerensis Adrain & Westrop, 2005; B. groenlandicus Poulsen, 1937; B. gunnari Fortey & Bruton, 2013; B. jeffersonensis Cullison, 1944; B. kindlei Boyce, 1989; B. stclairi Cullison, 1944; B. stevensi Boyce, 1989

Genus of trilobites

Bolbocephalus is a genus of proetid trilobites in the family Bathyuridae. Species lived during the early part of the Arenig stage of the Ordovician Period, a faunal stage which lasted from approximately 478 to 471 million years ago, in marine strata of the United States, Canada, and Greenland.
