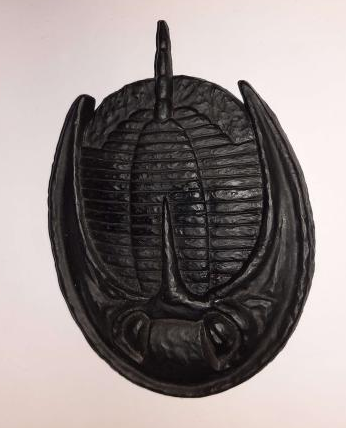
- Replica specimen

Scientific classification
- Kingdom: Animalia
- Phylum: Arthropoda
- Clade: †Artiopoda
- Class: †Trilobita
- Order: †Proetida
- Family: †Bathyuridae
- Genus: †Raymondites; Sinclair, 1944

= Raymondites =

Raymondites Temporal range: Late Ordovician, Sandbian–Katian

Extinct genus of bathyurid trilobites

Raymondites is an extinct genus of bathyurid trilobites that lived during the Late Ordovician and is known from Canada and the U.S. It may have been a subgenus of Bathyurus.
