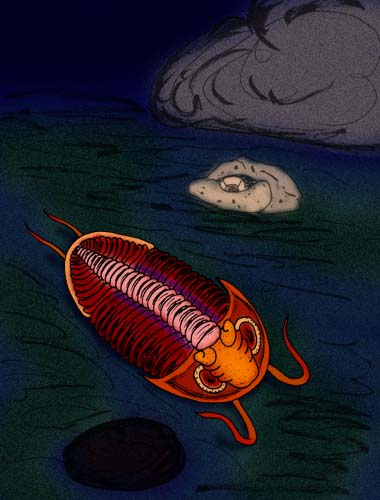
- Artist's reconstruction

Scientific classification
- Domain: Eukaryota
- Kingdom: Animalia
- Phylum: Arthropoda
- Class: †Trilobita
- Order: †Proetida
- Family: †Proetidae
- Genus: †Aayemenaytcheia; Lieberman, 1994
- Species: †A. paragranulata

Binomial name
- †Aayemenaytcheia paragranulata (Ormiston, 1967)

Synonyms
- Dechenella paragranulata Ormiston, 1967

= Aayemenaytcheia =

Aayemenaytcheia Temporal range: 407–392 Ma Emsian-Eifelian

Extinct genus of trilobites

Aayemenaytcheia paragranulata is a Middle Devonian proetid trilobite.

== Etymology ==
The genus name is the vocalisation of the acronym AMNH of the American Museum of Natural History and the suffix -ia (Aay-Em-En-Aytche-ia), as gratitude for funding Lieberman's research. The species epithet paragranulata refers to the fact that the species was first regarded as closely related to Dechenella granulata.

== Distribution ==
A. paragranulata has been collected from the Devonian of Canada (Emsian and Eifelian, Blue Fjord Formation, Bathurst Island, Nunavut).

== Taxonomy ==
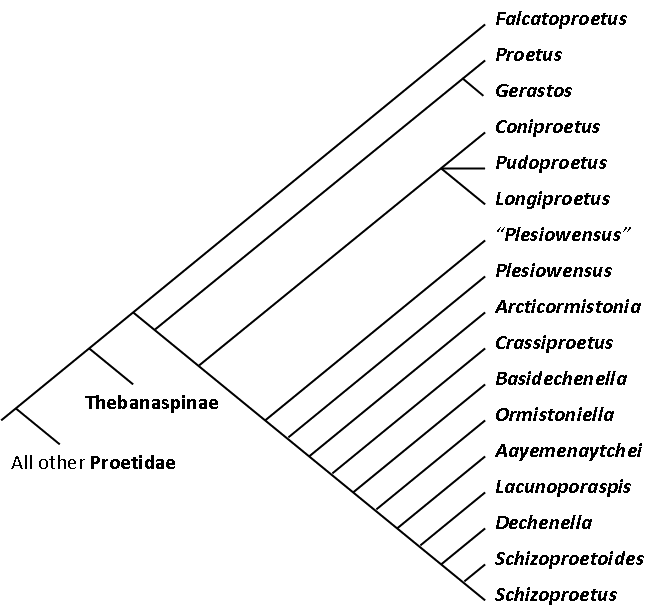
Cladogram of the genera of the subfamily Proetinae, according to Lieberman, 1994, figures 5 and 6

Aayemenaytcheia paragranulata was originally described as a species belonging to the genus Dechenella. Recent cladistic analysis however makes it likely the species is in fact the earliest branch of a clade that further includes Lacunoporaspis, Dechenella, Schizoproetus and Schizoproetoides. So in order to retain the monophyly of the genus Dechenella, a new genus was erected for D. paragranulata.
