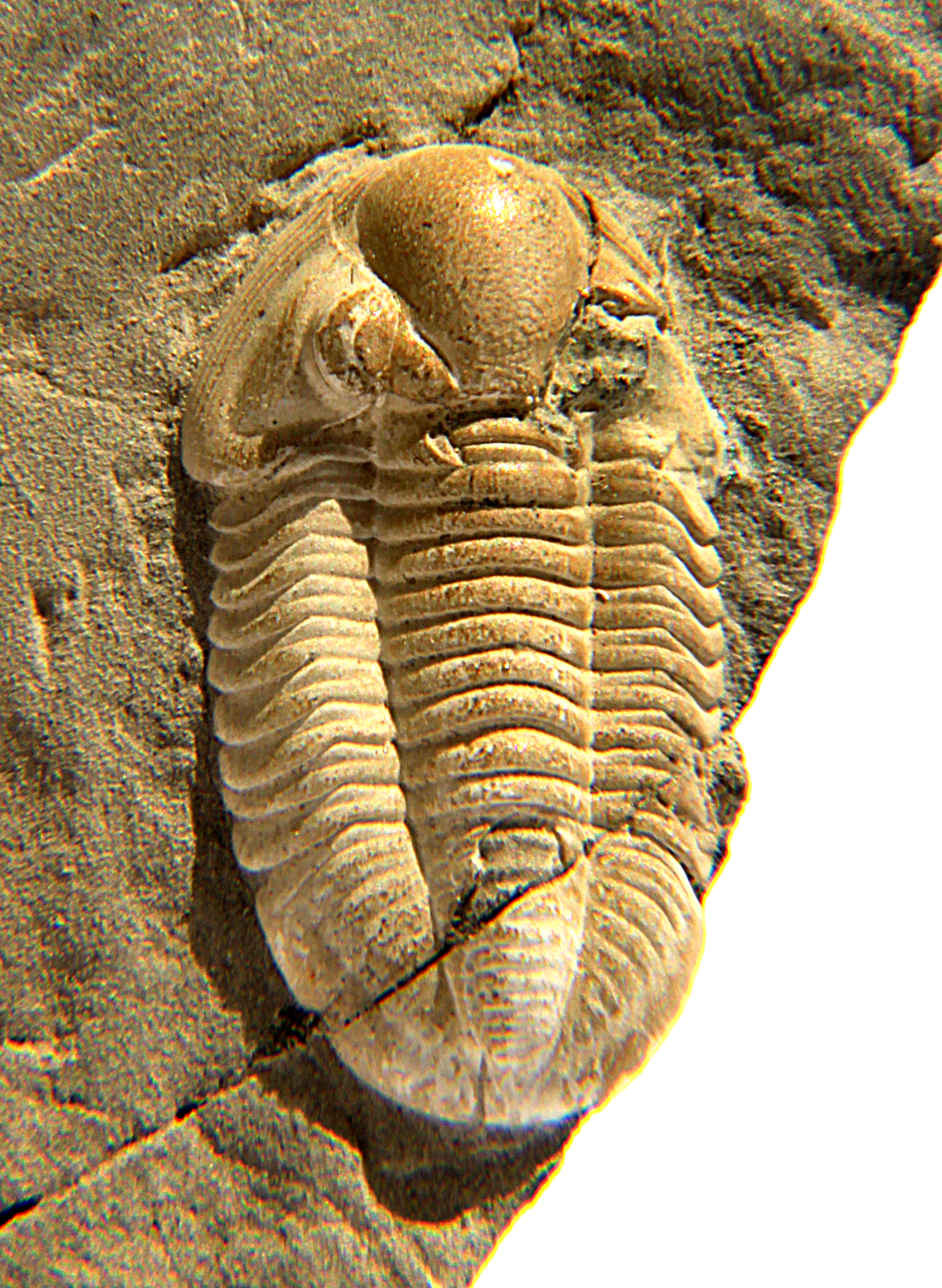
- Cummingella belisama, 18 mm

Scientific classification
- Kingdom: Animalia
- Phylum: Arthropoda
- Clade: †Artiopoda
- Class: †Trilobita
- Order: †Proetida
- Family: †Phillipsiidae
- Subfamily: †Cummingellinae
- Genus: †Cummingella; Reed, 1942

Type species
- Phillipsia jonesii Portlock, 1843

Species
- C. jonesii (Portlock, 1843) (type), = Phillipsia jonesii; C. arbizui Hahn, Hahn & Rabano, 1996; C. auge Hahn & Hahn, 1968; C. belisama Hahn, Hahn & Brauckmann, 1985; C. boikoi Mychko, 2012; C. carringtonensis (Woodward, 1884); C. raniceps; C. sampsoni Tilsley, 1988; C. slovenica Hahn, Hahn & Ramovs, 1990

= Cummingella =

Cummingella Temporal range: Early Carboniferous-Early Permian 360–290 Ma

Genus of trilobites

Cummingella is a genus of proetid trilobite in the family Phillipsiidae that lived from the earliest Carboniferous until the last species' extinction in the Middle Permian. Fossils have been found in corresponding marine strata of western Europe, the United Kingdom, and the United States.

== Distribution ==
- C. arbizui was found in the Lower Carboniferous of Spain (Tournaisian, Perna Formation, 1.450 m SSE of Cerro de Perna, 5 km SE of Aliseda, Cáceres).
- C. auge, C. carringtonensis, C. insulae, and C. tuberculigenata occur at the Lower Carboniferous of the United Kingdom (Asbian, Bee Low Limestones Formation, Treak Cliff, England).
- C. auge was excavated from the earliest Carboniferous of the Czech Republic (Tournaisian, Scaliognathus anchoralis-conodont zone, Brezina Formation, near Mokra village) and Germany (Tournaisian, Erdbach Limestone Formation, quarry at north-western margin of Steeden, Hessen; and quarry and slope at the Iberg-Winterberg, Bad Grund, Harz, Lower Saxony).
- C. belisama is present in the Lower Carboniferous of Belgium (Tournaisian; Carrières Gauthier-Wincqz Soignies, Carrières Cimescaut, Antoing, Modave Shale, Huy, Carrière do Clypot, Neufville-lez-Soignies; Hainaut) and the Netherlands (IJburg, Amsterdam).
- C. boikoi is known from the Lower Permian of the Russian Federation (Sakmarian, Tastuba quarry, Voznesenka, Bashkortostan).
- C. carringtonensis has been found in the Lower Carboniferous of Belgium (Viséan; Tournaisian, Heibaart, Louenhout), Germany (Velbert "Am Wasserfall"). and the United Kingdom (Asbian, Hopedale Limestones Formation, Gateham Hill, England; and Benburb type section (Viséan, Gorestown Mudstone Member, Blackstokes Limestone Formation, Northern Ireland).
- C. jonesii comes from earliest Carboniferous of France (Tournaisian, Mitzach, Southern Vosges, Alsace) and Germany (Ratingen; Sondern, quarry east of Sondern).
- C. laticaudata occurs in the Lower Carboniferous of the United Kingdom (Viséan, Monsal Dale Limestones Formation, Mich Low, England).
- C. raniceps is present in the Carboniferous of the United Kingdom (Visean, Milldale Limestone Formation, Thorpe Cloud, England).
- C. slovenica occurs in the Lower Permian of Slovenia (Asselian, Dovžan Gorge Formation, Na Peceh, north of Jesenice, Karawanks).

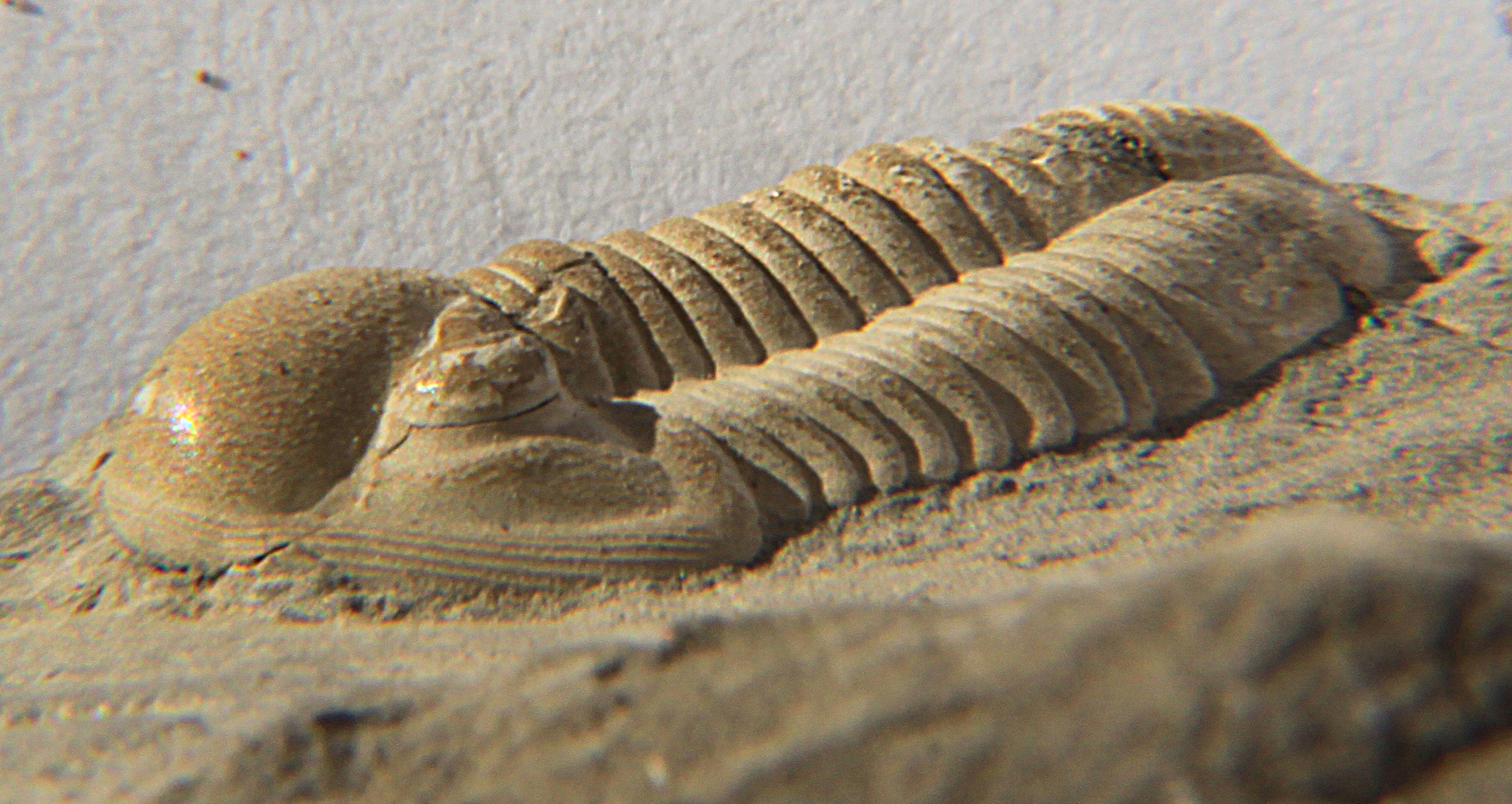
Lateral view of Cummingella belisama

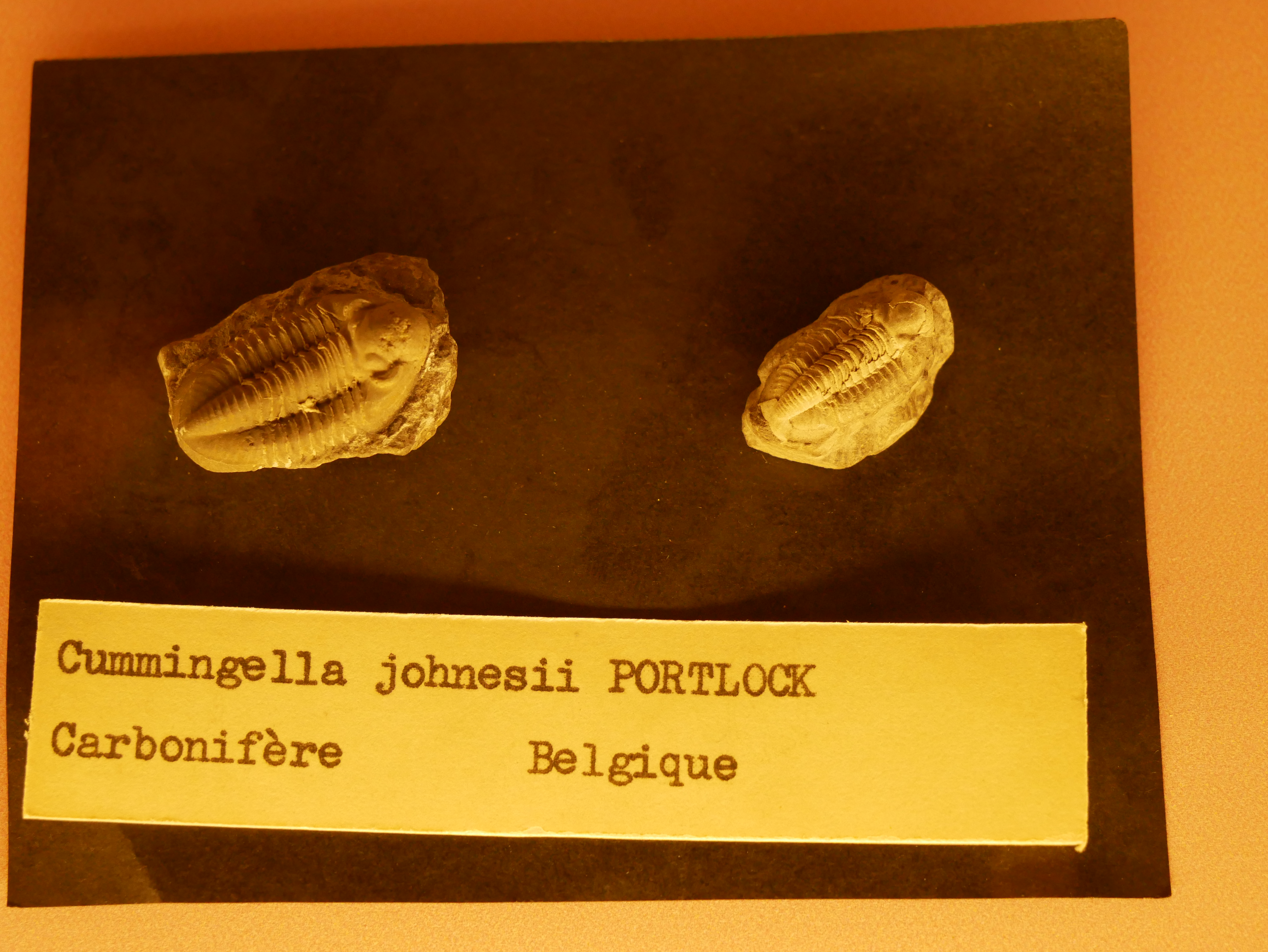
Cummingella jonesii fossils, National Museum of Natural History, France

== Taxonomy ==
C. zephyr = Bedicella zephyr
