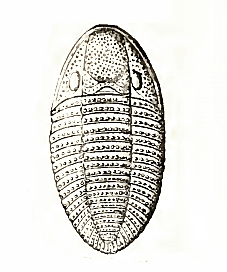
- Eocyphinium seminiferum

Scientific classification
- Domain: Eukaryota
- Kingdom: Animalia
- Phylum: Arthropoda
- Class: †Trilobita
- Order: †Proetida
- Family: †Proetidae
- Genus: †Dechenella; Reed, 1942

= Eocyphinium =

Eocyphinium Temporal range: 345.3–326.4 Ma

Extinct genus of trilobites

Eocyphinium is an extinct genus of trilobite from the Carboniferous.

== Sources ==
- Fossils (Smithsonian Handbooks) by David Ward (Page 65)
