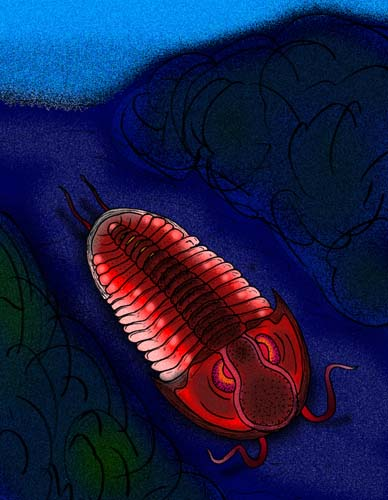
- Artist's reconstruction

Scientific classification
- Kingdom: Animalia
- Phylum: Arthropoda
- Clade: †Artiopoda
- Class: †Trilobita
- Order: †Proetida
- Family: †Phillipsiidae
- Subfamily: †Weaniinae
- Genus: †Endops; Koizumi, 1972
- Species: †E. yanagisawai

Binomial name
- †Endops yanagisawai (Endo & Matsumoto 1962)

Synonyms
- Paladin yanagisawai Endo & Matsumoto 1962

= Endops =

Endops Temporal range: 265–259 Ma Capitanian

Genus of trilobites

Endops yanagisawai is a proetid trilobite belonging to the family Proetidae, endemic to Middle Permian-aged marine strata in Fukushima Prefecture, Japan. It was originally described by Riuji Endo as Paladin yanagisawai.
