= Paretaxalus =

Scientific classification
- Kingdom: Animalia
- Phylum: Arthropoda
- Class: Insecta
- Order: Coleoptera
- Suborder: Polyphaga
- Infraorder: Cucujiformia
- Family: Cerambycidae
- Tribe: Pteropliini
- Genus: Paretaxalus

Genus of beetles

Paretaxalus is a genus of longhorn beetles of the subfamily Lamiinae, containing the following species:

- Paretaxalus mucronatus (Schwarzer, 1931)
- Paretaxalus sandacanus Breuning, 1938
