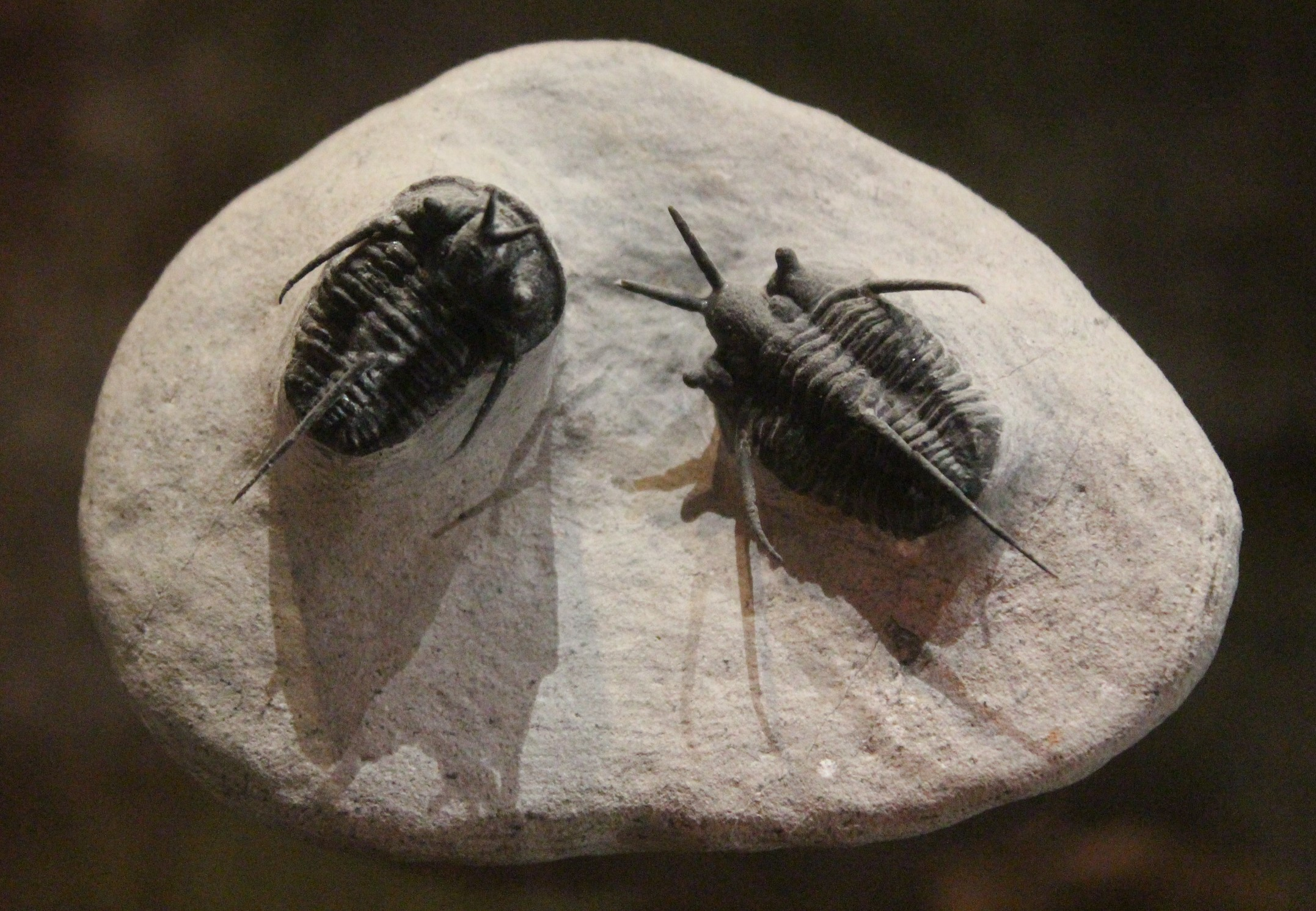
- Cyphaspis sp. from Morocco

Scientific classification
- Kingdom: Animalia
- Phylum: Arthropoda
- Clade: †Artiopoda
- Class: †Trilobita
- Order: †Proetida
- Family: †Aulacopleuridae
- Genus: †Cyphaspis; Burmeister 1843

Type species
- Phacops ceratophthalma Goldfuss 1843

Species
- See text

= Cyphaspis =

Cyphaspis Temporal range: Late Ordovician-Late Devonian

Extinct genus of trilobites

Cyphaspis is a genus of small, proetid trilobite that lived from the Late Ordovician to the Late Devonian. Fossils have been found in marine strata in what is now Europe, Africa and North America. Various species had a compact body, and a large, bulbous glabellum. Many species had long spines arranged similarly to closely related genera, such as Otarian, Otarionella, Chamaeleoaspis, and Namuropyge.

== Species ==
The following species in the genus Cyphaspis have been described:

- C. anticostiensis
- C. bellula
- C. bluhmi Van Viersen & Holland, 2016
- C. boninoi Van Viersen & Holland, 2016
- C. bowingensis
- C. buchbergeri Adrain & Chatterton, 1996
- C. burmeisteri
- C. ceratophthalma Goldfuss, 1843 (type)
- C. ceratophthalmoides
- C. clintoni
- C. coelebs
- C. convexa
- C. craspedota
- C. dereimsi
- C. diadema
- C. eximia Van Viersen & Holland, 2016
- C. foumzguidensis Van Viersen & Holland, 2016
- C. gaultieri
- C. globosus
- C. heisingi Van Viersen & Holland, 2016
- C. hoepfneri
- C. hudsonica
- C. hybrida
- C. hydrocephala
- C. ihmadii Van Viersen & Holland, 2016
- C. insolata Van Viersen, Taghon & Magrean, 2019
- C. iuxta Van Viersen, Taghon & Magrean, 2019
- C. juergenhollandi Van Viersen & Holland, 2016
- C. khraidensis Van Viersen & Holland, 2016
- C. kippingi Van Viersen & Holland, 2016
- C. koimeterionensis Van Viersen & Vanherle, 2018
- C. kweberi Van Viersen & Holland, 2016
- C. lerougei Van Viersen & Holland, 2016
- C. lowei Adrain & Chatterton, 1996
- C. mactavishi Adrain & Chatterton, 1996
- C. maharchensis Van Viersen & Holland, 2016
- C. matulina
- C. megalops
- C. minuscula
- C. munii Adrain & Chatterton, 1996
- C. partim
- C. parvula
- C. planifrons
- C. punctillosa
- C. raripustulosus
- C. sibirica Schmidt, 1886
- C. smeenki Van Viersen & Holland, 2016
- C. spinulocervix
- C. spryi
- C. stephanophora
- C. stigmatopthalmus
- C. tadachachtensis Van Viersen & Holland, 2016
- C. trentonensis
- C. trigoda
- C. walteri
- C. yassensis

== Distribution ==
Fossils of Cyphaspis have been found in:

Devonian

Colombia (Floresta Formation, Altiplano Cundiboyacense), the Czech Republic, Morocco, United States (Alaska, Iowa, Oklahoma), and Uzbekistan

Silurian

Canada (Northwest Territories, Nunavut, Ontario), the United Kingdom, and the United States (Indiana, New York, Tennessee)

Ordovician

Sweden, and the United States (Illinois, Kentucky, Missouri)
