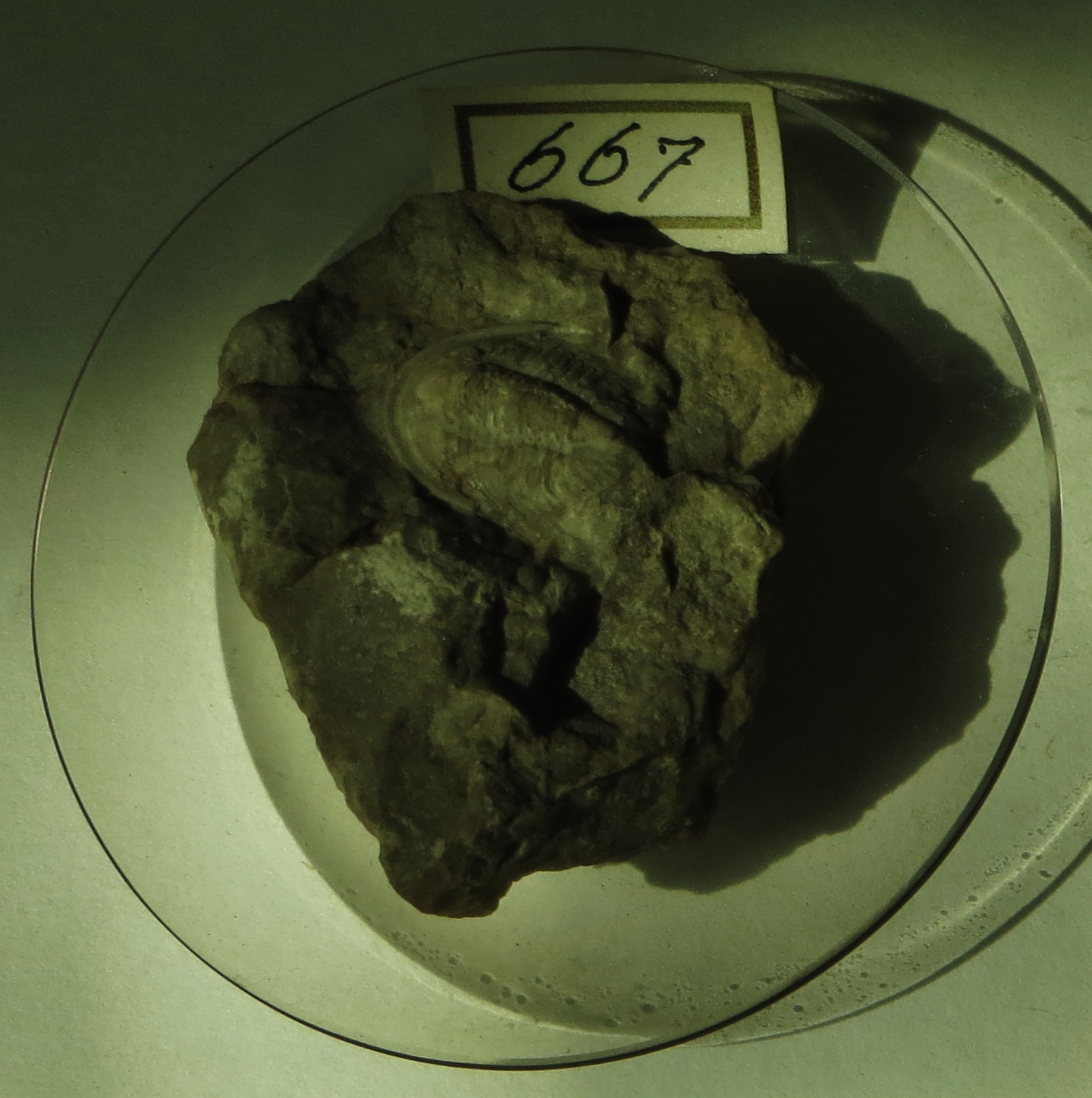

Scientific classification
- Kingdom: Animalia
- Phylum: Arthropoda
- Clade: †Artiopoda
- Class: †Trilobita
- Order: †Proetida
- Family: †Tropidocoryphidae
- Genus: †Cornuproetus; Richter & Richter, 1919

= Cornuproetus =

Extinct genus of trilobites

Cornuproetus is a genus of trilobite in the family Tropidocoryphidae.

Cornuproetus lived 390-360 MYA in the Devonian period. Cornuproetus possessed two long genals, which protruded from its Cephalon. It also had two eyes on its Cephalon. The remains of Cornuproetus are commonly found throughout North America, Africa, and Europe.
