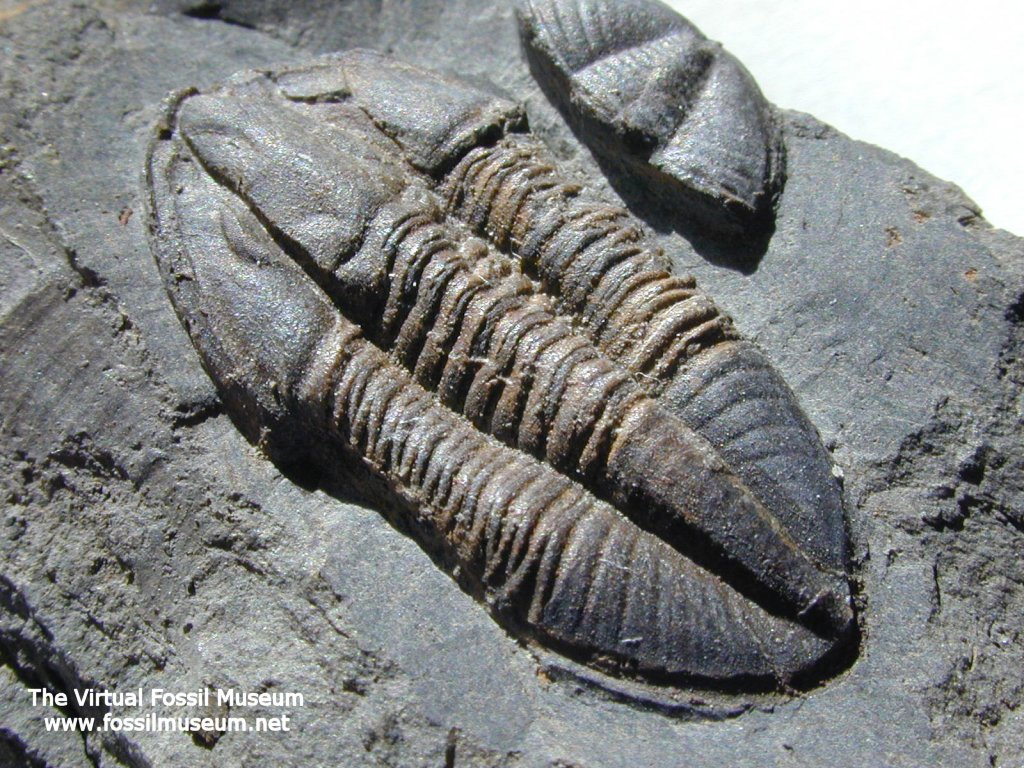
- A fossil of Archegonus nehdenensis

Scientific classification
- Kingdom: Animalia
- Phylum: Arthropoda
- Clade: †Artiopoda
- Class: †Trilobita
- Order: †Proetida
- Family: †Phillipsiidae
- Subfamily: †Archegoninae
- Genus: †Archegonus; Burmeister, 1843

= Archegonus =

Archegonus Temporal range: 388.1–326.4 Ma Middle Devonian-Carboniferous

Extinct genus of trilobites

Archegonus is a genus of proetid trilobite that was endemic from the Middle Devonian period to the Carboniferous period in Europe and Southern China.

== Species ==
- †A. aequalis
- †A. antecedens
- †A. aprathensis
- †A. artaios
- †A. aspinosus
- †A. barriensis
- †A. brevispina
- †A. cantabricus
- †A. cauliquercus
- †A. conicus
- †A. crameri
- †A. culmicus
- †A. felmensis
- †A. glabratesta
- †A. longisuta
- †A. merensis
- †A. micropthalmus
- †A. nehdenensis Hahn & Hahn, 1969
- †A. semiplanus
- †A. tevergensis
- †A. truyolsi
- †A. winterbergensis Hahn 1965
