= Želkovice =

- Municipality
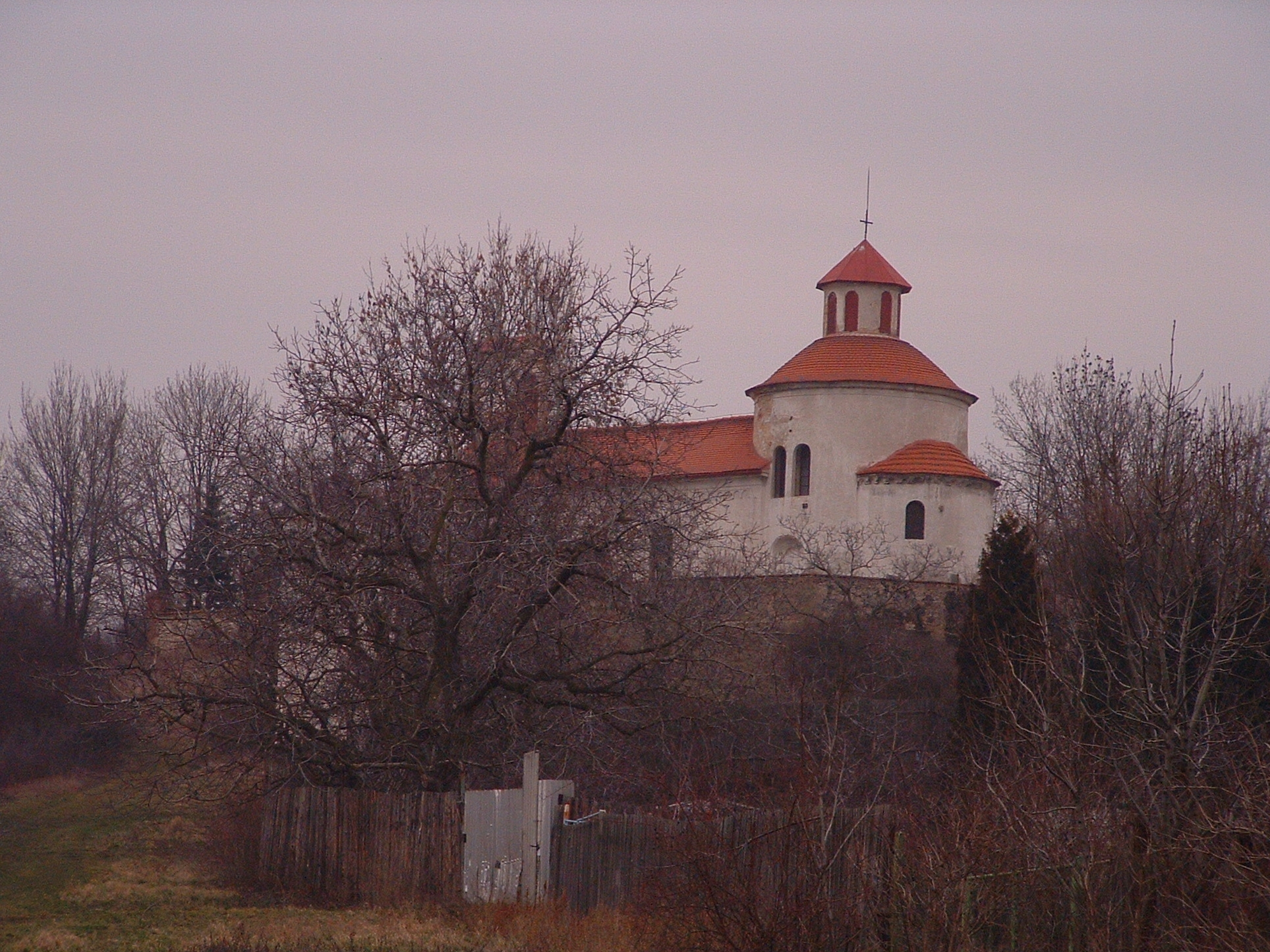
- Church of Saints Peter and Paul

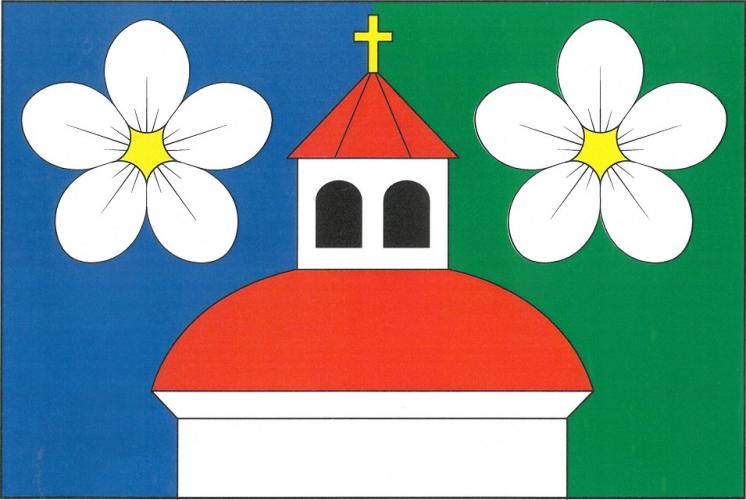
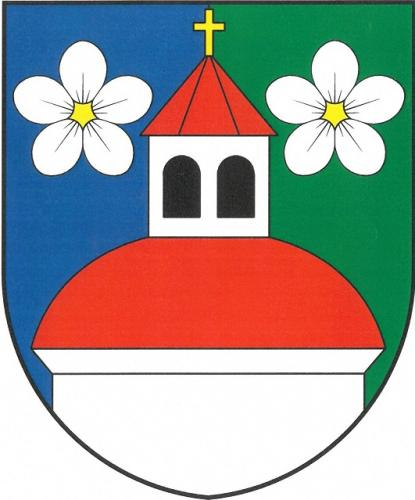
- Flag Coat of arms

- Location in the Czech Republic
- Coordinates: 50°27′51″N 13°52′37″E
- Country: Czech Republic
- Region: Ústí nad Labem
- District: Louny
- First mentioned: 1237

Area
  - Total: 2.28 km^{2} (0.88 sq mi)
- Elevation: 335 m (1,099 ft)

Population (2026-01-01)
  - Total: 100
  - Density: 44/km^{2} (110/sq mi)
- Time zone: UTC+1 (CET)
  - Summer (DST): UTC+2 (CEST)
- Postal code: 440 01
- Website: www.obec-zelkovice.cz

Želkovice (German: Schelkowitz) is a municipality and village in Louny District in the Ústí nad Labem Region of the Czech Republic. It has about 100 inhabitants.

Želkovice lies approximately 13 kilometres (8 mi) north-east of Louny, 25 km (16 mi) south-west of Ústí nad Labem, and 57 km (35 mi) north-west of Prague.

== Demographics ==
Historical population
Year	Pop.	±%
1869	201	—
1880	212	+5.5%
1890	198	−6.6%
1900	175	−11.6%
1910	165	−5.7%
1921	173	+4.8%
1930	172	−0.6%
1950	135	−21.5%
1961	109	−19.3%
1970	124	+13.8%
1980	91	−26.6%
1991	87	−4.4%
2001	81	−6.9%
2011	99	+22.2%
2021	95	−4.0%
Source: Censuses
