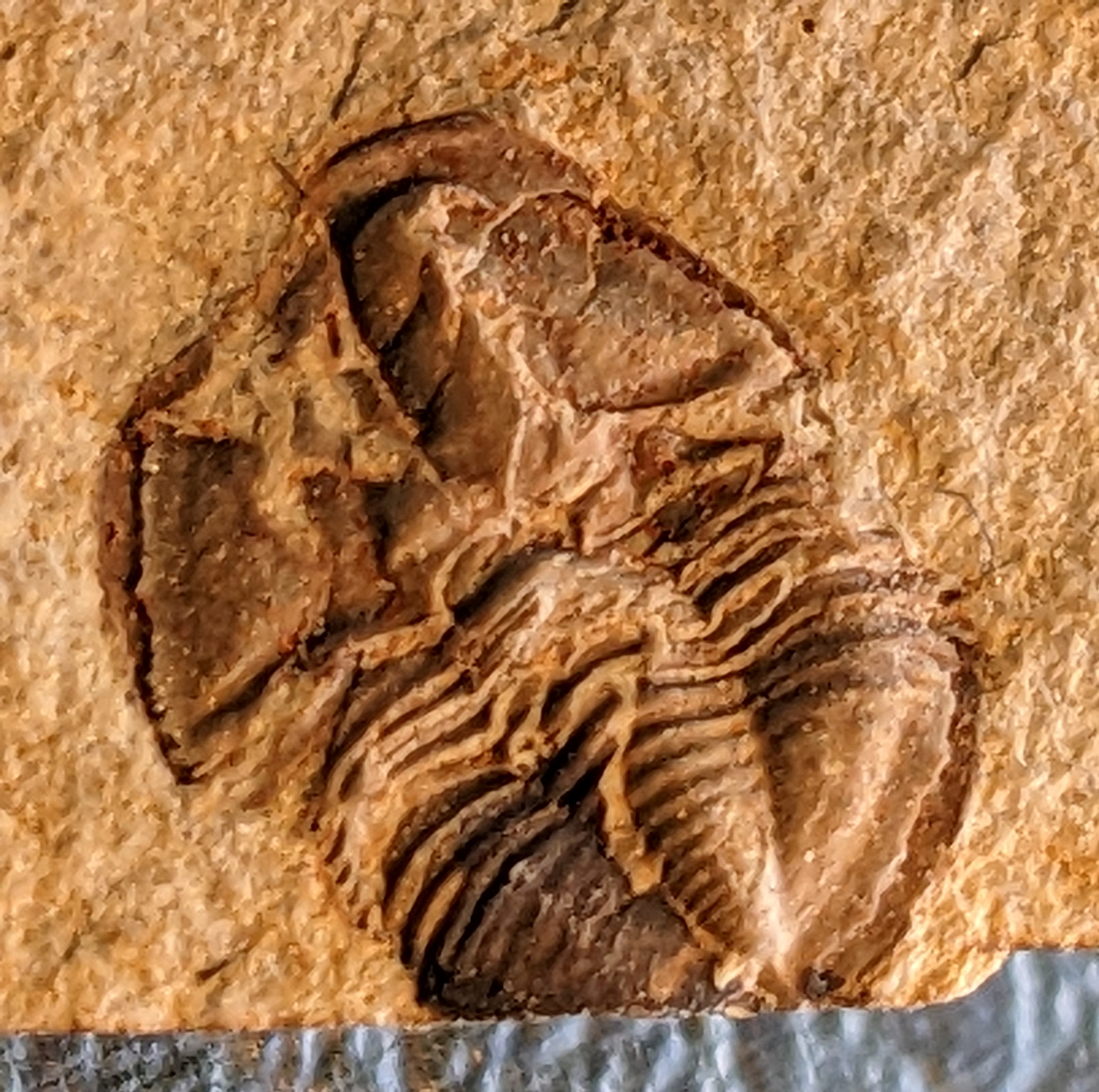
- Wagnerispina coddonensis

Scientific classification
- Kingdom: Animalia
- Phylum: Arthropoda
- Clade: †Artiopoda
- Class: †Trilobita
- Order: †Proetida
- Family: †Proetidae
- Genus: †Wagnerispina; Gandl, 1977

Species
- Wagnerispina coddonensis Owens and Tilsley, 1995

= Wagnerispina =

Wagnerispina Temporal range: Visean Viséan

Extinct genus of trilobites

Wagnerispina is a lower Carboniferous proetid trilobite.

== Etymology ==
Wagnerispina was described from material found in England. The specimen shown is from the same location.

== Distribution ==
Wagnerispina is found across Europe in lower carboniferous deposits and has been collected for example from Viséan deposits of SW England and the Czech republic.

== Taxonomy ==
Identified as proetid trilobite from the lower Visean (Chadian substage) Coddon Hill formation by Woodward 1902.
