= Paretaxalus mucronatus =

Scientific classification
- Kingdom: Animalia
- Phylum: Arthropoda
- Class: Insecta
- Order: Coleoptera
- Suborder: Polyphaga
- Infraorder: Cucujiformia
- Family: Cerambycidae
- Genus: Paretaxalus
- Species: P. mucronatus

Binomial name
- Paretaxalus mucronatus (Schwarzer, 1931)

Synonyms
- Niphona mucronata Schwarzer, 1931

Species of beetle

Paretaxalus mucronatus is a species of beetle in the family Cerambycidae. It was described by Bernhard Schwarzer in 1931. It is known from Borneo.
