= Raymondinidae =

Raymondinidae Temporal range: Middle and Upper Cambrian

Scientific classification
- Kingdom: Animalia
- Phylum: Arthropoda
- Class: Trilobita
- Order: Ptychopariida (?)
- Superfamily: Raymondinacea Clark, 1924
- Family: Raymondinidae Clark, 1924

Subfamilies
- Raymondininae; Cedariniinae; Llanoaspidinae

Raymondinidae are the only family in the trilobite superfamily Raymondinacea, which lived during the Middle and Upper Cambrian.

== Taxonomy ==
The Raymondinidae consists of three subfamilies, but is assumed to be polyphyletic.

- Raymondininae (= Pilgrimiidae)

Raymondina, Amquia, Exigua (= Brassicicephalus), Llanoaspidella, Paracedaria

- Cedariniinae

Cedaria, Cedarina

- Llanoaspidinae

Llanoaspis, Arcuolimbus, Genevievella, Metisaspis
