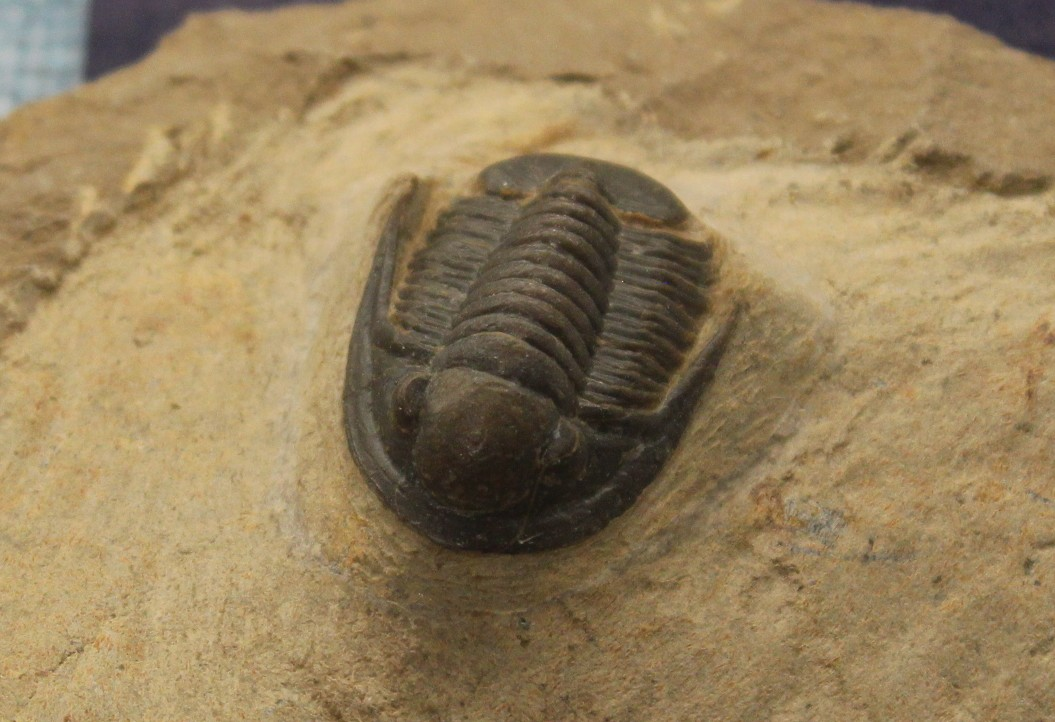
- Fossil specimen, Baoding Natural History Museum

Scientific classification
- Kingdom: Animalia
- Phylum: Arthropoda
- Clade: †Artiopoda
- Class: †Trilobita
- Order: †Proetida
- Family: †Tropidocoryphidae
- Genus: †Diademaproetus; Alberti, 1964

= Diademaproetus =

Diademaproetus Temporal range: Emsian–Eifelian

Extinct genus of trilobites

Diademaproetus is an extinct genus of trilobites in the family Tropidocoryphidae. There are at least four described species in Diademaproetus.

== Species ==
These species belong to the genus Diademaproetus:

- Diademaproetus dianae Viersen, 2015
- Diademaproetus mohamedi Chatterton et al., 2006
- Diademaproetus pertinax Viersen, Taghon & Magrean, 2019
- Diademaproetus rhenanus
- Diademaproetus issoumourensis Molinaro, 2012
- Diademaproetus cf. antatlasius Alberti, 1969
- Diademaproetus praecursor Alberti, 1969
