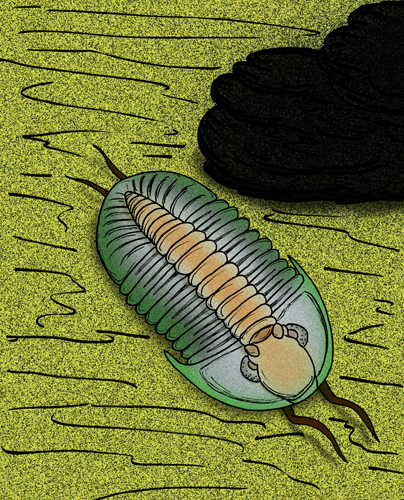
- Artist reconstruction of Persiax praecox

Scientific classification
- Kingdom: Animalia
- Phylum: Arthropoda
- Clade: †Artiopoda
- Class: †Trilobita
- Order: †Proetida
- Family: †Phillipsiidae
- Subfamily: †Cummingellinae
- Genus: †Persiax; Lerosey-Aubril & Deshmukh, 2022
- Species: †P. praecox

Binomial name
- †Persiax praecox (Lerosey-Aubril, 2012)

= Persiax =

Persiax Temporal range: Tournaisian

Genus of trilobites

Persiax praecox is a species of phillipsiid proetid trilobite from Tournaisian-aged marine strata in what is now Eastern Iran.

== Etymology ==
The original generic name refers to "Persia," the old name of Iran, the country where the type specimen was found. The specific name refers to how it is the earliest known and most primitive phillipsiid of the subfamily Cummingellinae, i.e., that it is the progenitor of Cummingellinae. Because "Persia" as a taxonomic name is preoccupied by a bivalve mollusk, Persia monstrosa Repin 1996, from Early Triassic-aged marine strata of the Salt and Surghar Ranges in Pakistan, P. praecox was renamed as Persiax praecox.
