= Hedstroemia (trilobite) =

Scientific classification
- Domain: Eukaryota
- Kingdom: Animalia
- Phylum: Arthropoda
- Class: †Trilobita
- Order: †Proetida
- Family: †Proetidae
- Genus: †Hedstroemia; Pribyl and Vanek, 1978

Type species
- Proetus delicatus Hedström, 1923

Synonyms
- Milesdavis Lieberman, 1994 Pachyproetus Lutke, 1990

Extinct genus of trilobites

Hedstroemia is a genus of trilobites in the order Proetida known from the Silurian period of Europe, Asia, and North America.

== Taxonomic history ==
The genus Hedstroemia was named in 1978. The type species designated was Hedstroemia delicatus, which had originally been described as Proetus delicatus in 1923. In 1990 the subgenus Pachyproetus was proposed to accommodate a single species, P. pachydermata. In 1994, the genus Milesdavis was proposed based on incomplete fossils consisting of the pygidium (rear segment) of three individuals. The genus was named after musician Miles Davis, and the type species, Milesdavis eldredgei, was named in honor of the paleontologist Niles Eldredge. In 1997, Milesdavis and the subgenus Pachyproetus were recognized as junior synonyms of Hedstroemia, by paleontologist Jonathan Adrain, who regarded the type species of both as ingroup Hedstroemia.

== Species ==
Several species of Hedstroemia are recognized, and other species are questionably assigned to the genus. Species names with the authority in parentheses were originally described as a different genus.

- H. delicata (Hedström, 1923)
- H. eldredgei (Lieberman, 1994)
- H. kulchini Ludvigsen & Tripp, 1990
- H. pachydermata (Barret, 1878)
- H. planedorsata (Schmidt, 1894)
- H. sourdoughi Ludvigsen & Tripp, 1990
- H. sugiharensis (Kobayashi & Hamada, 1974)
- H. weedoni Adrain, 1997

Questionable species

- ?H. channahonensis (Weller, 1907)
- ?H. zlichoviana (Pribyl, 1966)
