= Gitarra =

Gitarra Temporal range: late Tournaisian - Late Westphalian

Scientific classification
- Domain: Eukaryota
- Kingdom: Animalia
- Phylum: Arthropoda
- Class: †Trilobita
- Order: †Proetida
- Family: †Proetidae
- Genus: †Gitarra; Gandl, 1968

Species
- G. leonensis Romano, 1971; G. pupuloides (Leyh, 1897)

Extinct genus of trilobites

Gitarra is a genus of trilobite in the family Proetidae that lived between the late Tournaisian and Late Westphalian of the Carboniferous period.

== History and classification ==
The genus was described by Josef Gandl in 1968, who assigned it to the family Phillipsiidae. This placement was challenged by Halszka Osmólska in 1970, who noted the similarity of Gitarra to the, then Proetidae, genera Griffithidella and Weania.

== Distribution ==
Gitarra has been found in the Carboniferous of Germany, and Spain.
