= Helokybe =

Scientific classification
- Domain: Eukaryota
- Kingdom: Animalia
- Phylum: Arthropoda
- Class: †Trilobita
- Order: †Proetida
- Family: †Proetidae
- Genus: †Helokybe; Thomas & Narbonne, 1979

Species
- Helokybe spio

Extinct genus of trilobites

Helokybe is a genus of trilobite in the family Proetidae that is known from Silurian age sediments of Nunavut Canada and the Holy Cross Mountains in Poland.
