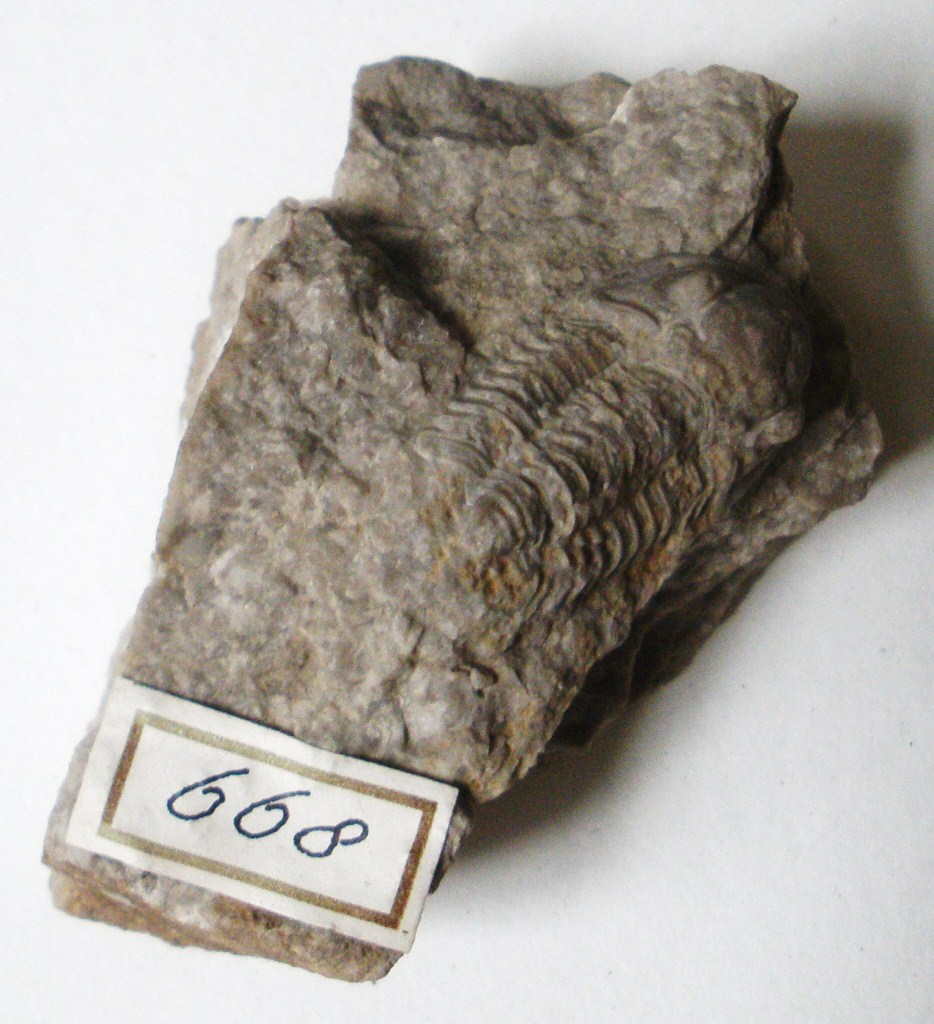
- Fossil of P. concinnus

Scientific classification
- Kingdom: Animalia
- Phylum: Arthropoda
- Clade: †Artiopoda
- Class: †Trilobita
- Order: †Proetida
- Family: †Proetidae
- Genus: †Proetus; Steininger, 1831

Type species
- Calymene concinna Dalman, 1827

Species
- See text

= Proetus (trilobite) =

Proetus Temporal range: Silurian–Devonian

Genus of trilobites

Proetus is a genus of proetid trilobite found in Silurian-aged marine strata of Europe and Devonian-aged strata of Gondwana.

== Etymology ==
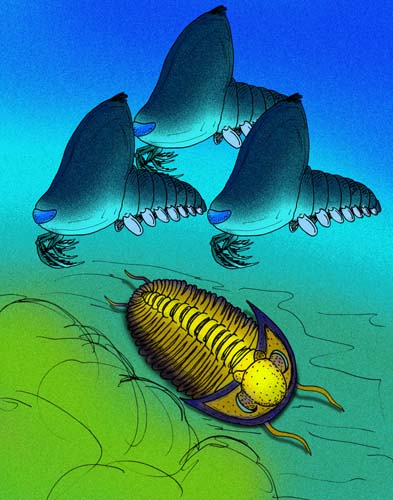
Comparison of P. concinnus and Ainiktozoon

The generic name commemorates Proetus (Ancient Greek: Προῖτος), a mythical king of Argos and Tiryns, son of King Abas of Argo.

== Taxonomy ==
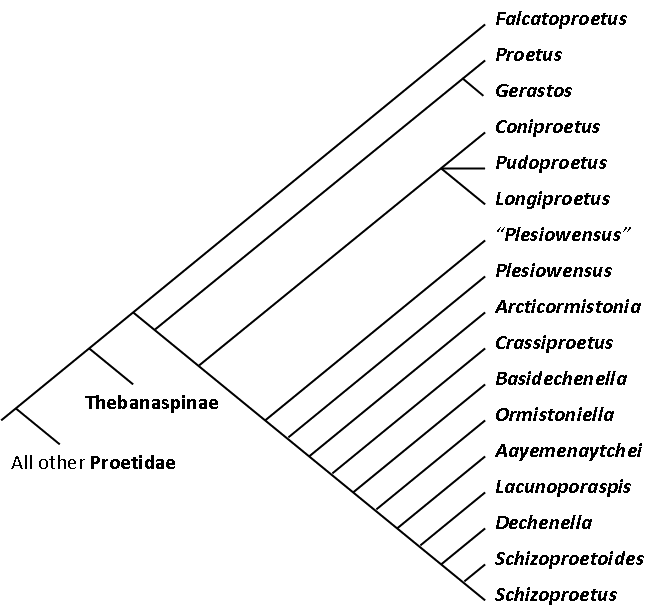
Cladogram of the genera of the subfamily Proetinae, according to Lieberman, 1994, figures 5 and 6

Proetus is the type genus of the order Proetida, and of the family Proetidae. The genus became a wastebasket taxon that held numerous species of similar looking trilobites from the Ordovician to Carboniferous periods. Most of these species have been split off into other genera at various times.

=== Species ===
The following list is incomplete:

- The type species Proetus concinnus is found in Wenlock-aged marine strata of Sweden, Great Britain, Estonia, and Germany
- Proetus latifrons is found in Llandovery-aged marine strata of Ireland and Great Britain.
- Proetus latimargo is found in Australian Devonian strata.
- Proetus sparsinodosus is found in Australian Devonian strata.
- Proetus talenti is found in Australian Devonian strata.
