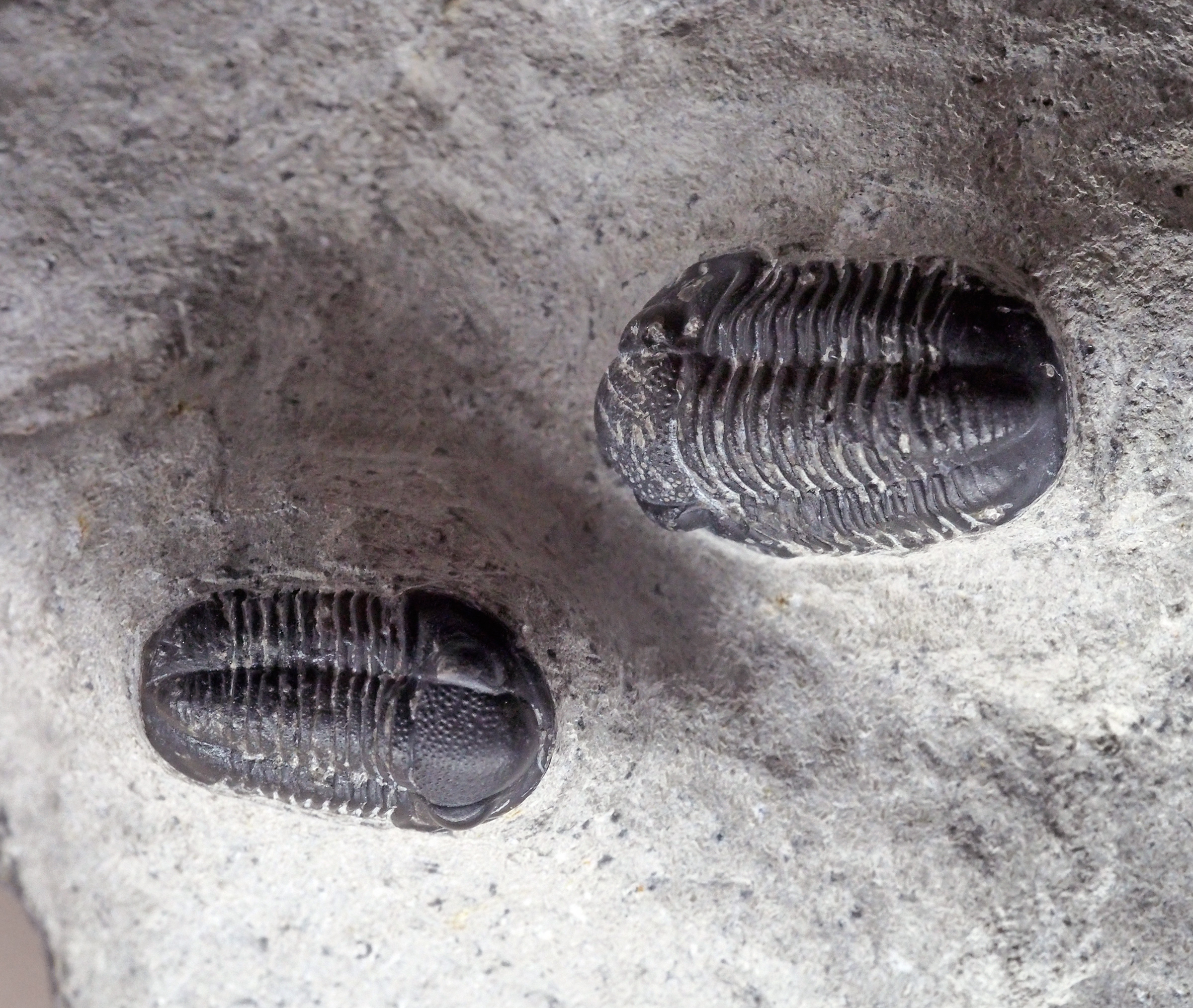
- Gerastos tuberculatus from Morocco
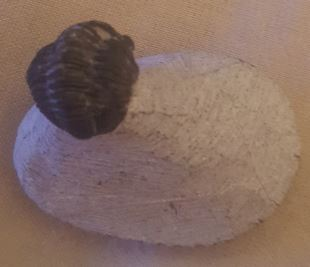
- Gerastos sp. from Morocco

Scientific classification
- Kingdom: Animalia
- Phylum: Arthropoda
- Clade: †Artiopoda
- Class: †Trilobita
- Order: †Proetida
- Family: †Proetidae
- Genus: †Gerastos; Goldfuss, 1843

Species
- G. cornix Van Viersen, 2021; G. granulosus Goldfuss, 1843; G. kesselaeri Van Viersen, Taghon & Magrean, 2019; G. silvicultrix Van Viersen, Taghon & Magrean, 2019; G. tuberculatus marocensis Chatterton et al., 2006

= Gerastos =

Gerastos Temporal range: Early-Middle Devonian

Extinct genus of trilobites

Gerastos is a genus of proetid trilobite in the family Proetidae that lived between the Pragian and Eifelian of the Lower-Middle Devonian, spanning approximately 21 million years.

It was described by Goldfuss in 1843.

== Distribution ==
Gerastos has been found in the Devonian of Belgium, Germany, the Czech Republic and Morocco.

== Description ==
Gerastos has holochroal eyes situated to the side of its enlarged glabella region of the cephalon. The surface of the cephalon can be smooth or covered with pustules.

Length rarely exceeds 3 cm.
