= Cyamella (trilobite) =

Cyamella Temporal range: Ordovician

Scientific classification
- Kingdom: Animalia
- Phylum: Arthropoda
- Clade: †Artiopoda
- Class: †Trilobita
- Order: †Proetida
- Family: †Rorringtoniidae
- Genus: †Cyamella; Owens in Owens & Hammann, 1990

Synonyms
- "Cyamops" Owens, 1978

Genus of trilobites

Cyamella is a genus of proetid trilobites. It was originally described by Robert M. Owens in 1978, as "Cyamops", a junior homonym of the fly genus Cyamops, but was renamed in 1990.
