= Paraphillipsia =

Paraphillipsia Temporal range: Permian

Scientific classification
- Kingdom: Animalia
- Phylum: Arthropoda
- Clade: †Artiopoda
- Class: †Trilobita
- Order: †Proetida
- Family: †Phillipsiidae
- Subfamily: †Cummingellinae
- Genus: †Paraphillipsia; Toumansky, 1935

Genus of trilobites

Paraphillipsia is a genus of proetid trilobites in the family Phillipsiidae. It is notable for being one of the last trilobites to go extinct during the Permian–Triassic extinction event.

== Species ==
- Paraphillipsia aglypta
- Paraphillipsia inflata
- Paraphillipsia karpinskyi
- Paraphillipsia levigata
- Paraphillipsia midlemissi
- Paraphillipsia pahara
- Paraphillipsia taurica (synonymous with P. kussicum, P. anfensis, and P. netschaewi)
- Paraphillipsia vnweberi
