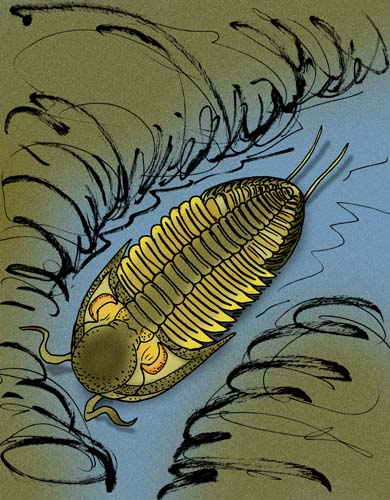
- Artist's reconstruction of Paladin morrowensis.

Scientific classification
- Kingdom: Animalia
- Phylum: Arthropoda
- Clade: †Artiopoda
- Class: †Trilobita
- Order: †Proetida
- Family: †Proetidae
- Genus: †Paladin; Weller, 1936

= Paladin (trilobite) =

Paladin Temporal range: Carboniferous – Permian, 353.8–259.0 Ma

Extinct genus of trilobites

Paladin is a genus of trilobite which lived 354–259 Ma, during the Late Paleozoic era; more specifically, during the Carboniferous and Permian periods. It was widespread: fossils have been discovered in what are now East Asia, Europe and North America.

The genus was erected in 1936 by J. M. Weller. The name derives from the paladins, the semi-legendary twelve foremost knights of Emperor Charlemagne (748–814).

Paladin was a fast-moving low-level epifaunal deposit feeder; that is, it scavenged at the bottom of shallow marine or brackish waters.

== Species ==
Approximately fifty species have been assigned to the genus; the following are accepted:

- P. eichwaldi shunnerensis (King, 1914). 326.4–318.1 Ma, Great Shunner Fell, England. Synonyms Griffithides shunnerensis, P. shunnerensis, Weberides shunnerensis.
- P. helmsensis (Whittington, 1954). 339.4–318.1 Ma, Texas.
- P. iwaizakiensis (Kobayashi and Hamada, 1984). 265.0–259.0 Ma, Japan.
- P. morrowensis (Mather, 1915). 318.1–314.6 Ma, Oklahoma. Synonym Griffithides morrowensis.
- P. mucronatus (Girty, 1910). 339.4–336.0 Ma, Arkansas and Oklahoma. Synonym Griffithides mucronatus.
- P. opisthops (Kobayashi and Hamada, 1979). 314.6-306.95 Ma, Thailand.
- P. veeravurusi (Kobayashi and Hamada, 1979). 314.6-306.95 Ma, Thailand.
