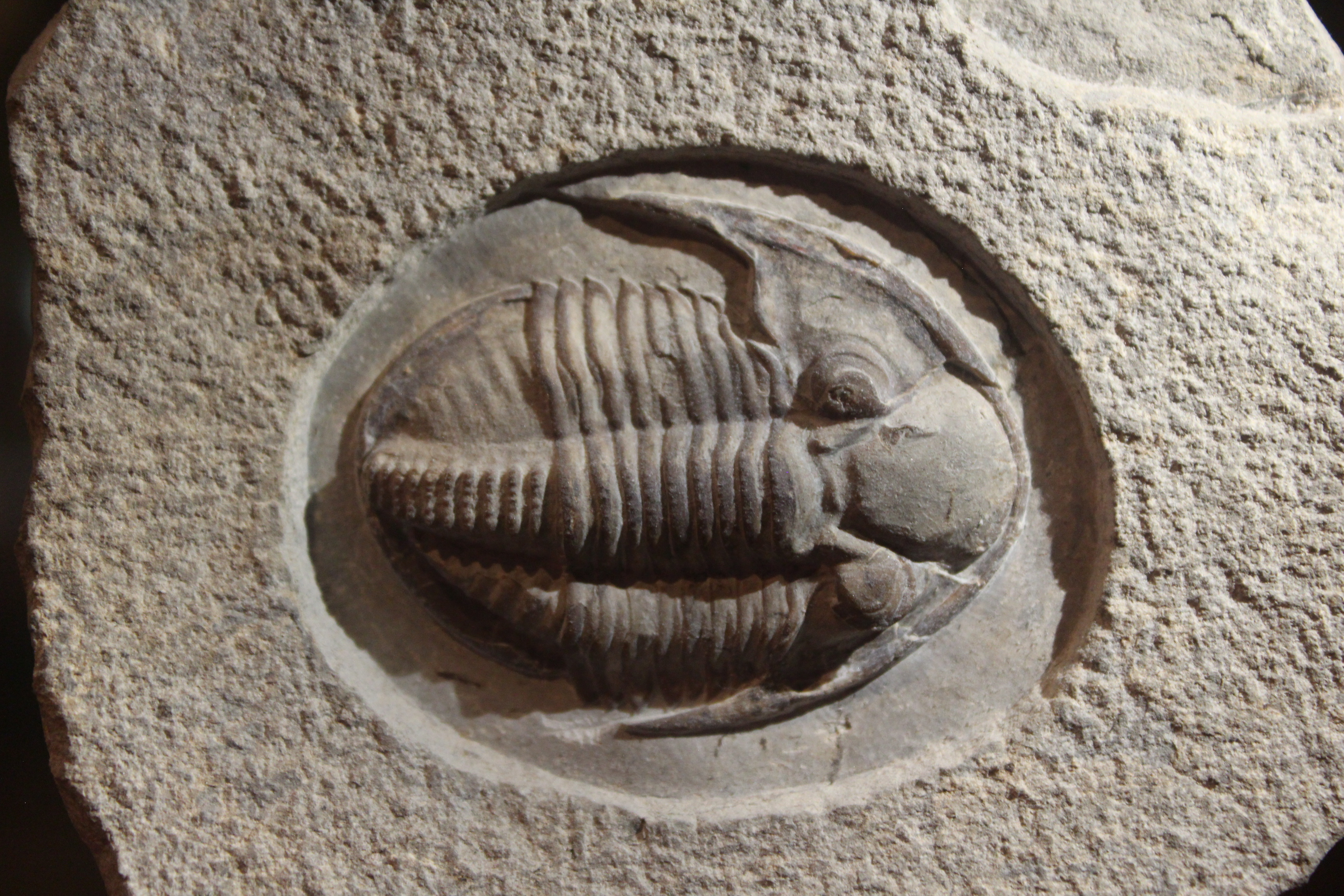
- Pseudophillipsia artiensis, National Museum of Natural History

Scientific classification
- Kingdom: Animalia
- Phylum: Arthropoda
- Clade: †Artiopoda
- Class: †Trilobita
- Order: †Proetida
- Family: †Phillipsiidae
- Subfamily: †Ditomopyginae
- Genus: †Pseudophillipsia; Gemmellaro, 1890

Synonyms
- Carniphillipsia

= Pseudophillipsia =

Pseudophillipsia Temporal range: Gzhelian to Changhsingian, 303.7–251.9 Ma

Extinct genus of trilobites

Pseudophillipsia is a genus of trilobites, notable for being one of the last members of the group before the extinction at the end of the Permian. It first appeared during the Pennsylvanian or Late Carboniferous. There are several species and this genus has a range spanning Eurasia.
