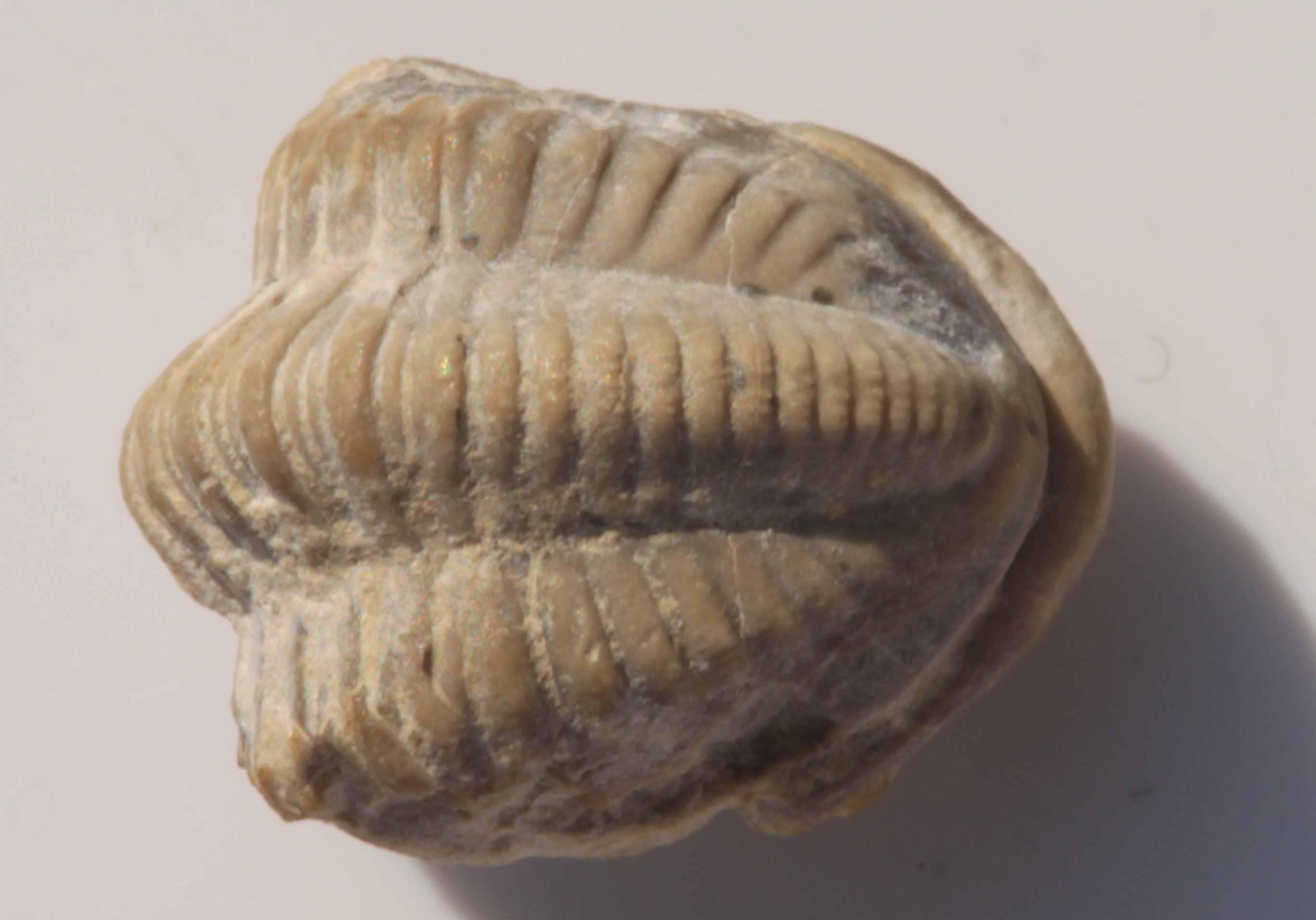
- Ditomopyge decurtata fossil

Scientific classification
- Kingdom: Animalia
- Phylum: Arthropoda
- Clade: †Artiopoda
- Class: †Trilobita
- Order: †Proetida
- Family: †Phillipsiidae
- Subfamily: †Ditomopyginae
- Genus: †Ditomopyge; Newell, 1931

Species
- See text

= Ditomopyge =

Ditomopyge Temporal range: Carboniferous-Permian ~345–252 Ma

Extinct genus of trilobite

Ditomopyge is an extinct genus of trilobite belonging to the family Proetidae. It was extant during the Carboniferous and Permian and is widely distributed, with fossils found in Europe, southwest Asia, southeast Asia, Australia, North America, and South America.

== Species ==
- Ditomopyge amorni Kobayashi and Hamada, 1979
- Ditomopyge bjornensis Ormiston, 1973
- Ditomopyge decurtata Gheyselinck, 1937
- Ditomopyge dereimsi Arellano, 1983
- Ditomopyge fatmii Grant, 1966
- Ditomopyge granulata Weber, 1933
- Ditomopyge kumpani Weber, 1933
- Ditomopyge meridionalis Teichert, 1944
- Ditomopyge ovalis Gauri, 1965
- Ditomopyge scitula Meek and Worthen, 1865
- Ditomopyge whitei Pabian and Faberstrom, 1972
- Ditomopyge yampupatensis Arellano, 1983
