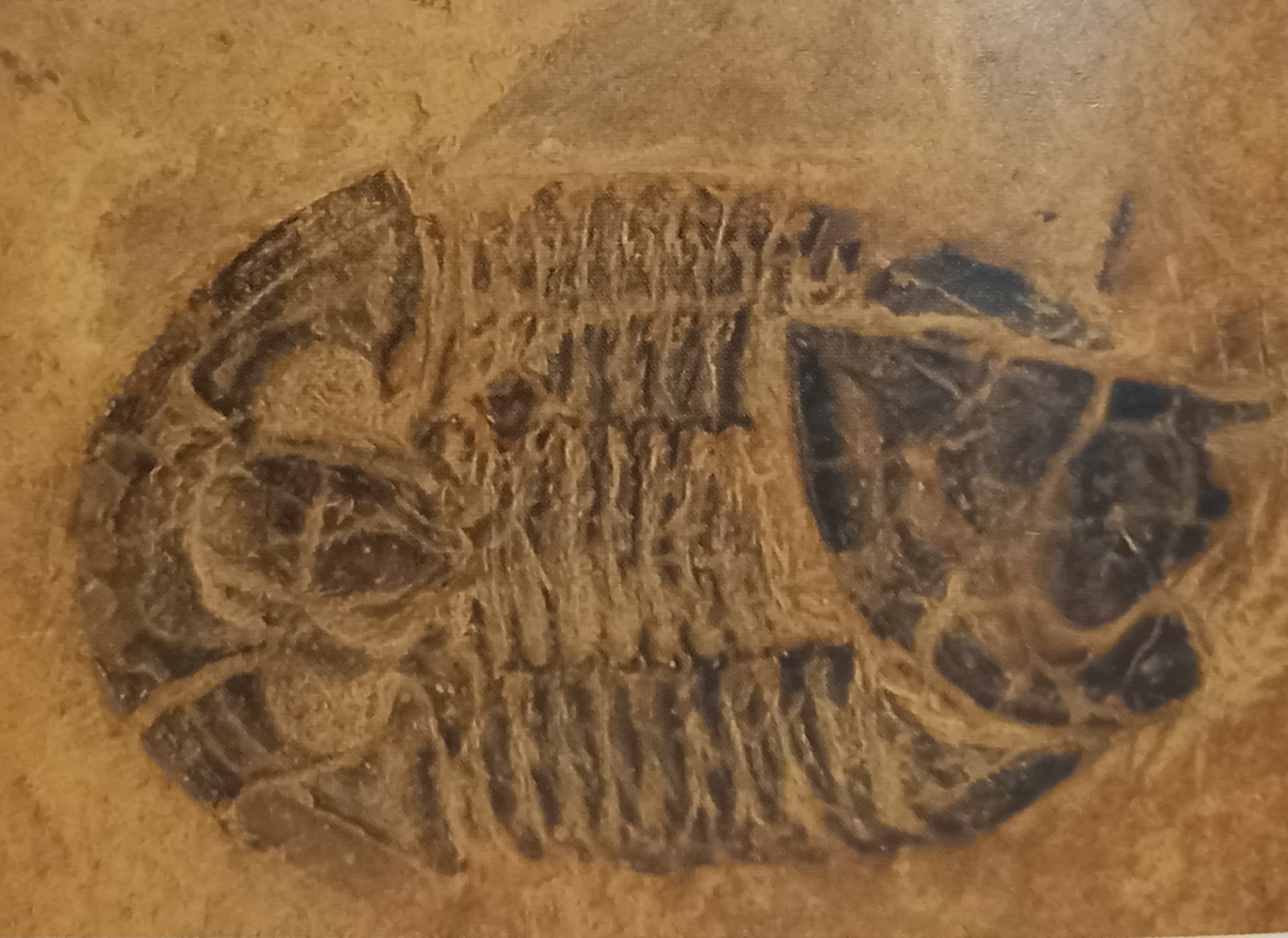
- Dechenella from the Devonian period, Iran

Scientific classification
- Domain: Eukaryota
- Kingdom: Animalia
- Phylum: Arthropoda
- Class: †Trilobita
- Order: †Proetida
- Family: †Proetidae
- Genus: †Dechenella; Kayser, 1880

= Dechenella =

Dechenella Temporal range: 411–383 Ma

Extinct genus of trilobites

Dechenella is an extinct genus of trilobites from the Devonian. It has been reported from America, Canada, Alaska, Germany, Italy, Czech Republic, Iran and Japan.
