= List of the Paleozoic life of Arizona =

This list of the Paleozoic life of Arizona contains the various prehistoric life-forms whose fossilized remains have been reported from within the US state of Arizona and are between 538.8 and 252.17 million years of age.

== A ==
- †Acandylacanthus
- †Acanthopecten
  - †Acanthopecten coloradoensis
- †Achistrum
  - †Achistrum frizzelli
- †Aclisina – tentative report
  - †Aclisina bisulcata – type locality for species
- †Acrocephalops
- †Adetognathus
  - †Adetognathus gigantus
  - †Adetognathus lautus
- †Aglaocrinus
  - †Aglaocrinus konecnyorum – type locality for species
  - †Aglaocrinus nacoensis – type locality for species
- †Aglaoglypta
  - †Aglaoglypta maera
- †Alisporites
- †Alloiopteris
  - †Alloiopteris sternbergii
- †Alloipteris
  - †Alloipteris sternbergii
- †Allorisma – tentative report
  - †Allorisma juveniles – informal
- †Alokistocare
- †Altudoceras
  - †Altudoceras mckeei – type locality for species
- †Alula
  - †Alula gilberti
- †Ambocoelia
- †Amelacanthus
- †Ameura
- †Amphipora
- †Amphiscapha
  - †Amphiscapha proxima
  - †Amphiscapha subrugosa
- †Amplexizaphrentis
- †Anisopyge
  - †Anisopyge inornata
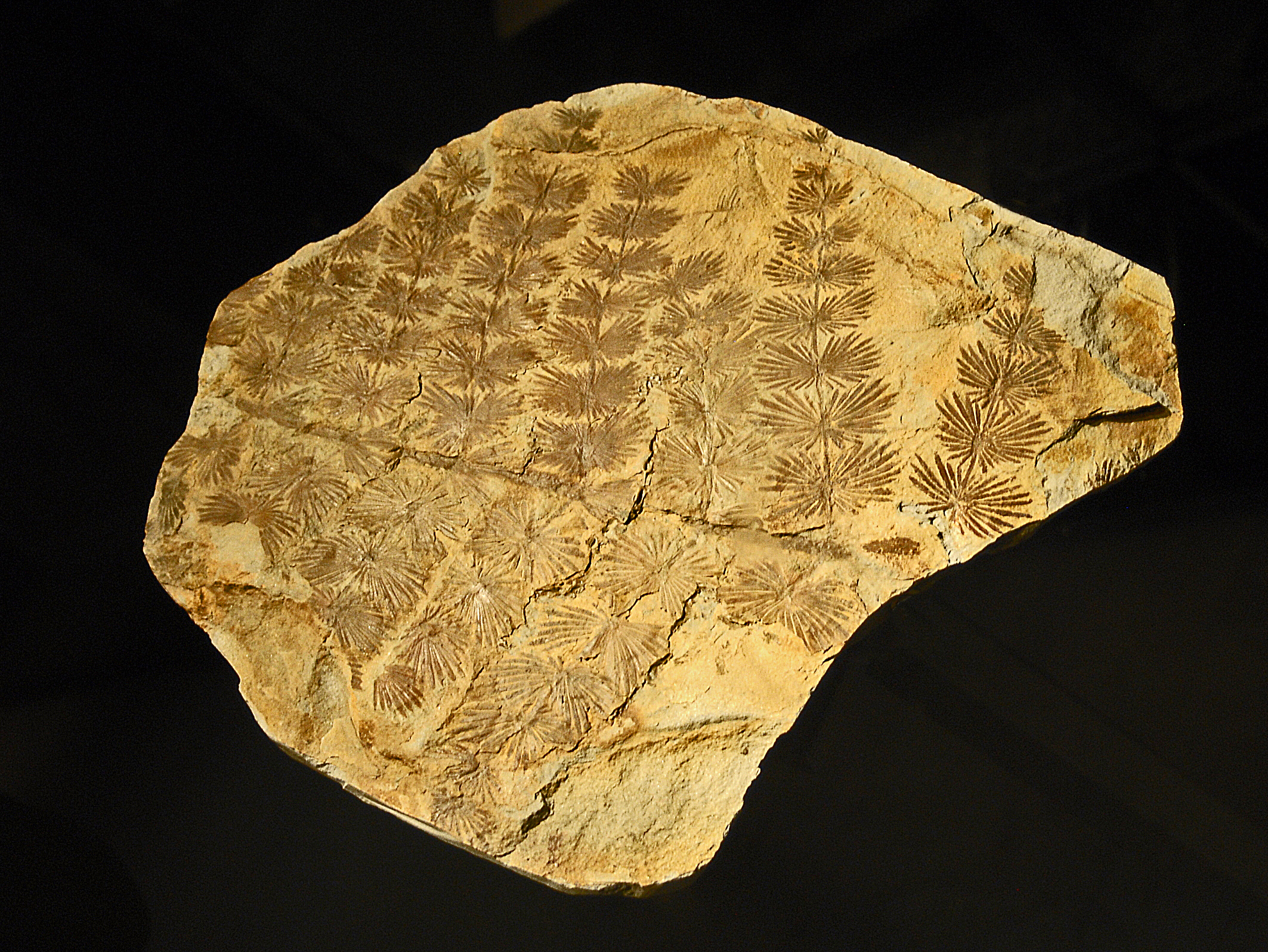
- Fossil of the Carboniferous horsetail relative Annularia
  †Annularia
  - †Annularia asteris
  - †Annularia mucronata
  - †Annularia stellata
- †Anomphalus
- †Anoria
- †Antagmus
- †Anthracospirifer
  - †Anthracospirifer leidyi
  - †Anthracospirifer newberryi
  - †Anthracospirifer occiduus
  - †Anthracospirifer opimus – or unidentified comparable form
  - †Anthracospirifer tanoensis
- †Antiquatonia
  - †Antiquatonia portlockianus
- †Apachella – type locality for genus
  - †Apachella arizonensis – type locality for species
  - †Apachella franciscana – type locality for species
  - †Apachella mulensis
  - †Apachella prodontia
  - †Apachella translirata
  - †Apachella turbiniformis – type locality for species
- †Aphyllopteris
- †Arasta
  - †Arasta torquata
- †Arastra – type locality for genus
  - †Arastra torquata – type locality for species
- †Archaeocidaris
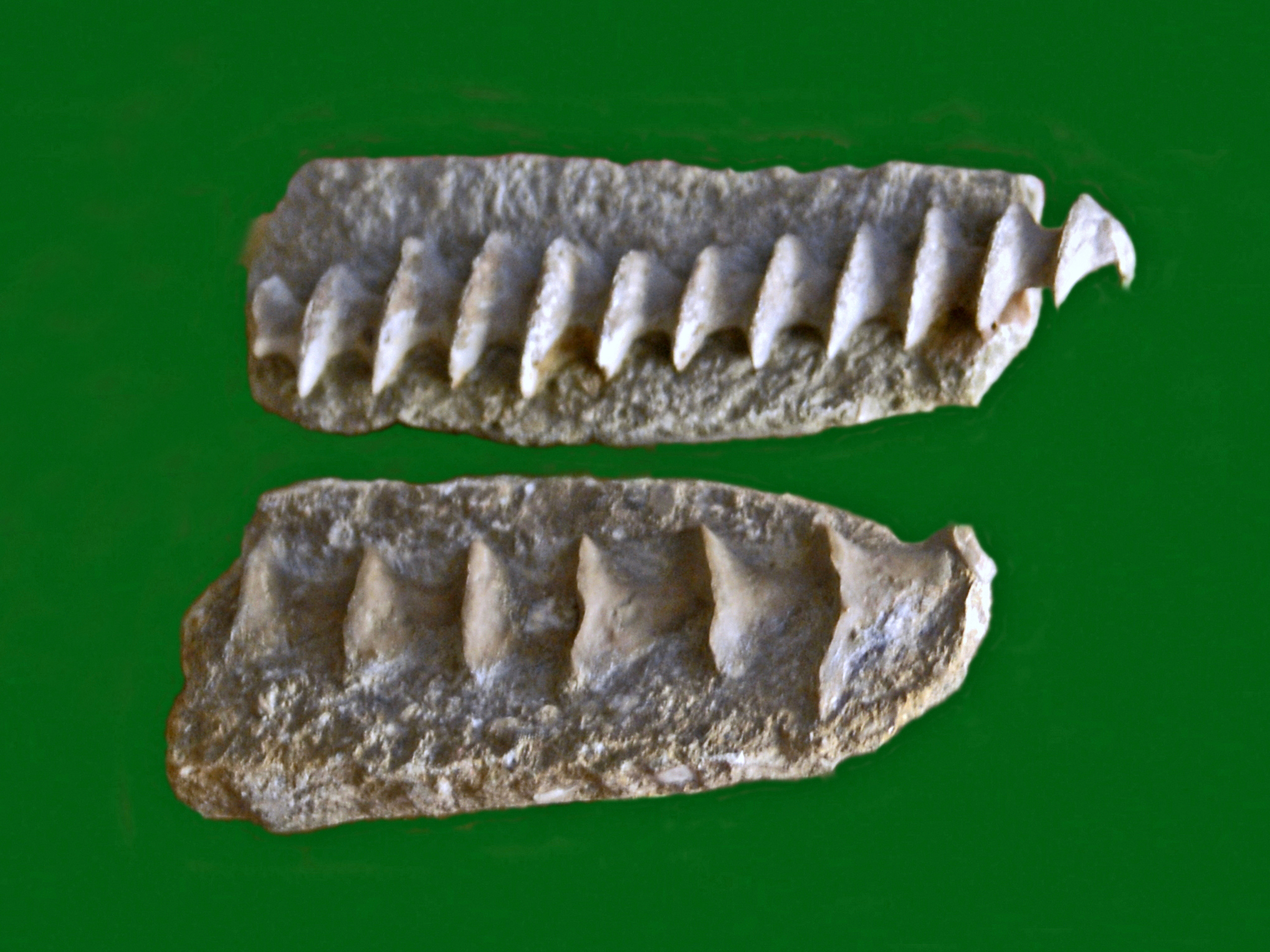
- Fossils of the Carboniferous-Permian bryozoan Archimedes
  †Archimedes
  - †Archimedes confertus
  - †Archimedes intermedius
  - †Archimedes invaginatus
  - †Archimedes lativolvis
  - †Archimedes proutanus
  - †Archimedes terebriformis
- †Arcochiton
  - †Arcochiton richardsoni
- †Arizonella – type locality for genus
  - †Arizonella allecta – type locality for species
- †Arizonerpeton – type locality for genus
  - †Arizonerpeton wellsi – type locality for species
- †Astartella
  - †Astartella subquadrata
- †Asterophyllites
  - †Asterophyllites equisetiformis
  - †Asterophyllites grandis
- †Athyris
- †Atribonium
  - †Atribonium arizonensis
- †Aulametacoceras – type locality for genus
  - †Aulametacoceras mckeei – type locality for species
- †Aulopora
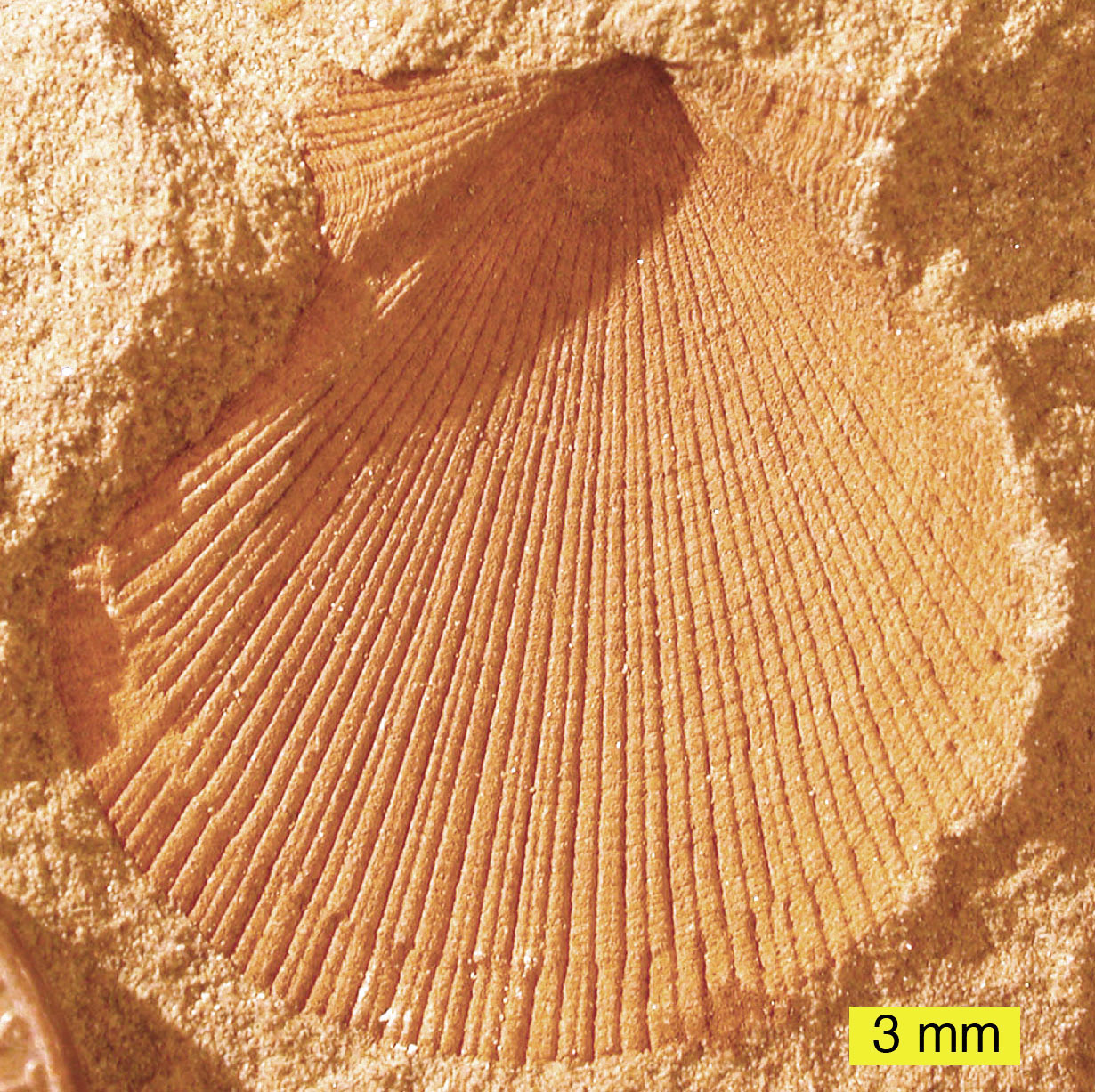
- Mold fossil of a shell of the Early Devonian-Late Triassic bivalve Aviculopecten
  †Aviculopecten
  - †Aviculopecten bellatulus – type locality for species
  - †Aviculopecten girtyi – or unidentified comparable form
  - †Aviculopecten gravidus
  - †Aviculopecten kaibabensis – type locality for species
- †Aviculopinna
  - †Aviculopinna peracuta – tentative report

== B ==
- †Bakevellia
  - †Bakevellia prora – type locality for species
  - †Bakevellia sulcata
- †Batostomella
  - †Batostomella nitidula
  - †Batostomella spinulosa
- †Batostromella
- †Baxtonia
  - †Baxtonia arizonensis
- †Baylea
  - †Baylea coheni – type locality for species
- †Bellaclathrus – type locality for genus
  - †Bellaclathrus spinosus – type locality for species
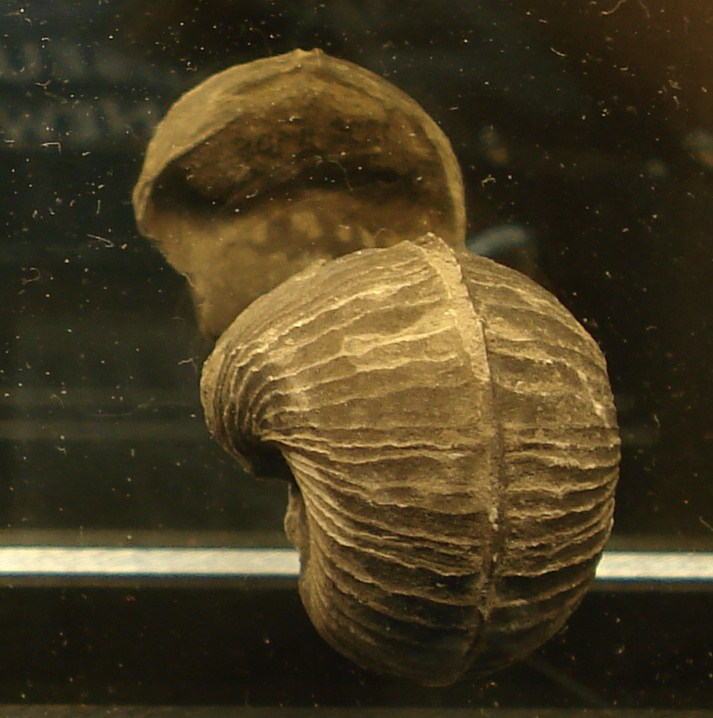
- Fossilized shell of the Silurian-Early Triassic mollusc Bellerophon
  †Bellerophon
  - †Bellerophon deflectus – type locality for species
  - †Bellerophon huecoensis
  - †Bellerophon parvicristus
  - †Bellerophon sublaevis
- †Biarmeaspira
  - †Biarmeaspira multilineata
- †Bicorbis – type locality for genus
  - †Bicorbis arizonica – type locality for species
- †Bolaspis
  - †Bolaspis aemula
- †Brachyphyllum
  - †Brachyphyllum arizonicum – type locality for species
  - †Brachyphyllum arizonieum – type locality for species
  - †Brachyphyllum tenue – type locality for species
- †Brachythyris
  - †Brachythyris chesterensis
  - †Brachythyris peculiaris
- †Bradyospira – type locality for genus
  - †Bradyospira johnsensis – type locality for species
- †Bransonella
  - †Bransonella lingulata – tentative report
  - †Bransonella nebraskensis – tentative report
  - †Bransonella tribula – type locality for species
- †Brongniartites – tentative report
  - †Brongniartites aliena – type locality for species
  - †Brongniartites yakiensis – type locality for species
- †Bucanopsis
- †Buxtonia
  - †Buxtonia arizonensis
  - †Buxtonia arkansansus
  - †Buxtonia arkansanus

== C ==
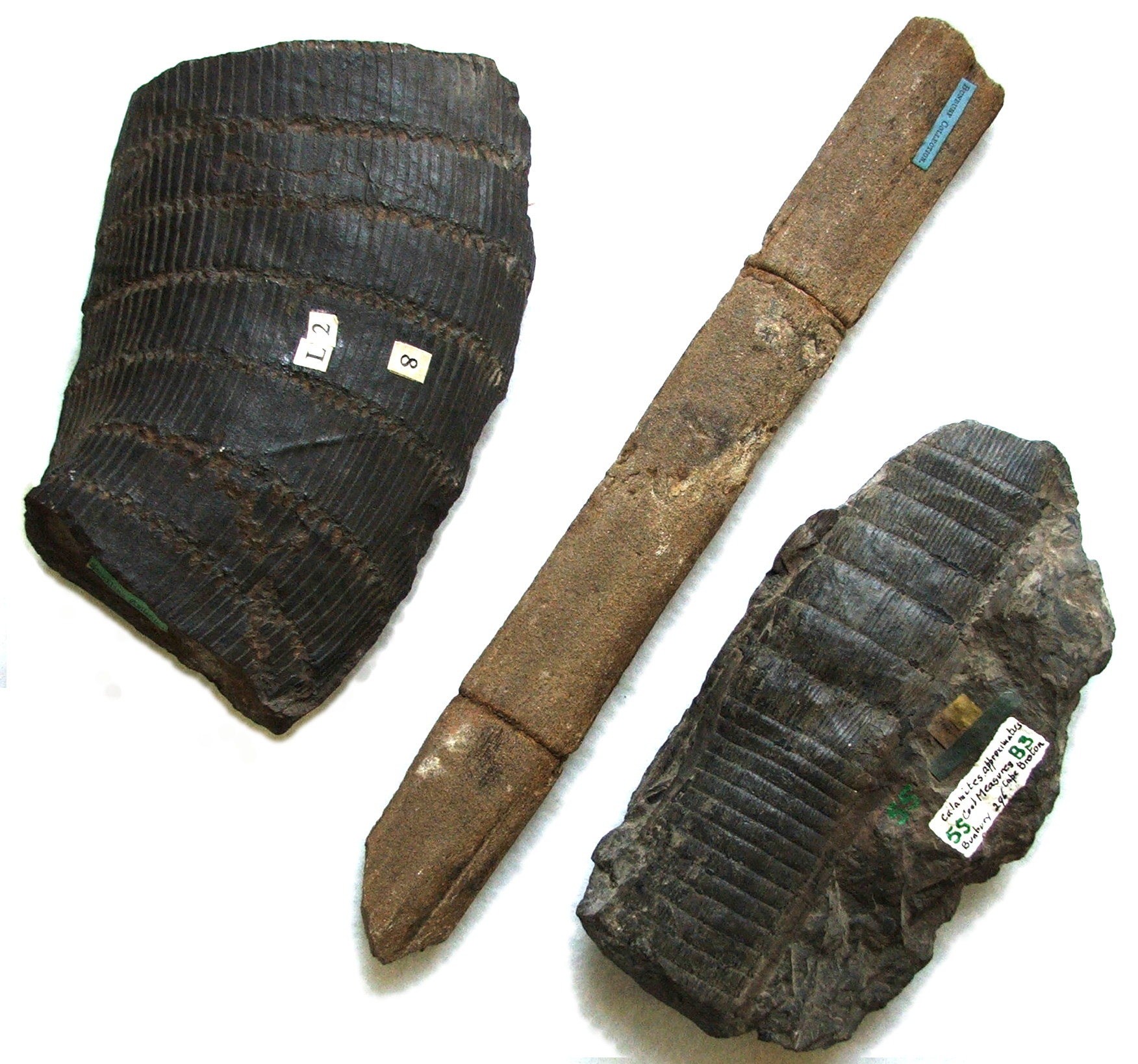
- Fossilized stems from the Carboniferous-Permian horsetail relative Calamites
  †Calamites
  - †Calamites cisti
  - †Calamites cistiiformis
- †Callipteris
  - †Callipteris arizonae – type locality for species
  - †Callipteris C. flabellifera – or unidentified comparable form
  - †Callipteris conferta
  - †Callipteris flabellifera
  - †Callipteris raymondi
- †Camarotechia
  - †Camarotechia metallica
- †Camarotoechia
  - †Camarotoechia metallica
  - †Camarotoechia mutata
  - †Camarotoechia purduei
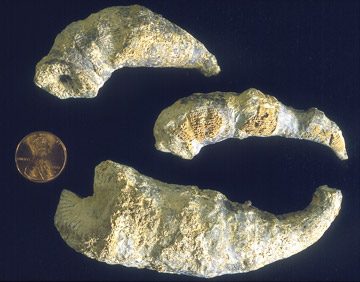
- Fossils of the Devonian-Permian horn coral Caninia
  †Caninia – tentative report
  - †Caninia arcuata
- †Carpolithus
- †Chilotrypa – tentative report
- †Chonetes
  - †Chonetes okahomensis
  - †Chonetes oklahomensis
- †Cibecuia – type locality for genus
  - †Cibecuia cedarensis – type locality for species
- †Clavaspidella
  - †Clavaspidella kanabensis
- †Cleiothyridina
  - †Cleiothyridina orbicularis
- †Cliothyridina
  - †Cliothyridina sublamellosa
- †Cloithyridina
  - †Cloithyridina hirsuta
- †Complexisporites
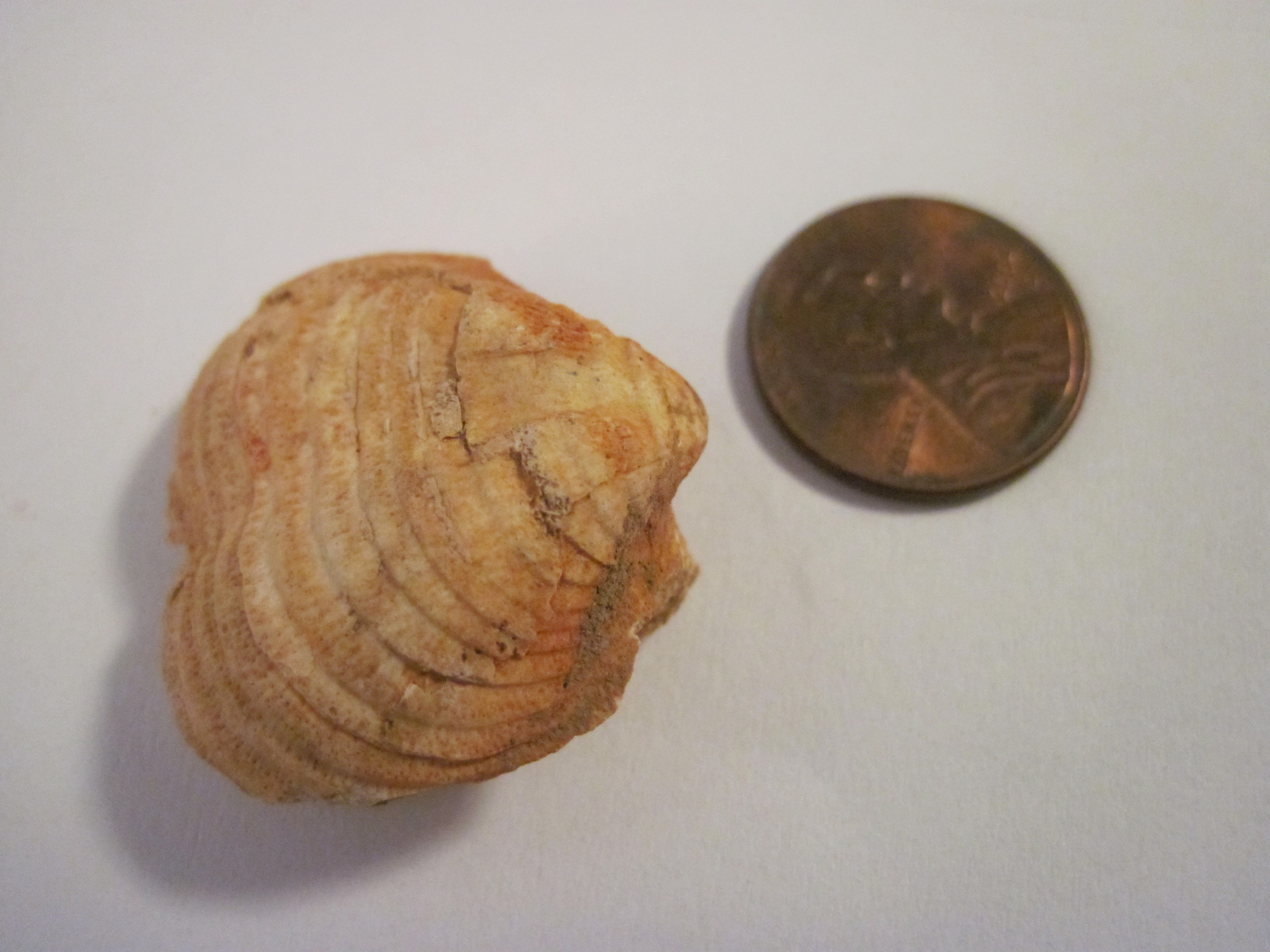
- Fossilized shell of the Late Devonian-Permian brachiopod Composita
  †Composita
  - †Composita deltoides
  - †Composita gibbosa
  - †Composita humilis
  - †Composita laevis
  - †Composita lewisensis
  - †Composita mexicana
  - †Composita ovata
  - †Composita ozarkana
  - †Composita subtilia
  - †Composita subtilita
  - †Composita trinuclea
- †Conetes
  - †Conetes oklahomensis
- †Congeriomorpha – type locality for genus
  - †Congeriomorpha andrusovi – type locality for species
- †Conularia
  - †Conularia kaibabensis – type locality for species
- †Converrucosisporites
- †Convolutispora
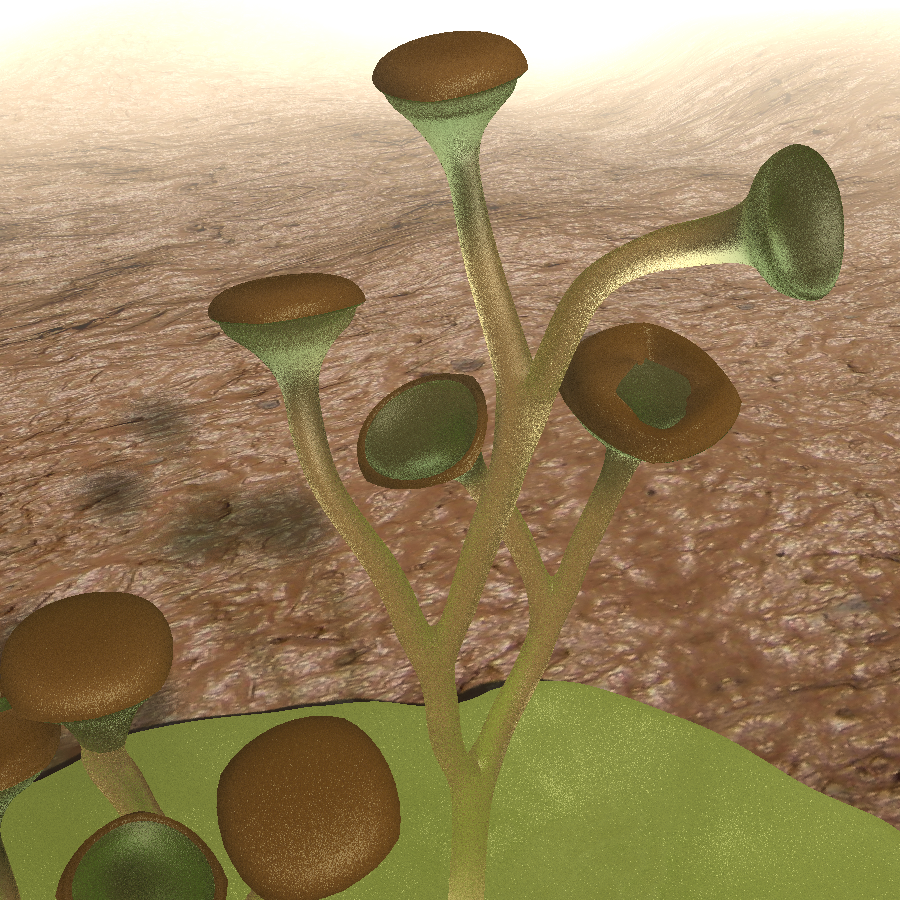
- Life restoration of the Silurian-Early Devonian primitive land plant Cooksonia
  †Cooksonia – or unidentified comparable form
  - †Cooksonia hemisphaerica
- †Cordaites
  - †Cordaites principalis
- †Costellarina
  - †Costellarina carlstroemi
- †Craenena
- †Cristatisporites
- †Cromyocrinus – tentative report
- †Crurithyris
  - †Crurithyris planoconvexa
- †Cupularostrum
  - †Cupularostrum saxatilis
  - †Cupularostrum saxitalis
- †Cupulo – or unidentified comparable form
  - †Cupulo rostrum
- †Cyclocarpon
  - †Cyclocarpon angelicum – type locality for species
- †Cycloceras
  - †Cycloceras randolphensis
- †Cyclopteris
  - †Cyclopteris orbicularis
- †Cyclozyga
  - †Cyclozyga micra
- †Cylindritopsis
  - †Cylindritopsis insolitus – type locality for species
- †Cymatochiton – tentative report
  - †Cymatochiton kaibabensis – type locality for species
- †Cyperites
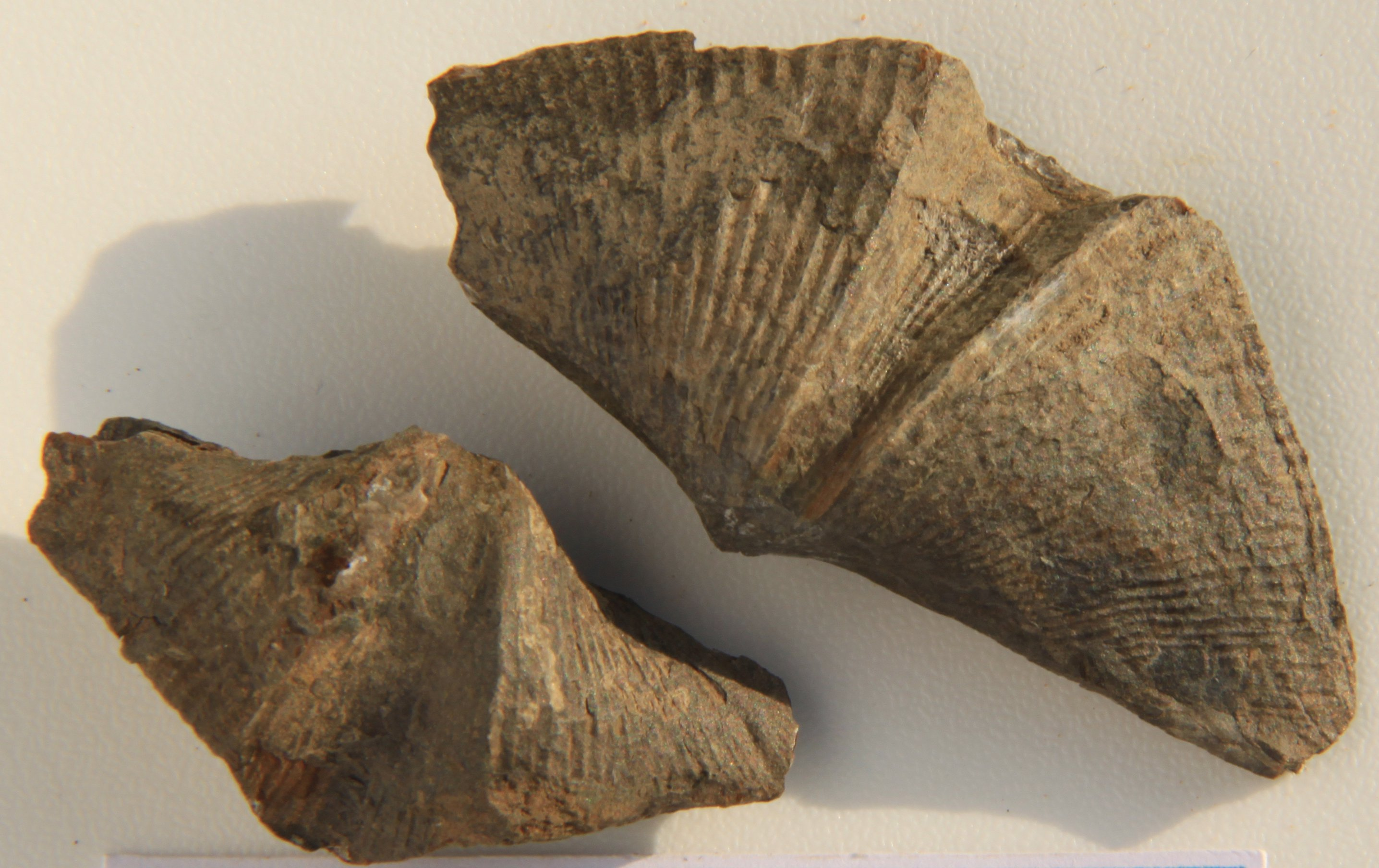
- Fossilized shells of the Middle-Late Devonian brachiopod Cyrtospirifer
  †Cyrtospirifer
  - †Cyrtospirifer kindlei
  - †Cyrtospirifer whitneyi
- †Cystodictya

== D ==
- †Daubreeia
- †Delaria
  - †Delaria sevilloidia – type locality for species
  - †Delaria snowi
- †Delocrinus
- †Deltodus
  - †Deltodus angularis
  - †Deltodus mercurei
  - †Deltodus sublaevis
- †Deltopecten
  - †Deltopecten monroensis
  - †Deltopecten tahlequahensis
- †Derbyia
  - †Derbyia crassa
  - †Derbyia robusta – or unidentified comparable form
- †Diablodontus – type locality for genus
  - †Diablodontus michaeledmundi – type locality for species
- †Diaphragmus
  - †Diaphragmus fasciculatus
- †Dichotrypa
  - †Dichotrypa elegans
- †Dicromyocrinus
  - †Dicromyocrinus beusi – type locality for species
  - †Dicromyocrinus carrizoensis – type locality for species
- †Dictyoclostus
  - †Dictyoclostus arcuatus
- †Dictyonina
- †Dielasma
  - †Dielasma burlingtonensis
  - †Dielasma formosum
  - †Dielasma illinoisense
  - †Dielasma shumardanum
  - †Dielasma sinuatum
- †Dielasmoides
  - †Dielasmoides bisinuatus
- †Disphyllum
- †Ditomopyge
- †Donaldina
- †Donaldospira
  - †Donaldospira geminocarinata – type locality for species
- †Dyoros
  - †Dyoros kaibabensis
  - †Dyoros subliratus

== E ==
- †Echinaria
  - †Echinaria semipunctata
- †Echinauris
  - †Echinauris newberryi
  - †Echinauris subhorrida
- †Echinoconchus
  - †Echinoconchus biseriatus
  - †Echinoconchus elegans
  - †Echinoconchus rodeoensis
- †Echinocrinus
  - †Echinocrinus dininnii – or unidentified related form
  - †Echinocrinus trudifer
- †Edmondia
  - †Edmondia crassa
  - †Edmondia fountainensis
  - †Edmondia genevievensis
  - †Edmondia gibbosa – or unidentified comparable form
- †Eirmocrinus
  - †Eirmocrinus brewi – type locality for species
- †Elasmonema
- †Elfridia – type locality for genus
  - †Elfridia bulbidens – type locality for species
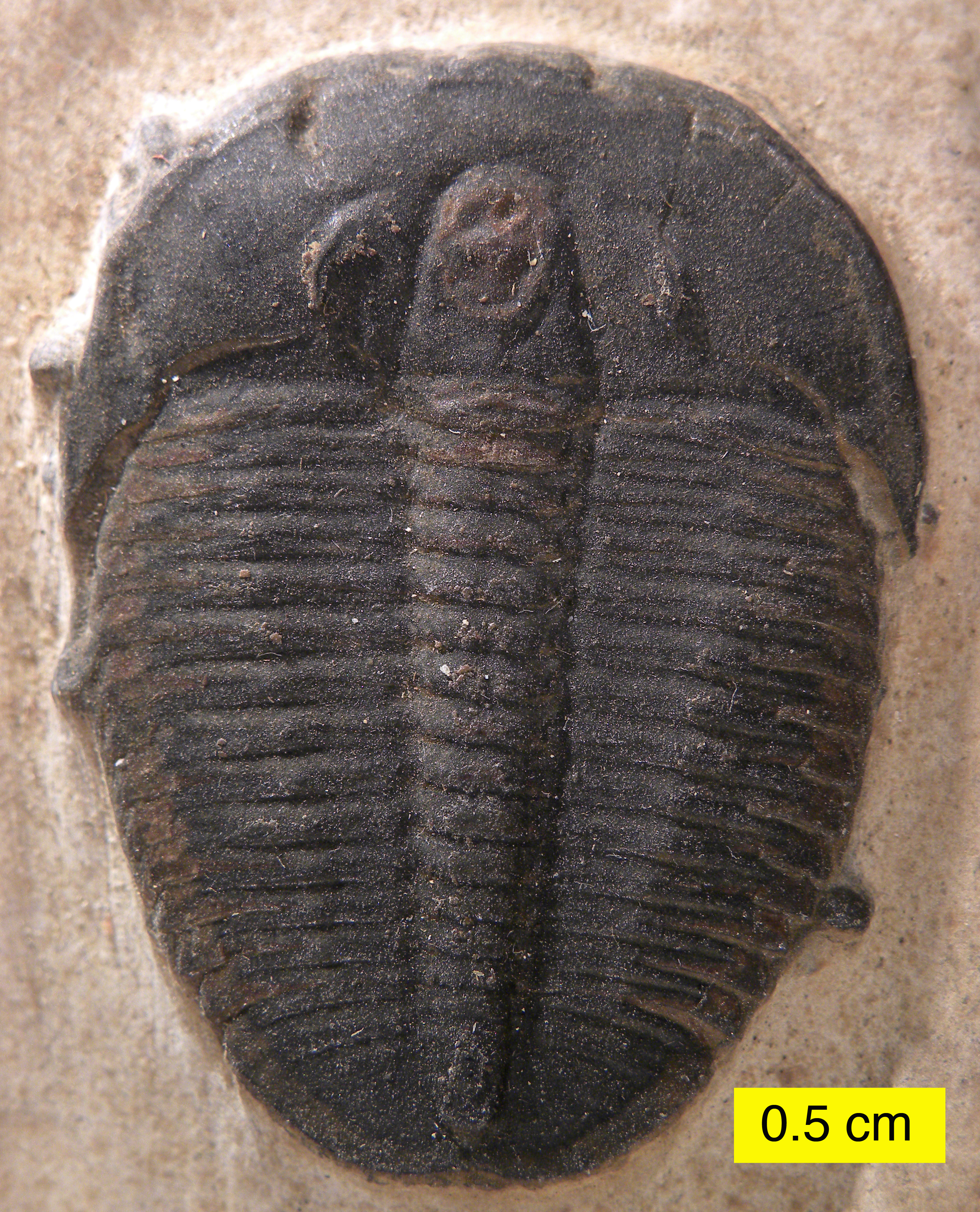
- Fossil of the Cambrian trilobite Elrathia
  †Elrathia
- †Eltovaria
  - †Eltovaria bursiformis – type locality for species
- †Endelocrinus
- †Endosporites
- †Ensiferites
  - †Ensiferites brandenburgi – type locality for species
- †Eoastarte
  - †Eoastarte subcircularis
- Eocaudina
  - †Eocaudina marginata
- †Eocrinus
- †Eomarginifera
  - †Eomarginifera adairensis
- †Eridopora
  - †Eridopora macrostoma
  - †Eridopora occidentalis
- †Euconoapira
- †Euconospira
  - †Euconospira cryptolirata – type locality for species
  - †Euconospira missouriensis – or unidentified comparable form
- †Eumetria
  - †Eumetria vera
  - †Eumetria verneuilana
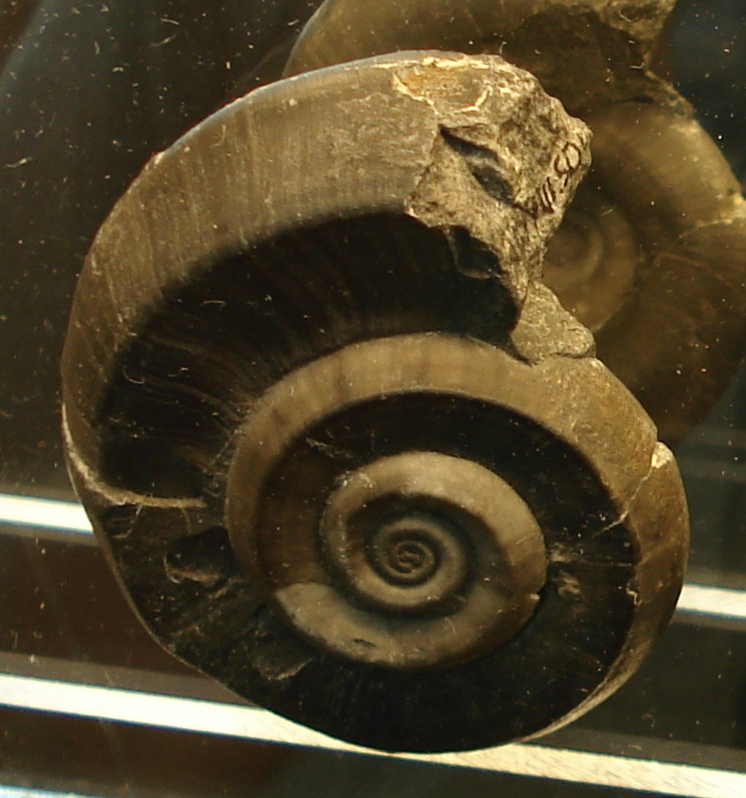
- Fossilized shell of the Silurian-Permian sea snail Euomphalus
  †Euomphalus
  - †Euomphalus cornudanus
  - †Euomphalus kaibabensis – type locality for species
  - †Euomphalus similis
  - †Euomphalus spergenense
  - †Euomphalus subplanus
  - †Euomphalus utahensis
- †Euphemites
  - †Euphemites aequisulcatus – type locality for species
  - †Euphemites lentiformus
- †Euphemitopsis
  - †Euphemitopsis multinodosa
  - †Euphemitopsis subpapillosa

== F ==
- †Fenestella
  - †Fenestella morrowensis
  - †Fenestella multispinosa
- †Fistulipora
- †Flexaria
- †Florinites
- †Floweria
  - †Floweria chemungensis
  - †Floweria prava
- †Frnestella
  - †Frnestella serratula
  - †Frnestella tenax
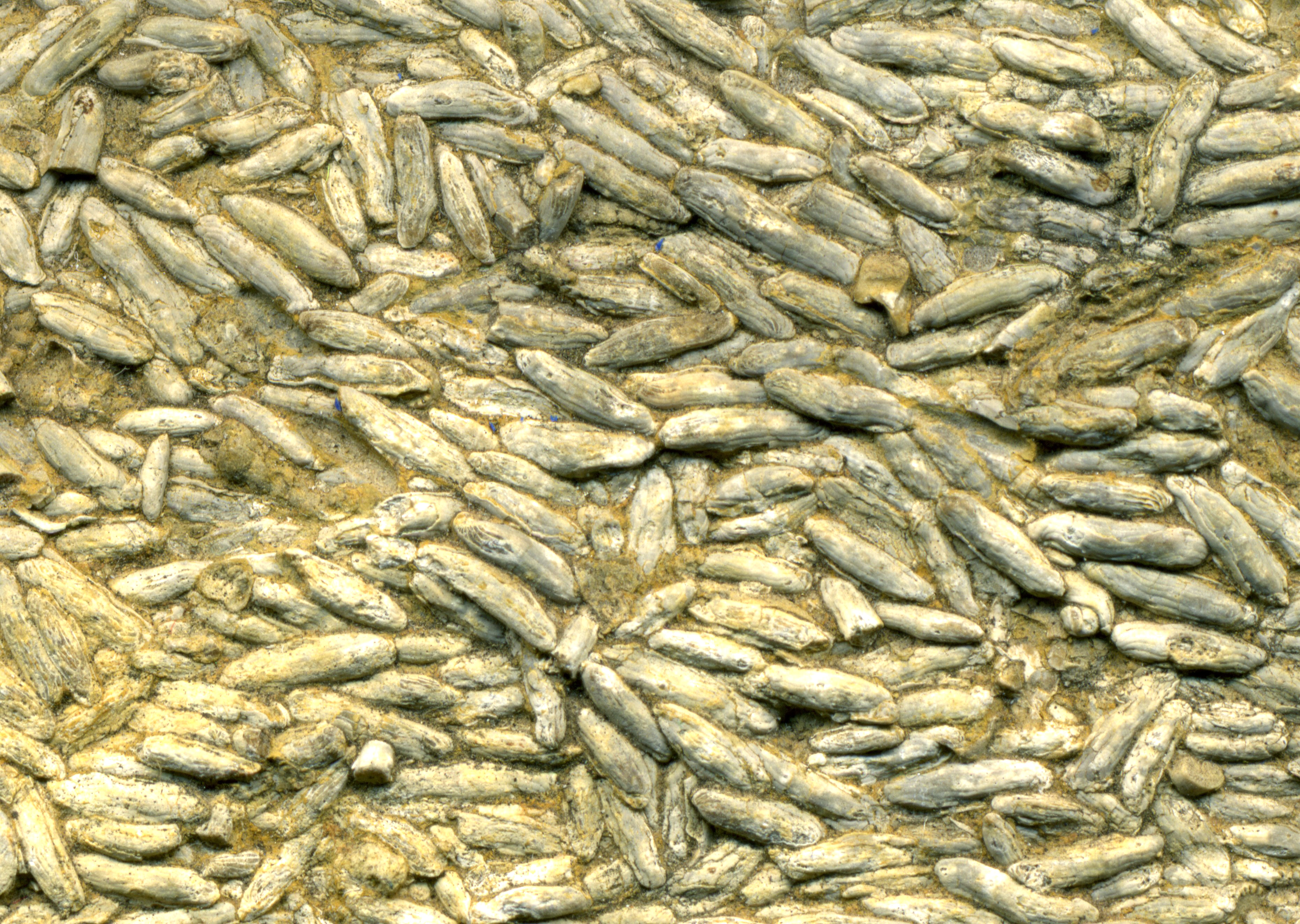
- Assemblage of fossils of Silurian-Permian fusulinid foraminiferans
  †Fusulina
  - †Fusulina socorroensis

== G ==
- †Gamphalosia
- †Gingkophytopsis
- †Girtyella
  - †Girtyella brevilobata
  - †Girtyella indianensis
- †Girtypora
  - †Girtypora maculata – type locality for species
- †Girtyspira
- †Glabrocingulum
  - †Glabrocingulum coronatum – type locality for species
  - †Glabrocingulum gibber – type locality for species
  - †Glabrocingulum laeviliratum – type locality for species
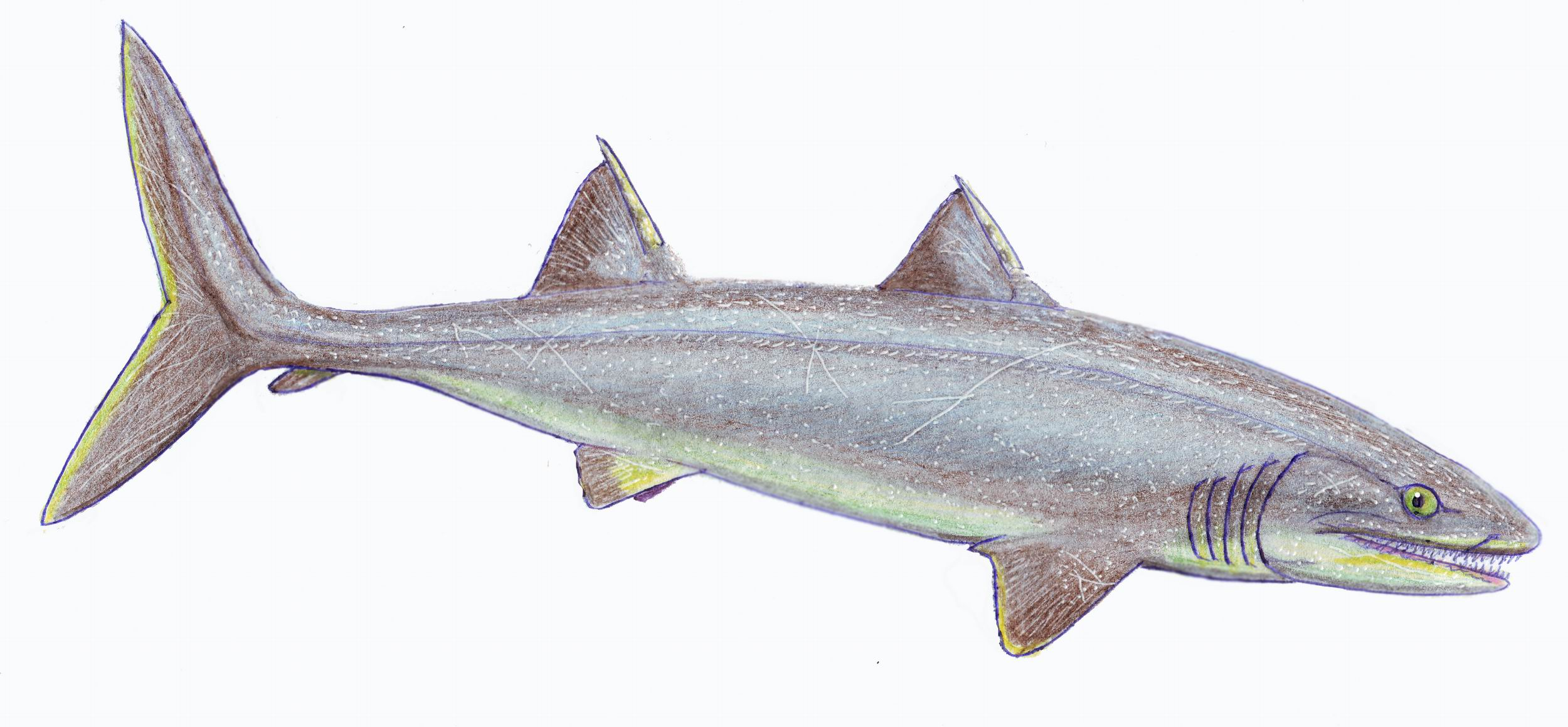
- Life restoration of the Carboniferous shark Glikmanius
  †Glikmanius
  - †Glikmanius myachkovensis
  - †Glikmanius occidentalis
- †Globular
  - †Globular eocrinoid – tentative report
- †Glossopleura
- †Glyphaspis
  - †Glyphaspis tecta
- †Glyptopora
- †Glyptospira – type locality for genus
  - †Glyptospira cristulata – type locality for species
  - †Glyptospira huecoensis
- †Glyptotomaria
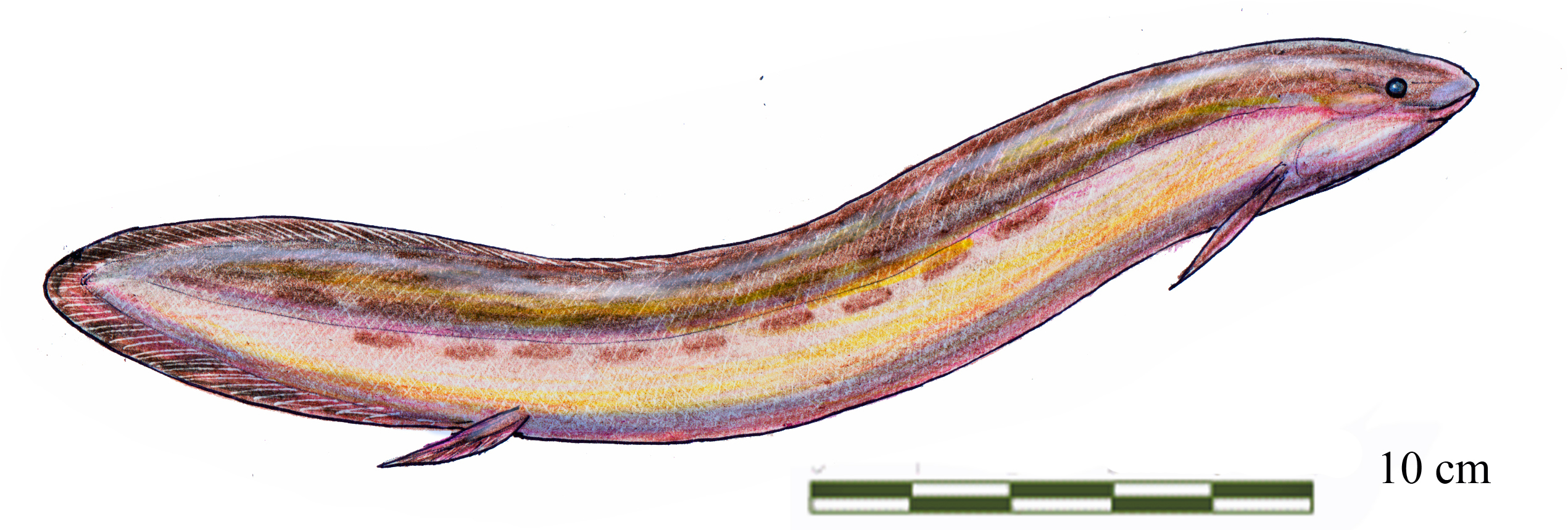
- Life restoration of the Permian lungfish Gnathorhiza
  †Gnathorhiza – or unidentified comparable form
  - †Gnathorhiza serrata
- †Gomphostrobus
  - †Gomphostrobus bifidus
  - †Gomphostrobus G. bifidus – or unidentified comparable form
- †Goniasma
  - †Goniasma terebra
- †Goniophora
  - †Goniophora cristata – type locality for species
- †Grammatodon
  - †Grammatodon politus
- †Gymnospermous
- †Gypidula

== H ==
- †Haplistion
  - †Haplistion armstrongi
- †Hastimima – tentative report
- †Hedeia
- †Heslerodus
  - †Heslerodus divergens
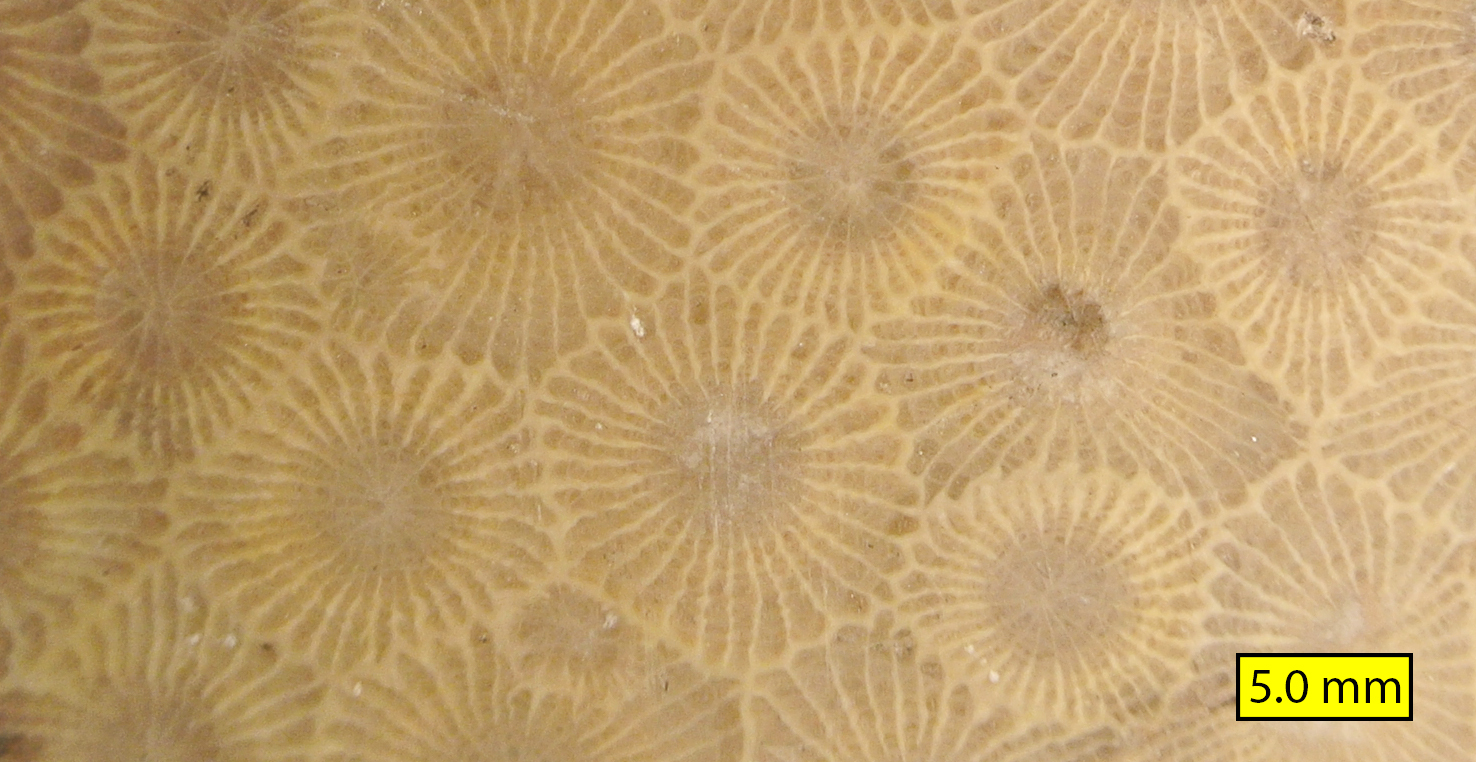
- Fossil of the Devonian colonial rugose coral Hexagonaria, also known as a Petoskey stone
  †Hexagonaria
  - †Hexagonaria minuta
  - †Hexagonaria occidens
  - †Hexagonaria palmeri
- †Hostimella
  - †Hostimella hostimensis
- †Hustedia
- †Hyolithes

== I ==
- †Ianthinopsis
- †Icriodus
  - †Icriodus brevis
- †Idiognathodus
  - †Idiognathodus delicatus
  - †Idiognathodus humerus
- †Indospirifer
  - †Indospirifer orestes
- †Iowaphyllum
  - †Iowaphyllum johanni
  - †Iowaphyllum nisbeti

== J ==
- †Janeia

== K ==
- †Kaibabella – type locality for genus
  - †Kaibabella curvilenata – type locality for species
- †Kaibabvenator – type locality for genus
  - †Kaibabvenator swiftae – type locality for species
- †Kingopora
  - †Kingopora portalensis
- †Kinishbia – type locality for genus
  - †Kinishbia nodosa – type locality for species
- †Knorria
- †Knoxisporites
- †Kochina – tentative report
  - †Kochina angustata
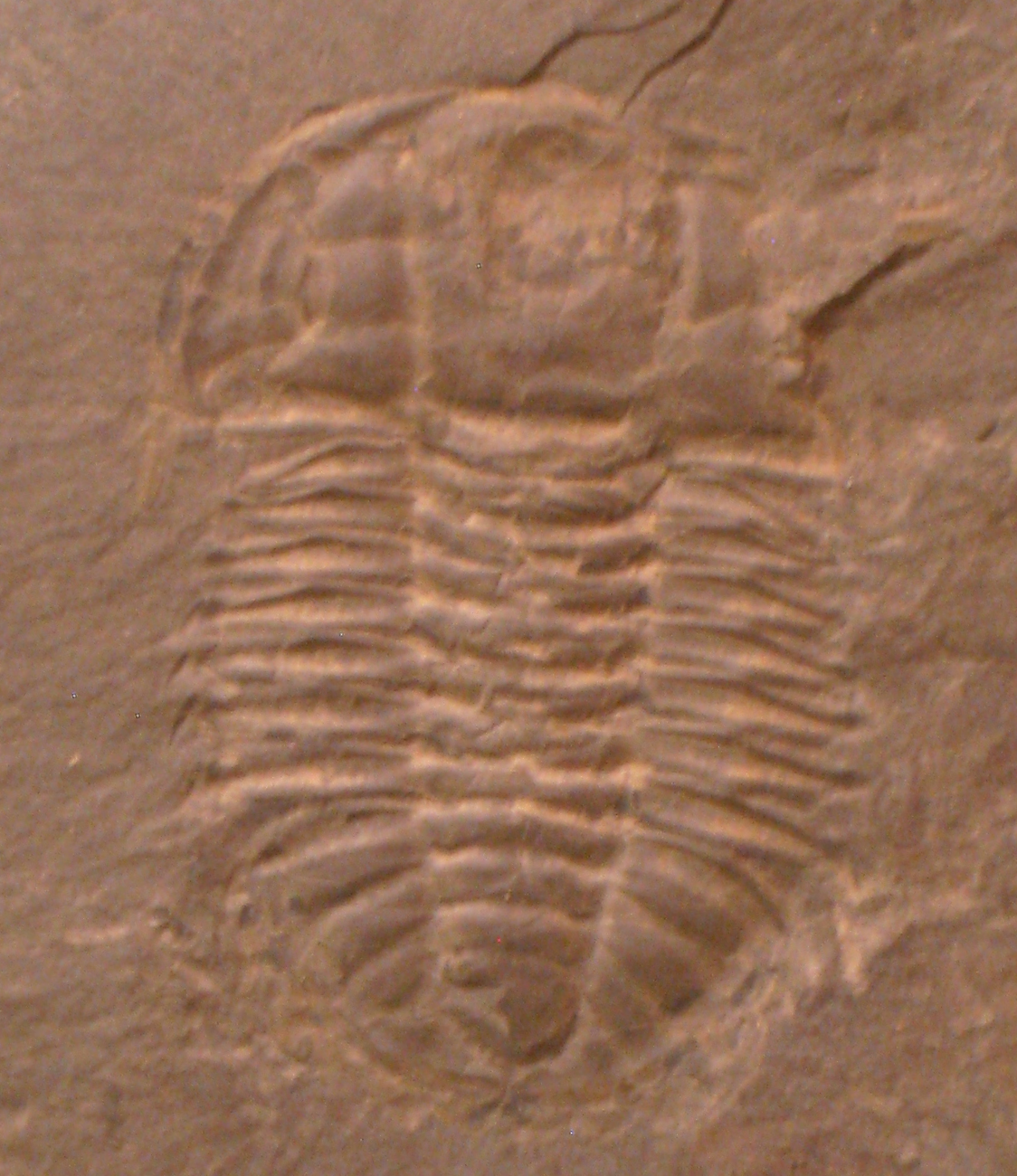
- Fossil of the Cambrian trilobite Kootenia
  †Kootenia
  - †Kootenia mckeei
- †Kutorginella
  - †Kutorginella meridionalis

== L ==
- †Laevigatosporites
- †Lagarodus
  - †Lagarodus angustus
- †Leioproductus
  - †Leioproductus plicatus
- †Lepetopsis – or unidentified comparable form
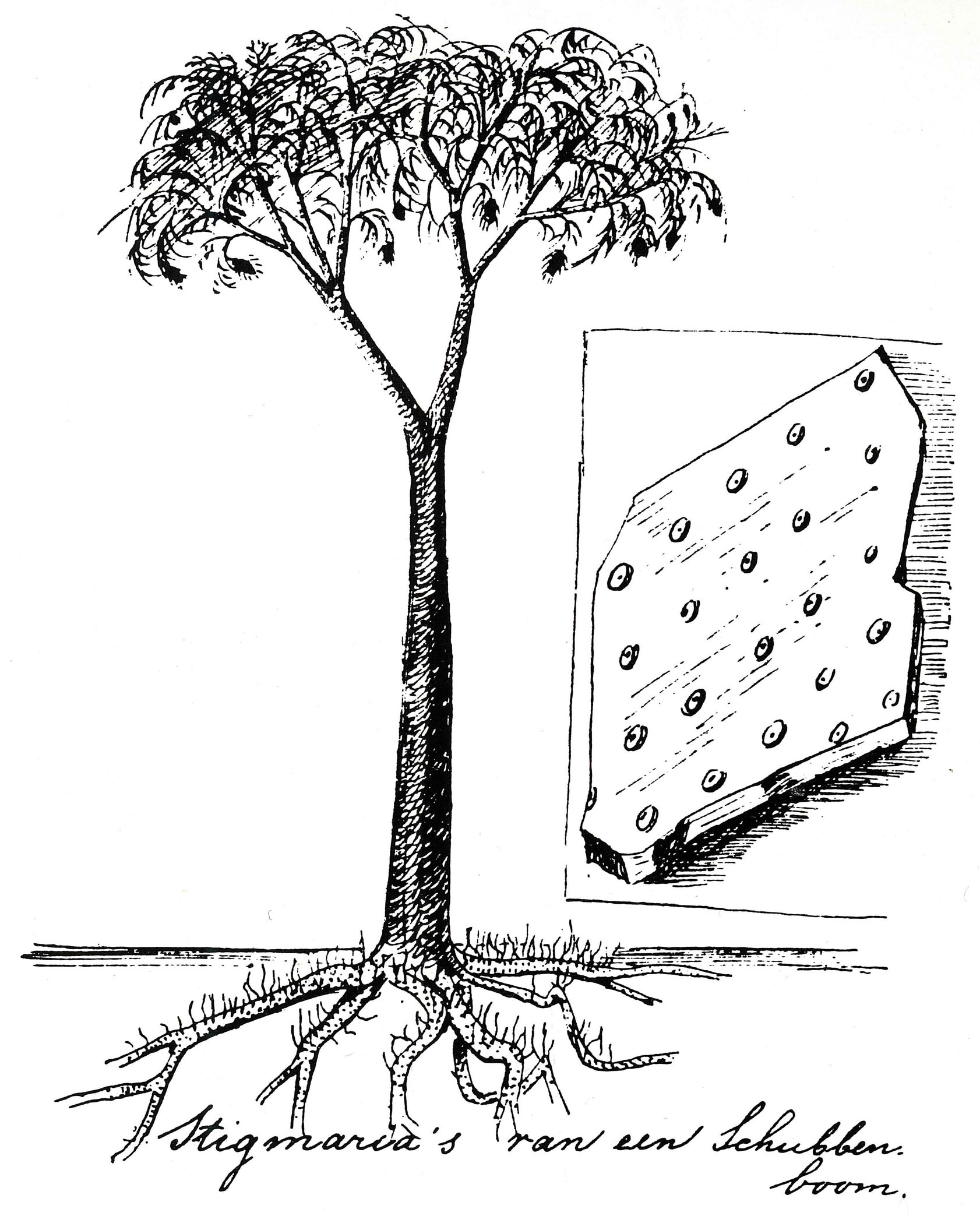
- Restoration of the Carboniferous-Late Triassic club moss relative Lepidodendron. Eli Heimans (1911).
  †Lepidodendron
  - †Lepidodendron aculeatum
  - †Lepidodendron mannabachense
  - †Lepidodendron volkmannianum
- †Lepidostrobophyllum
- †Lepidostrobus
  - †Lepidostrobus ornatus – or unidentified comparable form
- †Leptalosia
- †Leptodesma
  - †Leptodesma carboniferum
  - †Leptodesma robustum
- †Levidentalium
- †Lingula
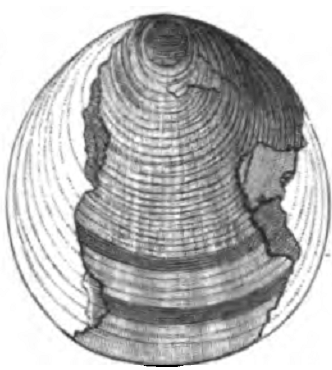
- Illustration of a fossilized shell of the Cambrian-Late Ordovician brachiopod Lingulella
  †Lingulella
  - †Lingulella kanabensis
  - †Lingulella zetus
- †Linoproductus
  - †Linoproductus altonensis
  - †Linoproductus gallatinensis
  - †Linoproductus nodosus
  - †Linoproductus ovatus
  - †Linoproductus prattenianus
  - †Linoproductus pumilis
- †Liroceras
- †Lissochonetes
- †Lophamplexus – tentative report
- †Lophophyllum – report made of unidentified related form or using admittedly obsolete nomenclature

== M ==
- †Manzanella
  - †Manzanella cryptodentata
- †Marginifera – tentative report
- †Meekella
  - †Meekella occidentalis – type locality for species
- †Meekopinna
  - †Meekopinna sagitta – type locality for species
- †Meekopora
  - †Meekopora parilis
- †Meekospira
  - †Meekospira knighti – type locality for species
  - †Meekospira sulcata – type locality for species
- †Megactenopetalus – type locality for genus
  - †Megactenopetalus kaibabanus – type locality for species
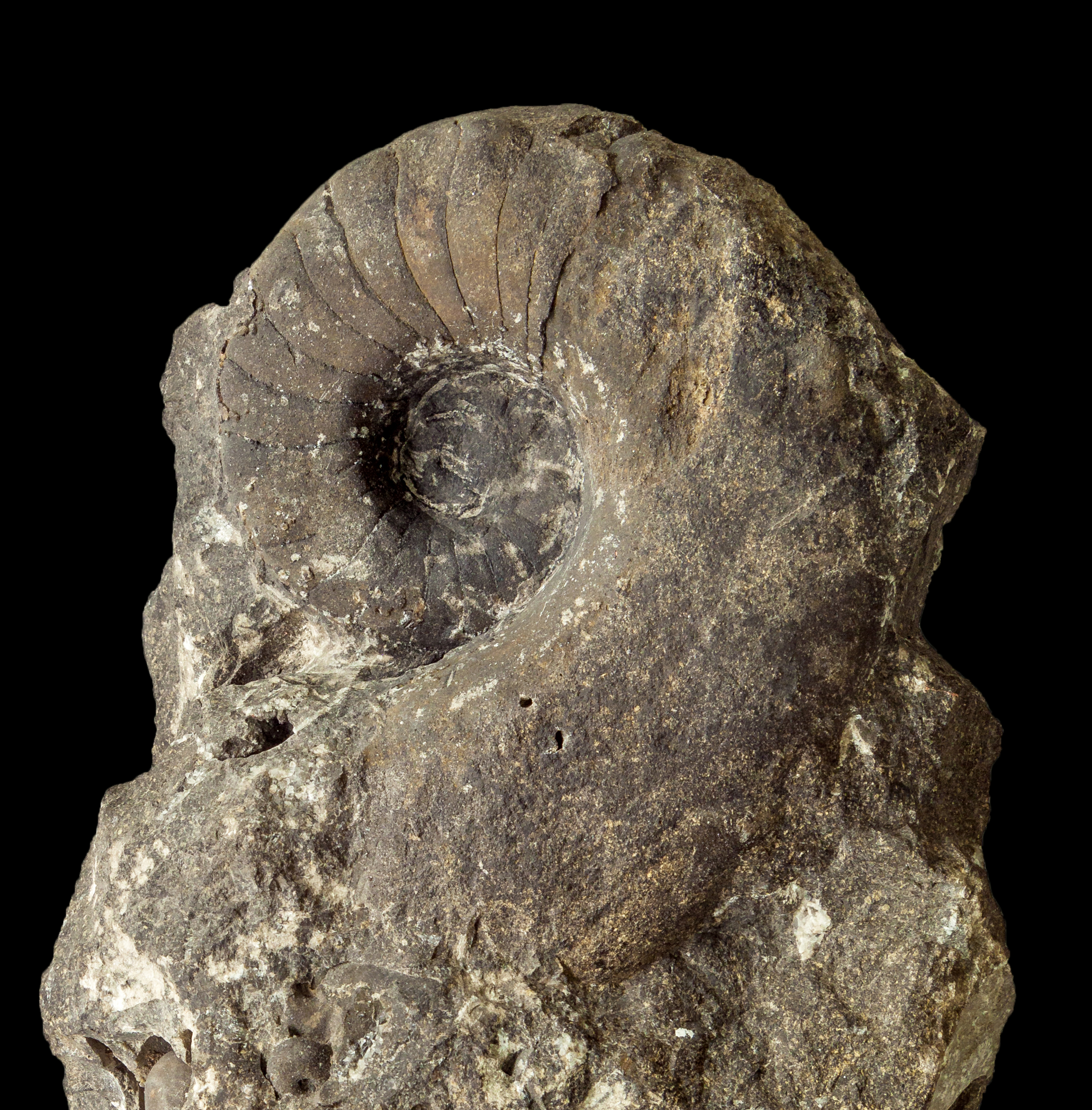
- Fossilized shell of the Carboniferous-Permian nautiloid cephalopod Metacoceras
  †Metacoceras
  - †Metacoceras bowmani – type locality for species
  - †Metacoceras unklesbayi – type locality for species
- †Metacromyocrinus
  - †Metacromyocrinus holdenvillensis – or unidentified comparable form
- †Michelina
- †Microdoma
- †Microreticulatisporites
- †Modiolus
  - †Modiolus fountainensis
  - †Modiolus illinoiensis
- †Mourlonia – tentative report
  - †Mourlonia cancellata – type locality for species
- †Multithecopora – tentative report
- †Murchisonia
- †Myalina
  - †Myalina adunca – type locality for species
  - †Myalina angulata
  - †Myalina congeneris
  - †Myalina monroensis
  - †Myalina nacoensis – type locality for species
- †Myoconcha

== N ==
- †Nanoskalme – type locality for genus
  - †Nanoskalme natans – type locality for species
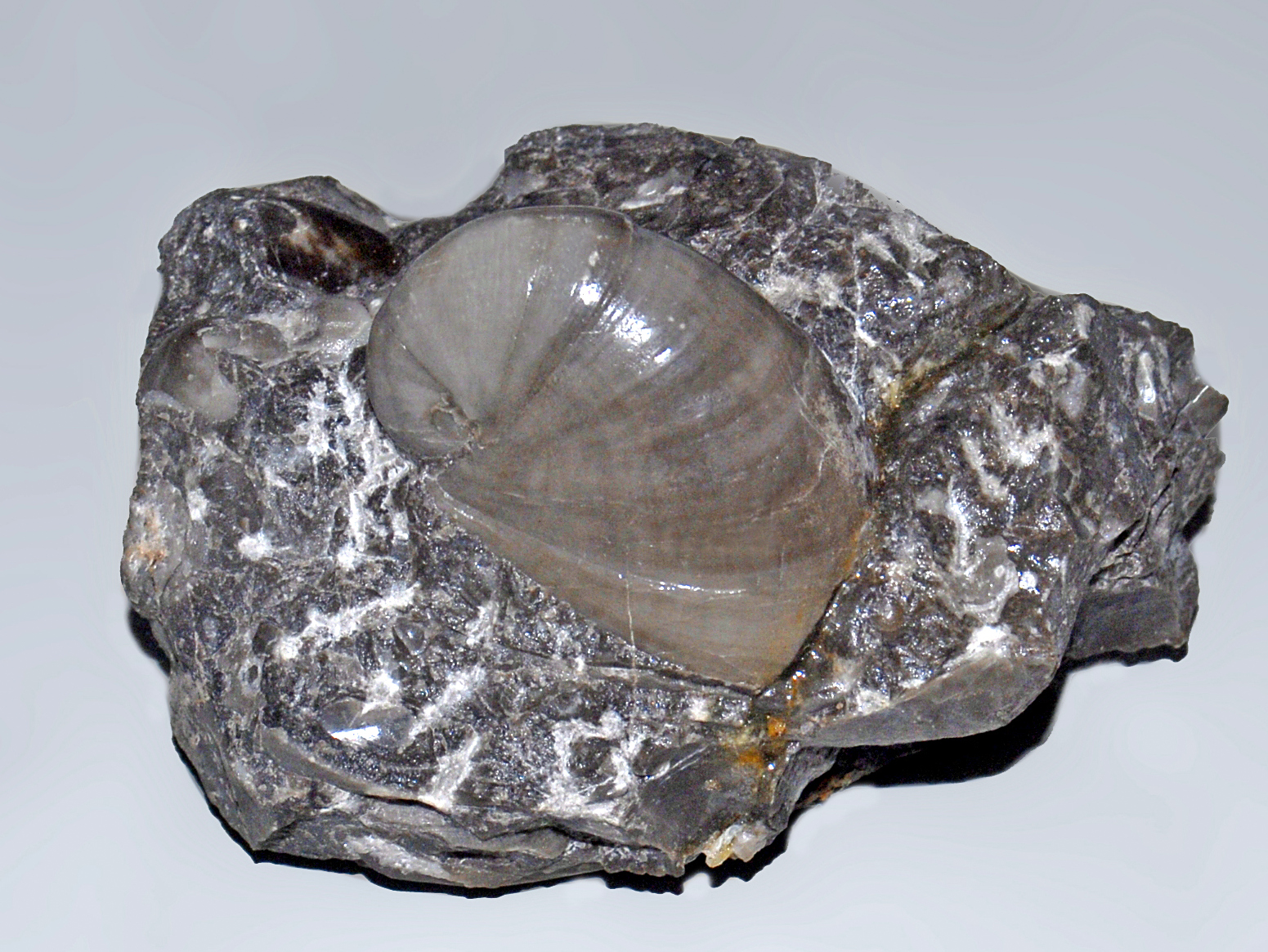
- Fossilized shell of the Early Devonian – Triassic sea snail Naticopsis
  †Naticopsis
  - †Naticopsis apachensis – type locality for species
  - †Naticopsis kaibabensis – type locality for species
  - †Naticopsis permica – type locality for species
  - †Naticopsis waterlooensis
- †Neosaivodus – type locality for genus
  - †Neosaivodus flagstaffensis – type locality for species
- †Neospirifer – tentative report
  - †Neospirifer dunbari
- †Neuropteridium – tentative report
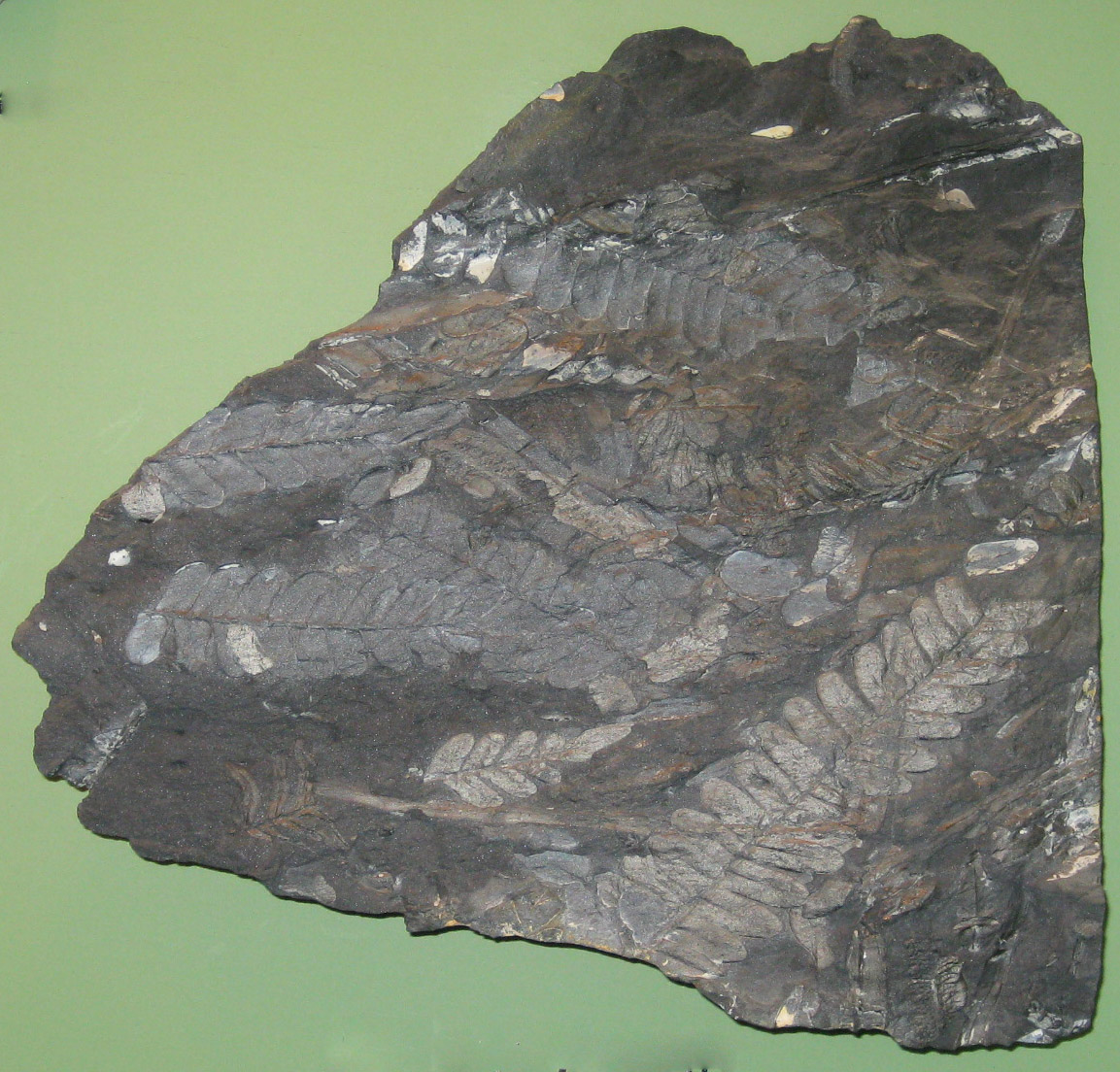
- Fronds of the Carboniferous seed fern Neuropteris
  †Neuropteris
  - †Neuropteris heterophylla
  - †Neuropteris missouriensis
  - †Neuropteris scheuchzeri
- †Nisusia
  - †Nisusia kanabensis
  - †Nisusia noblei
- †Novoameura
  - †Novoameura mckeei – type locality for species
- Nucula
  - †Nucula illinoisensis
  - †Nucula platynotus
  - †Nucula randolphensis
- Nuculana
  - †Nuculana curta
- †Nuculavus
  - †Nuculavus levatiformis
- †Nuculopsis

== O ==
- †Odontopteris
  - †Odontopteris schlotheimii
  - †Odontopteris schlotheimiii
- †Olenellus
- †Omphalotrochus
  - †Omphalotrochus cochisensis
  - †Omphalotrochus hessensis
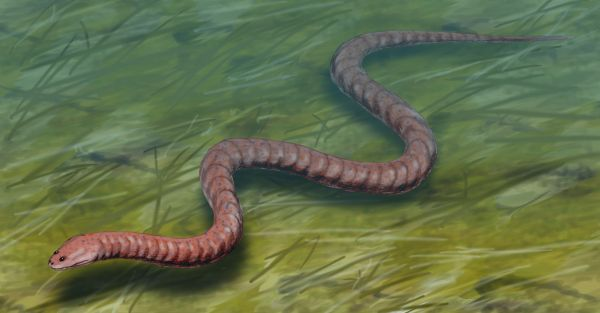
- Life restoration of the Carboniferous-Permian amphibian Ophiderpeton
  †Ophiderpeton
  - †Ophiderpeton swisshelmense – type locality for species
- †Orbiculoidea
  - †Orbiculoidea meekana
  - †Orbiculoidea missouriensis – or unidentified comparable form
- †Oriocrassatella
- †Orodus
- †Orthacanthus
  - †Orthacanthus donnelljohnsi – type locality for species
- †Orthonema
  - †Orthonema striatonodosum – type locality for species
- †Orthonychia
  - †Orthonychia striatulus
- †Orthotetes
  - †Orthotetes kaskaskiensis
  - †Orthotetes keokuk
  - †Orthotetes subglobosus
- †Ozawainella – tentative report
  - †Ozawainella inflata

== P ==
- †Pachyaspis
- †Pachyphyllum
  - †Pachyphyllum woodmani
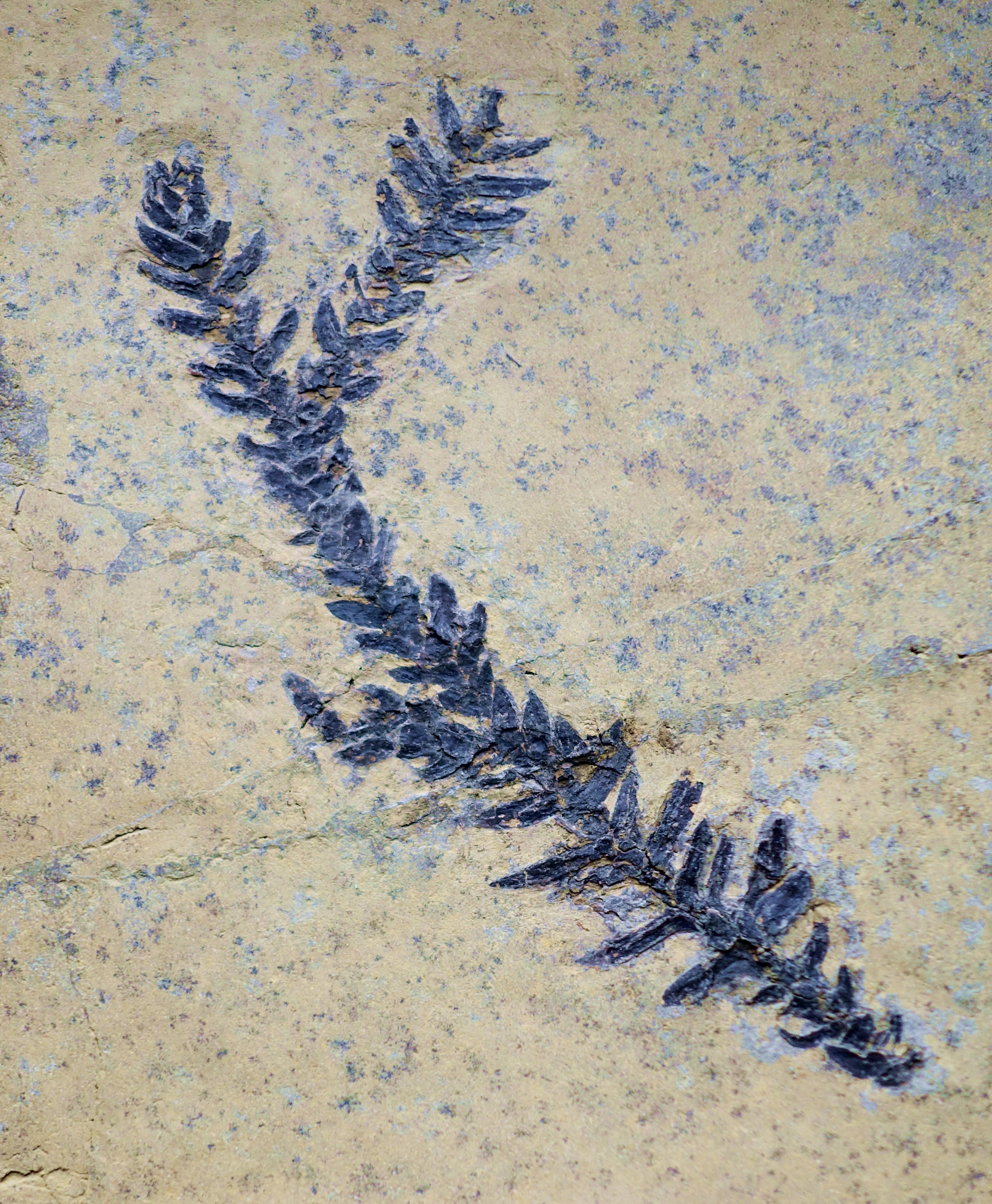
- Fossilized foliage of the Carboniferous-Late Cretaceous plant Pagiophyllum
  †Pagiophyllum
  - †Pagiophyllum dubium – type locality for species
- †Paladin
- †Palaeocapulus
  - †Palaeocapulus acutirostre
- †Palaeolima
  - †Palaeolima chesterensis
  - †Palaeolima retifera – or unidentified comparable form
- †Palaeoneilo
- †Palaeostachya
- †Palaeostylus
  - †Palaeostylus giganticus – type locality for species
- †Paleotaxites – type locality for genus
  - †Paleotaxites praecursor – type locality for species
- †Paleyoldia
  - †Paleyoldia pumilis
- †Palmatolepis
  - †Palmatolepis triangularis
- †Paraconularia
  - †Paraconularia kohli – type locality for species
- †Paradelocrinus
  - †Paradelocrinus nederi
- †Parajuresania
  - †Parajuresania nebrascensis
- †Parallelodon
  - †Parallelodon anaklastum – type locality for species
  - †Parallelodon illinoisensis
  - †Parallelodon minima
- †Paraparchites
- †Parapenascoceras
  - †Parapenascoceras rotundatum
  - †Parapenascoceras sanandreasense – or unidentified comparable form
- †Parasmithiphyllum
  - †Parasmithiphyllum breviseptatum
- †Parehmania
  - †Parehmania nitida
- †Paterina
  - †Paterina crenistria
- †Paurorhyncha
  - †Paurorhyncha cooperi
  - †Paurorhyncha endlichi
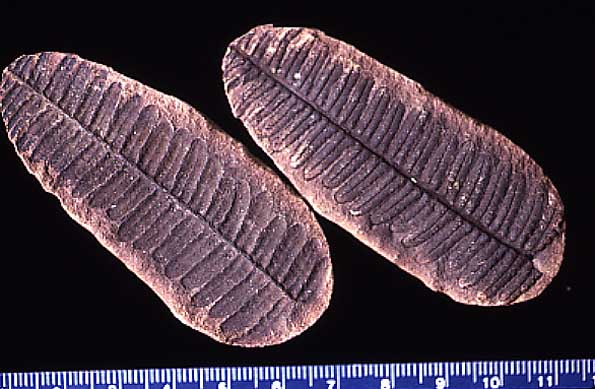
- Fossils of the Late Devonian-Permian fern-like fronds Pecopteris
  †Pecopteris
  - †Pecopteris aspera – or unidentified comparable form
  - †Pecopteris cyathea
  - †Pecopteris lamuriana
- †Penascoceras
  - †Penascoceras bradyi – type locality for species
- †Peneckiella
- †Peniculauris
  - †Peniculauris bassi
  - †Peniculauris ivesi
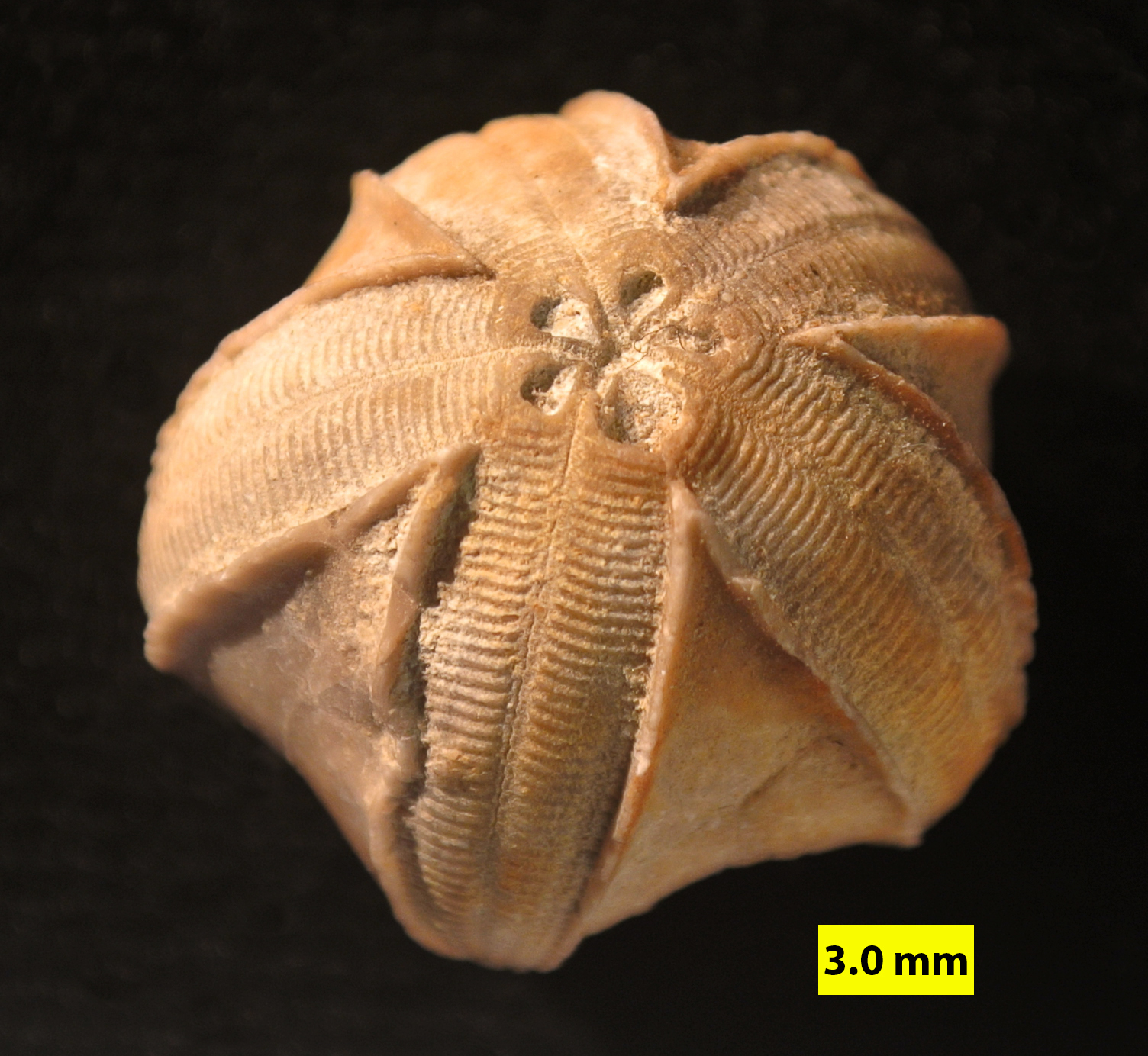
- Fossilized theca of the Carboniferous blastoid echinoderm ("sea bud") Pentremites
  †Pentremites
- †Permophorus
  - †Permophorus albequus
  - †Permophorus mexicanus – or unidentified comparable form
  - †Permophorus subcostatus – tentative report
- †Pernotrochus – type locality for genus
  - †Pernotrochus arizonensis – type locality for species
- †Perrinites
  - †Perrinites hilli
- †Petalodus
  - †Petalodus ohioensis
- †Petrodus
  - †Petrodus patelliformis
- †Phacellophyllum
- †Phestia
  - †Phestia perumbonata
- †Phillipsia
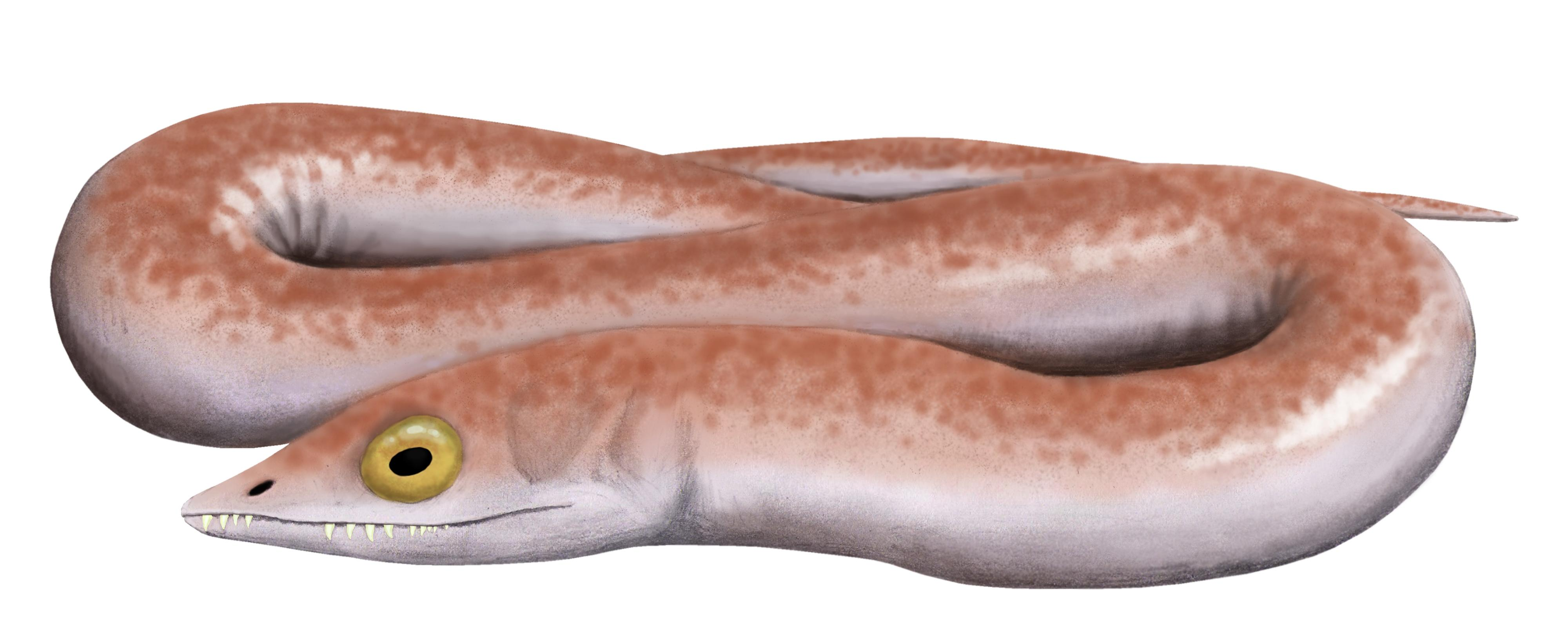
- Life restoration of the Carboniferous-Permian amphibian Phlegethontia.
  †Phlegethontia
  - †Phlegethontia phanerhapha – type locality for species
- †Phricodothyris
- †Physonemus
- †Pinna
- †Pityosporites
- †Plagioglypta
- †Planotectus – tentative report
- †Platyceras
- †Platyworthenia
  - †Platyworthenia delicata
- †Polidevcia
  - †Polidevcia obesa
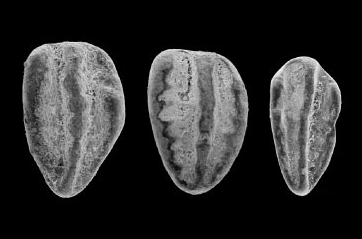
- Various conodont elements of Polygnathus
  †Polygnathus
  - †Polygnathus angustidiscus
  - †Polygnathus normalis
- †Polypora
  - †Polypora cestriensis
  - †Polypora spinulifera
- †Pontisia
- †Popanoceras – report made of unidentified related form or using admittedly obsolete nomenclature
- †Porostictia
  - †Porostictia perchaensis
- †Potonieisporites
- †Prodentalium
  - †Prodentalium canna
- †Prodiozoptyxis
- †Productus
  - †Productus indianensis
  - †Productus inflatus
  - †Productus marginicinctus
  - †Productus scitulus
- †Promytilus
  - †Promytilus retusus – type locality for species
- †Protoconchioides
  - †Protoconchioides hermitensis – type locality for species
- †Protohaploxypinus
- †Pseudoatrypa
  - †Pseudoatrypa devoniana
- †Pseudoconocardium
- †Pseudodielasma – tentative report
- †Pseudogastrioceras – tentative report
- †Pseudomonotis
  - †Pseudomonotis likharevi – or unidentified comparable form
- †Pseudorthoceras
  - †Pseudorthoceras knoxense
- †Pseudozygopleura
  - †Pseudozygopleura knighti – type locality for species
- †Psygmophyllum
- †Ptarmigania
- †Pterinopecten
- †Ptyonius – tentative report
  - †Ptyonius olisthmonaias – type locality for species
- †Pugnoides
  - †Pugnoides ottumwa
- †Pulchratia – tentative report
  - †Pulchratia picuris
- †Punctatisporites
- †Punctospirifer
  - †Punctospirifer subtextus
  - †Punctospirifer transversus

== R ==
- †Raistrickia
- †Rectifenestella
  - †Rectifenestella tenax
- †Reticularia
  - †Reticularia gonionota
  - †Reticularia setigera
- †Reticularina
- †Retispira
  - †Retispira modesta
  - †Retispira monronensis
  - †Retispira undulata – type locality for species
- †Rhabdomeson
- †Rhineoderma
  - †Rhineoderma dinglensis
- †Rhipidomella
  - †Rhipidomella burlingtonensis
  - †Rhipidomella dubia
  - †Rhipidomella thiemei
- †Rhizomaspora
- †Rhombopora
  - †Rhombopora decipiens
  - †Rhombopora persimilis
  - †Rhombopora tenuirama
  - †Rhombopora wortheni
- †Rhomopora
- †Rhynchopora
  - †Rhynchopora illinoisensis
- †Rimmyjimina – type locality for genus
  - †Rimmyjimina arcula – type locality for species
- †Rivularites
  - †Rivularites permiensis – type locality for species
- †Rota
  - †Rota martini
- †Rotiphyllum
- †Rugatia
  - †Rugatia occidentalis
- †Rugosa

== S ==
- †Saivodus
- †Sallya – tentative report
  - †Sallya lirata – type locality for species
- †Sanguinolites
- †Scaphellina – type locality for genus
  - †Scaphellina concinna – type locality for species
- †Schizodus
  - †Schizodus amplus
  - †Schizodus batesvillensis
  - †Schizodus brannerianus
  - †Schizodus canalis
  - †Schizodus chesterensis
  - †Schizodus drpressus
  - †Schizodus supaiensis – type locality for species
  - †Schizodus texanus
- †Schizophoria
  - †Schizophoria altirostris
  - †Schizophoria australis
- †Schopfipollenites
- †Scoyenia
  - †Scoyenia gracilis – type locality for species
- †Selenimyalina
- †Septimyalina
- †Septopora
  - †Septopora cestriensis
  - †Septopora decipiens
  - †Septopora subquadrans
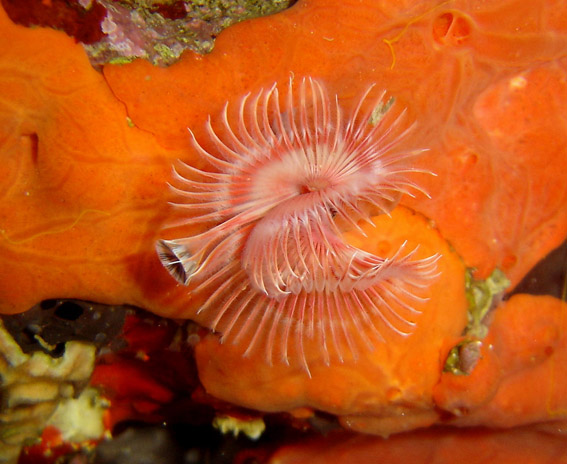
- A living Serpula, or calcareous tubeworm
  Serpula
  - †Serpula helicalis – type locality for species
- †Shansiella
  - †Shansiella beckwithana – or unidentified comparable form
- †Shark
  - †Shark teeth
- †Smithiphyllum
  - †Smithiphyllum martinense
- Solemya
  - †Solemya parallella
- †Soleniscus
  - †Soleniscus philipi – type locality for species
- †Solenomorpha – report made of unidentified related form or using admittedly obsolete nomenclature
- †Solenopleura
- †Solenopleurella
  - †Solenopleurella diligens
  - †Solenopleurella erosa
  - †Solenopleurella porcata
- †Spathognathodus
  - †Spathognathodus coloradoensis
- †Speriferina
  - †Speriferina spinosa
- †Sphenophyllum
  - †Sphenophyllum gilmorei – type locality for species
  - †Sphenophyllum oblongifolium
- †Sphenopteris
  - †Sphenopteris S. striata – or unidentified comparable form
  - †Sphenopteris striata
- †Spififer
  - †Spififer bifurcatus
- †Spinocyrtia
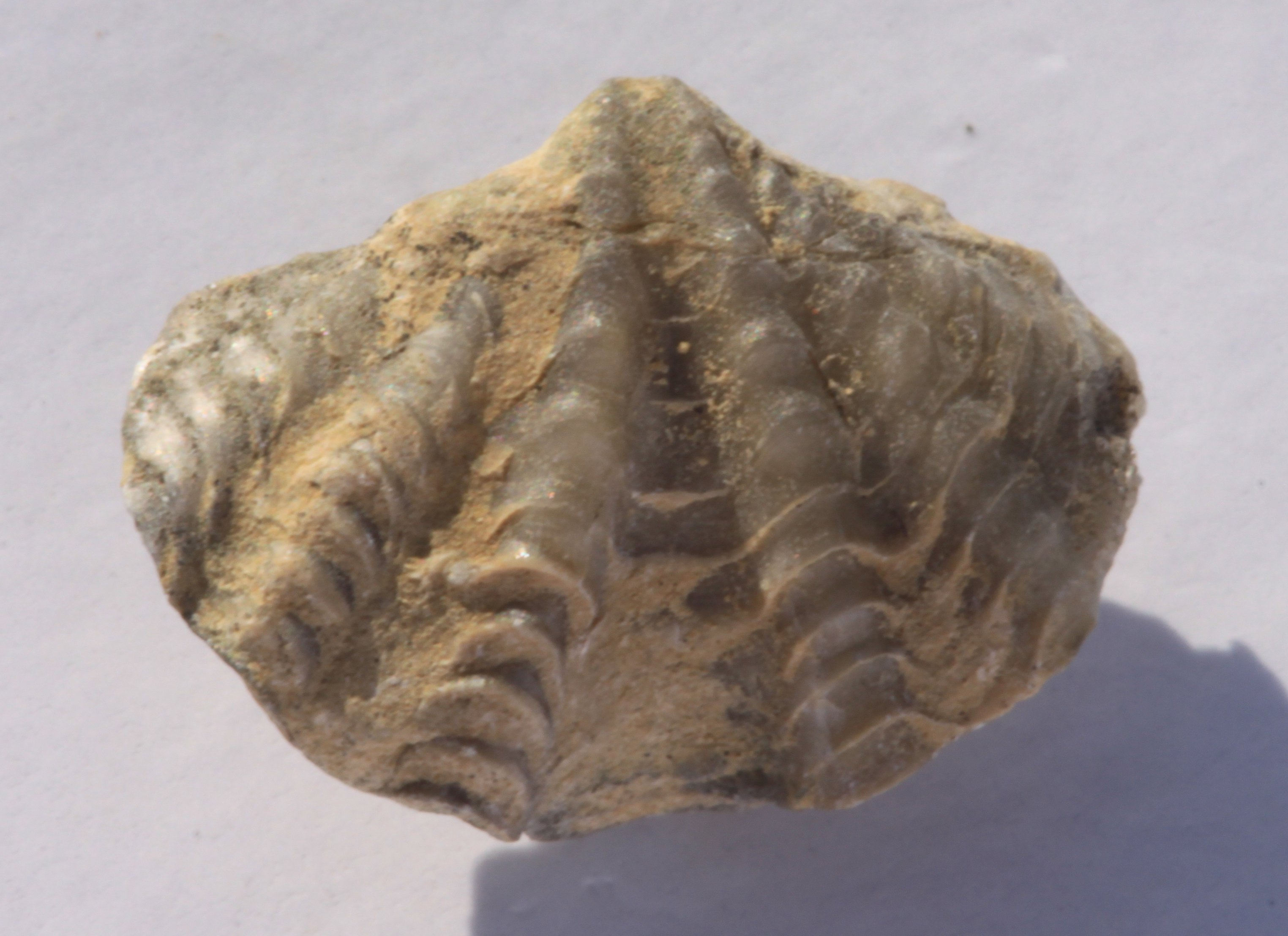
- Fossilized shell of the Late Ordovician-Late Triassic brachiopod Spirifer
  †Spirifer
  - †Spirifer arizonensis
  - †Spirifer bifurcata
  - †Spirifer bifurcatus
  - †Spirifer centronatus
  - †Spirifer pellaensis
  - †Spirifer rostellatus
  - †Spirifer tenuicostatus
- †Spiriferellina
  - †Spiriferellina hilli
- †Spiriferina
  - †Spiriferina salemensis
  - †Spiriferina spinosa
- †Squamularia – report made of unidentified related form or using admittedly obsolete nomenclature
- †Stegocoelia
  - †Stegocoelia quadricostata – type locality for species
- †Stenodiscus – tentative report
- †Stenoscisma
  - †Stenoscisma bisinuata
  - †Stenoscisma explanata
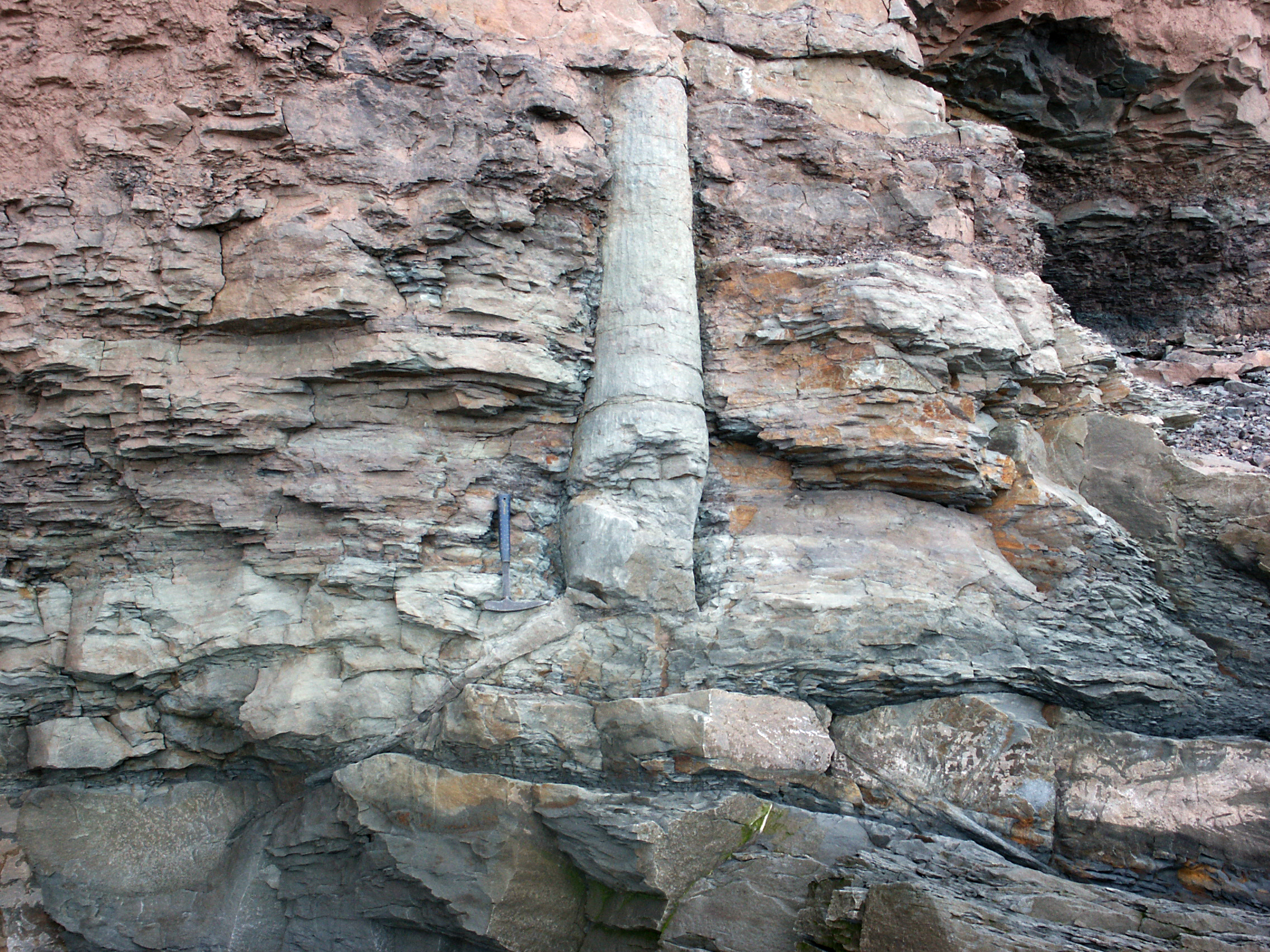
- Fossil preserved in situ of a Carboniferous tree-like club moss relative with attached Stigmaria rhizome system
  †Stigmaria
  - †Stigmaria ficoides
- †Straparollus
  - †Straparollus ophirensis
- †Streblopteria
  - †Streblopteria simpliciformis
- †Streblotrypa
  - †Streblotrypa nicklesi
- †Strianematina – type locality for genus
  - †Strianematina pulchrelirata – type locality for species
- †Striatites
- †Striatosaccites
- †Stroboceras
- †Strophonelloides
- †Strophostylus
  - †Strophostylus splendens
- †Supaia – type locality for genus
  - †Supaia anomala – type locality for species
  - †Supaia breviloba – type locality for species
  - †Supaia compacta – type locality for species
  - †Supaia linearifolia – type locality for species
  - †Supaia merriami – type locality for species
  - †Supaia rigida – type locality for species
  - †Supaia sturdevantii – type locality for species
  - †Supaia subgoepperti – type locality for species
  - †Supaia thinnfeldioides – type locality for species
- †Synarmocrinus
  - †Synarmocrinus carrizoensis – type locality for species
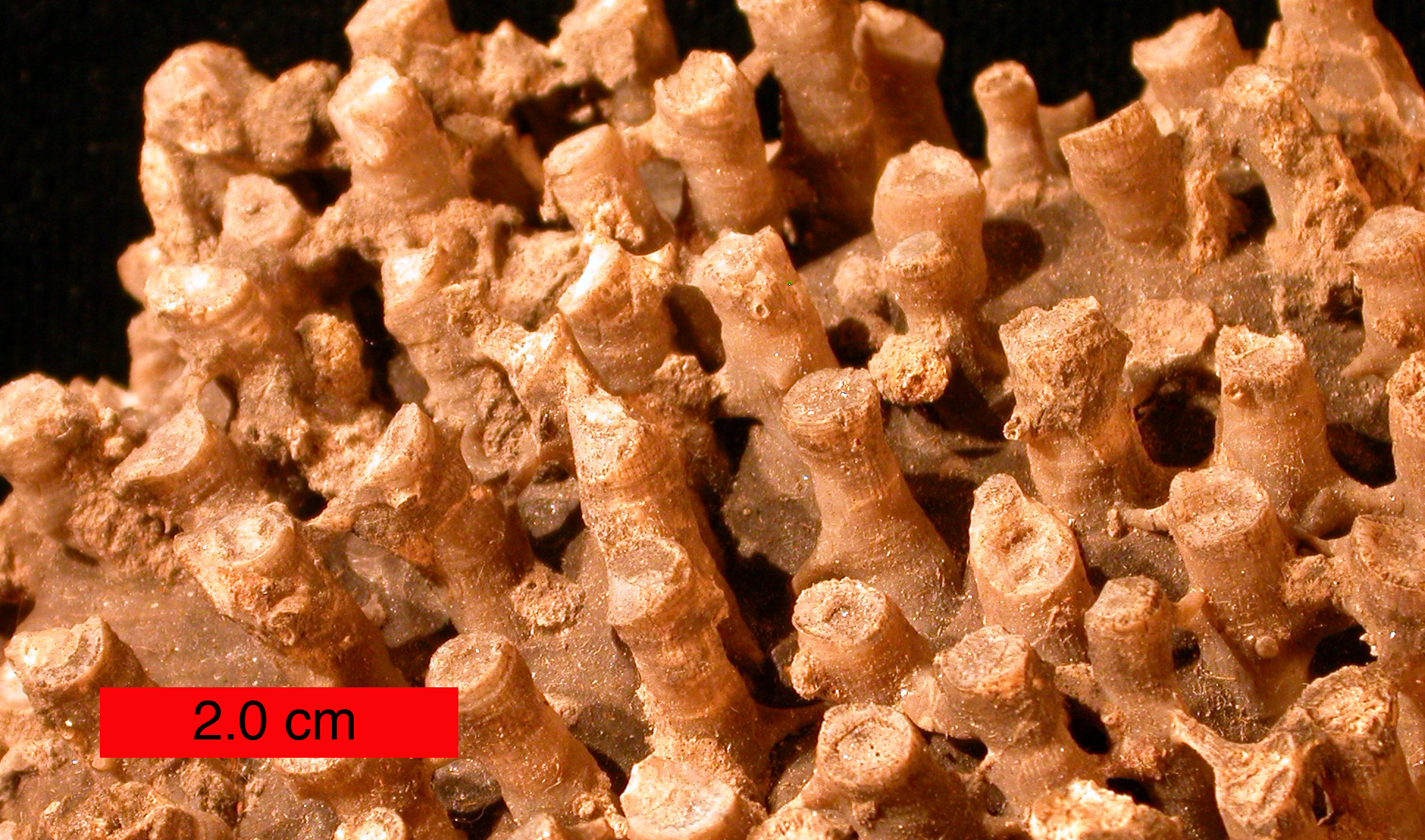
- Fossil of the Devonian tabulate coral Syringopora
  †Syringopora
- †Syringospira
  - †Syringospira prima

== T ==
- †Tabulipora
  - †Tabulipora paradisensis
  - †Tabulipora tuberculata
- †Tabulophyllum
- †Taeniopteris
  - †Taeniopteris angelica – type locality for species
  - †Taeniopteris coriacea
  - †Taeniopteris eckhardti – or unidentified comparable form
  - †Taeniopteris newberriana
  - †Taeniopteris T. newberriana – or unidentified comparable form
- †Tainoceras
  - †Tainoceras duttoni
  - †Tainoceras schellbachi – type locality for species
- †Taxites
- †Tenticospirifer
  - †Tenticospirifer cyrtinaformis
  - †Tenticospirifer cyrtinoformis
  - †Tenticospirifer cytinoformis
- †Thamniscus
  - †Thamniscus furcillatus
- †Thamnopora
- †Torynifer
  - †Torynifer spinosus
- †Trapezophyllum
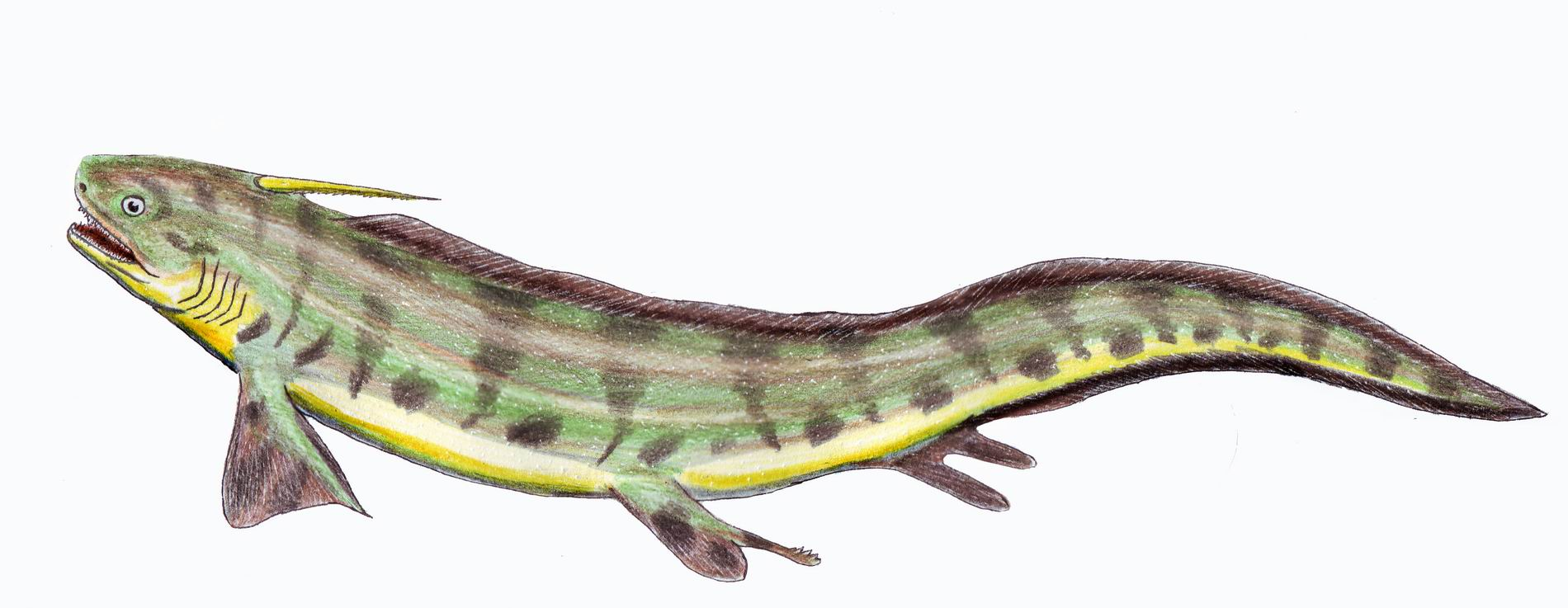
- Life restoration of the Carboniferous-Triassic freshwater shark Triodus
  †Triodus
  - †Triodus elpia – type locality for species
- †Triplophyllum
- †Triquitrites
- †Tupus
  - †Tupus gilmorei – type locality for species
  - †Tupus whitei – type locality for species
- †Turbonopsis
  - †Turbonopsis apachiensis
- †Tusayana – type locality for genus
  - †Tusayana cibola – type locality for species

== U ==
- †Ullmannia
  - †Ullmannia frumentaria

== V ==
- †Venustodus
  - †Venustodus leidyi
- †Verrucosisporites
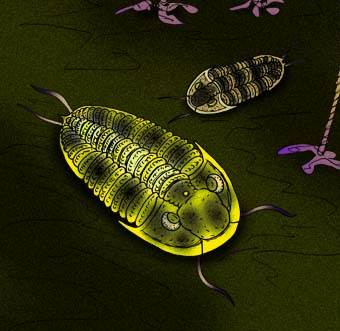
- Restoration of the Permian trilobite Vidria
  †Vidria
  - †Vidria contendens – type locality for species
- †Voltzia
  - †Voltzia dentiloba – type locality for species

== W ==
- †Waagenella
  - †Waagenella crassus
- †Waagenoconcha
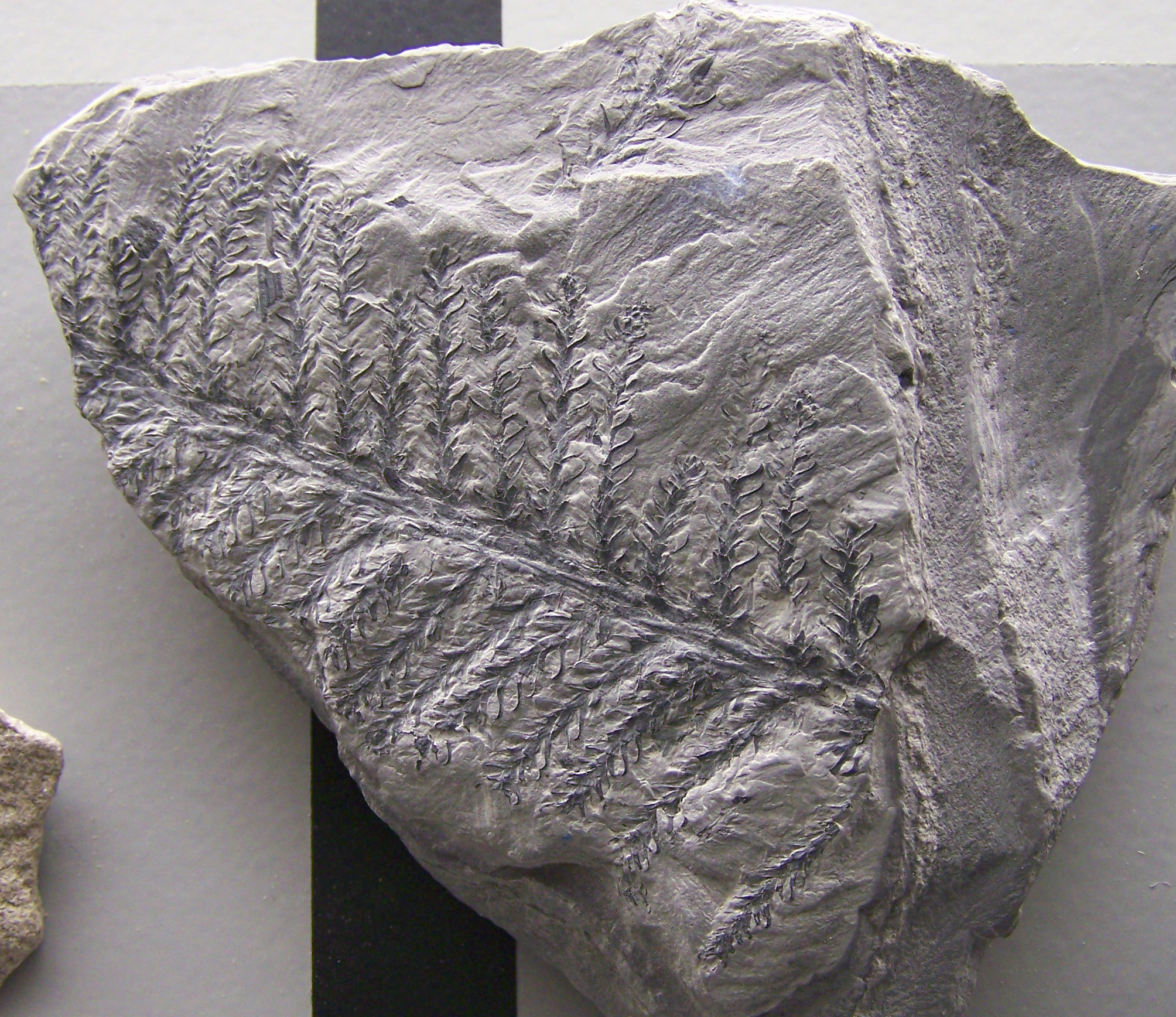
- Fossilized foliage of the Carboniferous-Permian conifer Walchia
  †Walchia
  - †Walchia dawsoni – type locality for species
  - †Walchia gracillima – type locality for species
  - †Walchia hypnoides
  - †Walchia piniformis
- †Walpia
  - †Walpia hermitensis – type locality for species
- †Wardia
- †Warthia
  - †Warthia crassus
- †Wedekindellina
  - †Wedekindellina matura – or unidentified comparable form
- †Wellerella
- †Wilkingia
  - †Wilkingia terminale
  - †Wilkingia terminalis
- †Worthenia
  - †Worthenia arizonensis – type locality for species
  - †Worthenia corrugata – type locality for species

== Y ==
- †Yakia – type locality for genus
  - †Yakia heterophylla – type locality for species
- †Yarravia
  - †Yarravia gorelovii
- Yoldia
