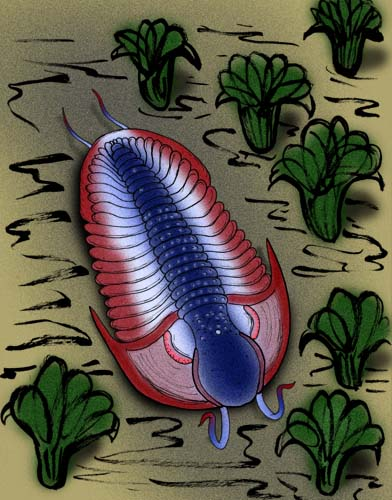
- Thaiaspis sethaputi

Scientific classification
- Kingdom: Animalia
- Phylum: Arthropoda
- Clade: †Artiopoda
- Class: †Trilobita
- Order: †Proetida
- Family: †Phillipsiidae
- Subfamily: †Thaiaspidinae
- Genus: †Thaiaspis; Kobayashi, 1961

Species
- Thaiaspis aliger Kobayashi & Hamada, 1978; Thaiaspis euryrachis Kobayashi & Hamada, 1979; Thaiaspis sethaputi Koizumi, 1972

= Thaiaspis =

Thaiaspis Temporal range: Middle to Late Mississippian

Genus of proetid trilobite belonging to the family Phillipsiidae

Thaiaspis is a genus of proetid trilobite belonging to the family Phillipsiidae. Fossils of the various species are found in Middle to Late Mississippian-aged marine strata of eastern Asia, especially of Carboniferous-aged marine strata in Thailand.
