= Paraperrinitinae =

Scientific classification
- Kingdom: Animalia
- Phylum: Mollusca
- Class: Cephalopoda
- Subclass: †Ammonoidea
- Order: †Goniatitida
- Family: †Perrinitidae
- Subfamily: †Paraperrinitinae; Tharalson, 1984

Genera
- Mapirites; Metaperrinites; Nepirrites; Paraperrinites; Perrimetanites; Properrinites; Ripernites; Shyndoceras

Extinct subfamily of molluscs

Paraperrinitinae is one of two subfamilies of the Perrinitidae family. They are an extinct group of ammonoid, which are shelled cephalopods related to squids, belemnites, octopuses, and cuttlefish, and more distantly to the nautiloids.
