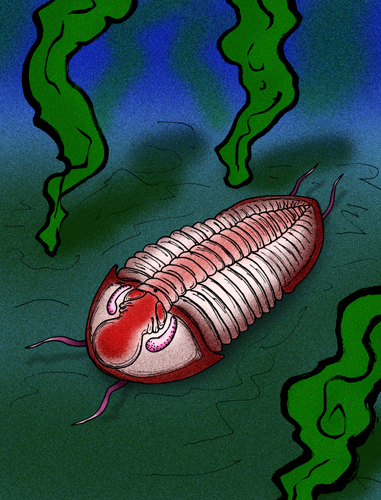
- Nipponaspis

Scientific classification
- Kingdom: Animalia
- Phylum: Arthropoda
- Clade: †Artiopoda
- Class: †Trilobita
- Order: †Proetida
- Superfamily: †Proetoidea
- Family: †Phillipsiidae; Oehlert, 1886

= Phillipsiidae =

Phillipsiidae Temporal range: Lower Mississippian–Late Permian

Family of trilobites (fossil)

Phillipsiidae is a family of proetid trilobites, the various genera of which comprise some of the last of the trilobites, with a range that extended from the Kinderhookian epoch of the Lower Mississippian, to the end of Changhsingian age at Permian-Triassic extinction event in the latest Permian period.

Phillipsiidae is sometimes defined as a subfamily, "Phillipsiinae," and usually placed within the family Proetidae. Jell & Adrain (2003) went so far as to lump Phillipsiidae into the family Proetidae, however other workers since like Lerosey-Aubril and Feist (2005) have continued to recognize Phillipsiidae as a distinct and separate family within Proetida.

== Subfamilies ==
The following genera are included, divided among six subfamilies:

- No subfamily
  - Phillipsia (type genus)
  - Breviphillipsia
  - Comptonaspis
  - Griffithidella
  - Hesslerides
  - Kollarcephalus
  - Nunnaspis
  - Phillibole
  - Piltonia
- Subfamily Archegoninae
  - Archegonus
  - Hildaphillipsia
- Subfamily Bollandiinae
  - Bollandia
  - Kathwaia
  - Neoproetus
- Subfamily Cummingellinae
  - Bedicella
  - Cummingella
  - Paraphillipsia
  - Persiax
- Subfamily Cyrtosymbolinae
  - Carbonocoryphe
  - Cyrtosymbole
- Subfamily Ditomopyginae
  - Acanthophillipsia
  - Acropyge
  - Ameropiltonia
  - Ameura
  - Ampulliglabella
  - Australokaskia
  - Anisopyge
  - Delaria
  - Ditomopyge
  - Hentigia
  - Iranaspidion
  - Jimbokranion
  - Malchi
  - Microphillipsia
  - Novoameura
  - Planokaskia
  - Permoproetus
  - Pseudophillipsia
  - Simulopaladin
  - Timoraspis
  - Triproetus
  - Vidria
- Subfamily Thaiaspidinae
  - Thaiaspis
  - Thigriffides
- Subfamily Weaniinae
  - Doublatia
  - Endops
  - Nipponaspis
  - Weania
