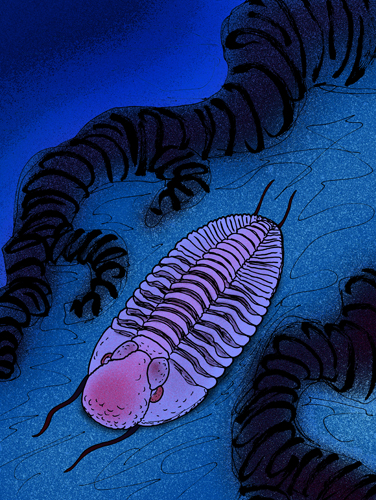
- Artist's reconstruction of Kathwaia capitorosa

Scientific classification
- Kingdom: Animalia
- Phylum: Arthropoda
- Clade: †Artiopoda
- Class: †Trilobita
- Order: †Proetida
- Family: †Phillipsiidae
- Genus: †Kathwaia; Grant, 1966

= Kathwaia =

Kathwaia Temporal range: Middle Permian–Late permian

Genus of late trilobite

Kathwaia is a genus of trilobite known from the late Permian of Pakistan. It is notable for being one of the five last-known trilobites.

== Taxonomy ==
The genus is in the family Phillipsiidae, just like all the last trilobites (except for what is doubtfully Cheiropyge). The genus' type species, K. capitorosa, is now considered a junior synonym of K. caucasica.

=== Species ===
Some of the know species:

- Kathwaia caucasica
- Kathwaia girtyi
