= Shumarditoidea =

Scientific classification
- Domain: Eukaryota
- Kingdom: Animalia
- Phylum: Mollusca
- Class: Cephalopoda
- Subclass: †Ammonoidea
- Order: †Goniatitida
- Suborder: †Goniatitina
- Superfamily: †Shumarditoidea; Plummer & Scott 1937

Families
- Parashumarditidae; Perrinitidae; Shumarditidae

Synonyms
- Shumarditaceae

Extinct superfamily of molluscs

Shumarditoidea is one of seventeen superfamilies of the Goniatitina suborder. They are an extinct group of ammonoid, which are shelled cephalopods related to squids, belemnites, octopuses, and cuttlefish, and more distantly to the nautiloids.
