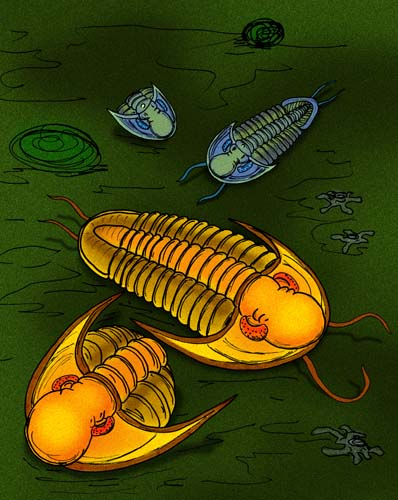
- Reconstructions of Malchi magnificus and Planokaskia

Scientific classification
- Kingdom: Animalia
- Phylum: Arthropoda
- Clade: †Artiopoda
- Class: †Trilobita
- Order: †Proetida
- Family: †Phillipsiidae
- Subfamily: †Ditomopyginae
- Genus: †Malchi; Engel & Morris 1994
- Species: †M. magnificus

Binomial name
- †Malchi magnificus Engel & Morris 1994

= Malchi =

Malchi Temporal range: Late Tournaisian

Genus of trilobites

Malchi magnificus is a proetid trilobite belonging to the family Phillipsiidae. The exquisitely preserved fossils are found in Lower Carboniferous-aged marine strata of what is now Malchi Creek, Queensland, Australia.
