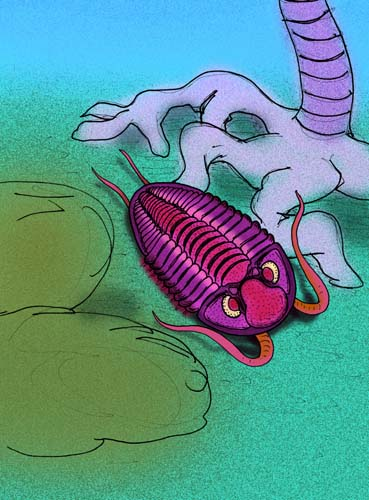
- Reconstruction of T. bonbon

Scientific classification
- Kingdom: Animalia
- Phylum: Arthropoda
- Clade: †Artiopoda
- Class: †Trilobita
- Order: †Proetida
- Family: †Phillipsiidae
- Subfamily: †Ditomopyginae
- Genus: †Triproetus; Steininger, 1831

Type species
- Neoproetus Triproetus subovalis Kobayashi and Hamada, 1979

Species
- T. altasulcus Brezinski, 1992; T. angustus Brezinski, 1992; T. bonbon Fortey and Heward, 2015; T. borealis; ?T. spitsbergensis(Osmólska 1968); T. subovalis (Kobayashi and Hamada, 1979) type species* (McCoy, 1846); T. tumidus Brezinski, 1992

= Triproetus =

Triproetus Temporal range: Late Carboniferous–Lopingian

Genus of trilobites

Triproetus is a genus of proetid trilobite found in Upper Carboniferous-aged marine strata in Russia, and Lower Permian-aged strata of Thailand, Malaysia, Spitzbergen, Yukon Territory, the Middle Permian-aged marine strata of Oman and Texas, and the Late Permian of New Zealand and Spitzbergen.
