= Perrinitidae =

Scientific classification
- Kingdom: Animalia
- Phylum: Mollusca
- Class: Cephalopoda
- Subclass: †Ammonoidea
- Order: †Goniatitida
- Superfamily: †Shumarditoidea
- Family: †Perrinitidae; Miller & Furnish 1940

Subfamilies
- Paraperrinitinae; Perrinitinae

Extinct family of molluscs

Perrinitidae is one of three families of the Shumarditoidea superfamily. They are an extinct group of ammonoid, which are shelled cephalopods related to squids, belemnites, octopuses, and cuttlefish, and more distantly to the nautiloids.
