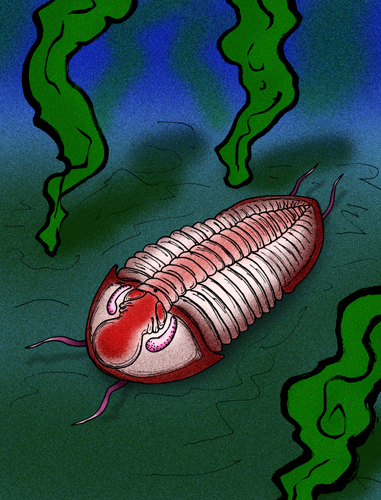
- Nipponaspis takaizumii

Scientific classification
- Kingdom: Animalia
- Phylum: Arthropoda
- Clade: †Artiopoda
- Class: †Trilobita
- Order: †Proetida
- Family: †Phillipsiidae
- Subfamily: †Weaniinae
- Genus: †Nipponaspis; Koizumi, 1972

Type species
- Nipponaspis takaizumii Koizumi, 1972

= Nipponaspis =

Nipponaspis Temporal range: Middle Permian

Genus of trilobites

Nipponaspis is a genus of proetid trilobite belonging to the family Phillipsiidae. Fossils of the various species are found in Middle Permian-aged marine strata of Fukushima Prefecture, Japan, China, Korea, and Alaska.
