= Parashumarditidae =

Scientific classification
- Kingdom: Animalia
- Phylum: Mollusca
- Class: Cephalopoda
- Subclass: †Ammonoidea
- Order: †Goniatitida
- Superfamily: †Shumarditoidea
- Family: †Parashumarditidae; Boardman et al. 1994

Genera
- Aktubites; Eoshumardites; Eovidrioceras; Hypershumardites; Parashumardites

Extinct family of molluscs

Parashumarditidae is one of three families of the Shumarditoidea superfamily. They are an extinct group of ammonoid, which are shelled cephalopods related to squids, belemnites, octopuses, and cuttlefish, and more distantly to the nautiloids.
