= Shumarditidae =

Scientific classification
- Kingdom: Animalia
- Phylum: Mollusca
- Class: Cephalopoda
- Subclass: †Ammonoidea
- Order: †Goniatitida
- Superfamily: †Shumarditoidea
- Family: †Shumarditidae; Plummer & Scott 1937

Genera
- Postaktubites; Preshumardites; Pseudaktubites; Shumardites

Extinct family of molluscs

Shumarditidae is one of three families of the Shumarditoidea superfamily. They are an extinct group of ammonoid, which are shelled cephalopods related to squids, belemnites, octopuses, and cuttlefish, and more distantly to the nautiloids.
