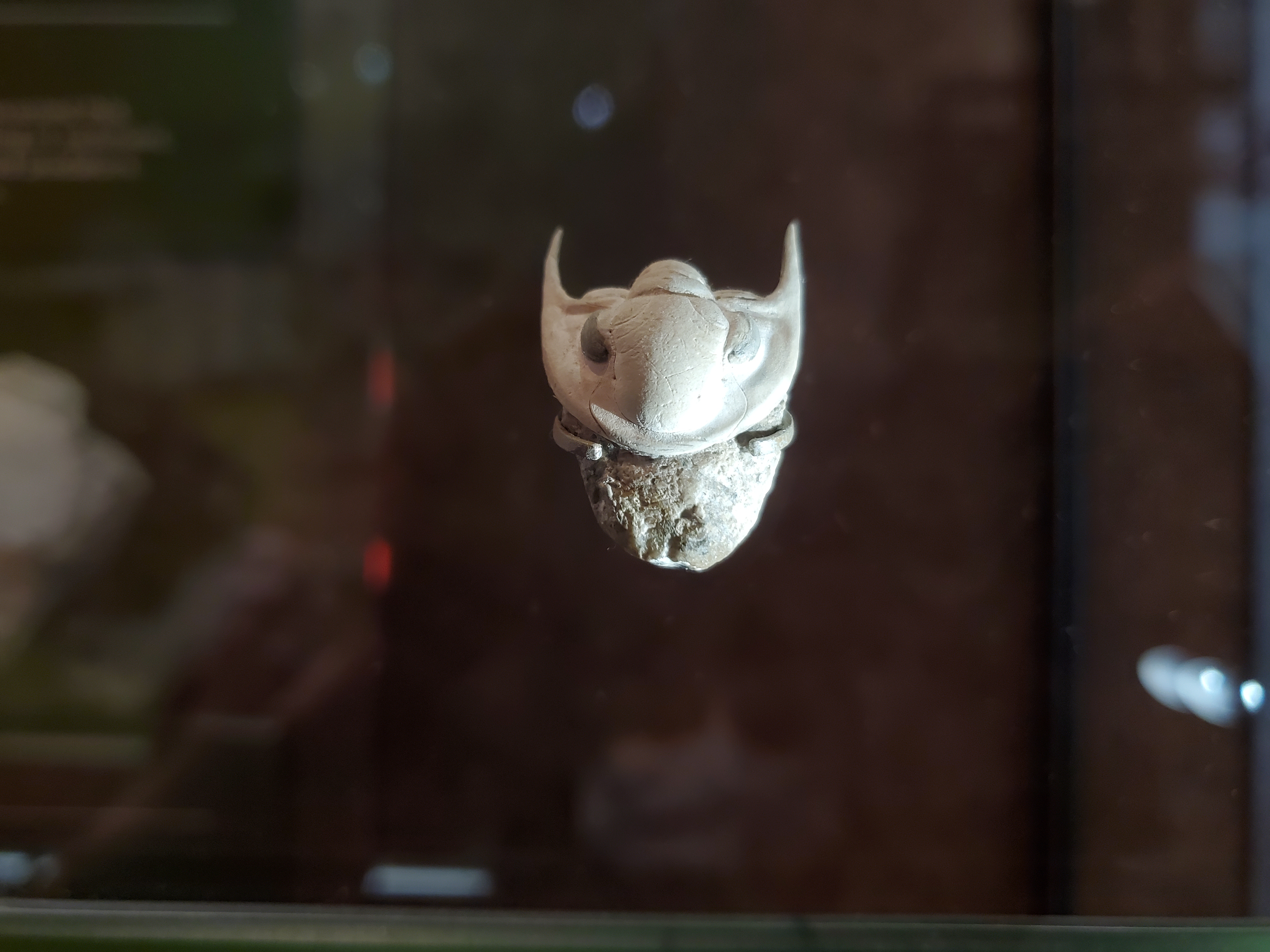

Scientific classification
- Kingdom: Animalia
- Phylum: Arthropoda
- Clade: †Artiopoda
- Class: †Trilobita
- Order: †Proetida
- Family: †Phillipsiidae
- Subfamily: †Ditomopyginae
- Genus: †Ameura; Weller, 1936

Species
- A. missouriensis Shumard, 1858; A. trigonopyge Osmólska, 1968

= Ameura =

Ameura Temporal range: Pennsylvanian-early Permian ~318–295 Ma

Extinct genus of trilobite

Ameura is an extinct genus of trilobite belonging to the family Proetidae. Fossils from the genus have been found in late Paleozoic beds in North America.
