= Wilkingia =

Wilkingia Temporal range: Visean-Changhsingian ~336–253 Ma

Scientific classification
- Kingdom: Animalia
- Phylum: Mollusca
- Class: Bivalvia
- Family: †Sanguinolitidae
- Genus: †Wilkingia; Wilson, 1959

Extinct genus of bivalves

Wilkingia is an extinct genus of fossil bivalve molluscs that lived from the Early Carboniferous (Visean) to the Late Permian (Changhsingian) in Asia, Europe, North and South America (Río del Peñón Formation of Argentina, Piauí Formation of Brazil and Cerro El Arbol Formation of Chile).
