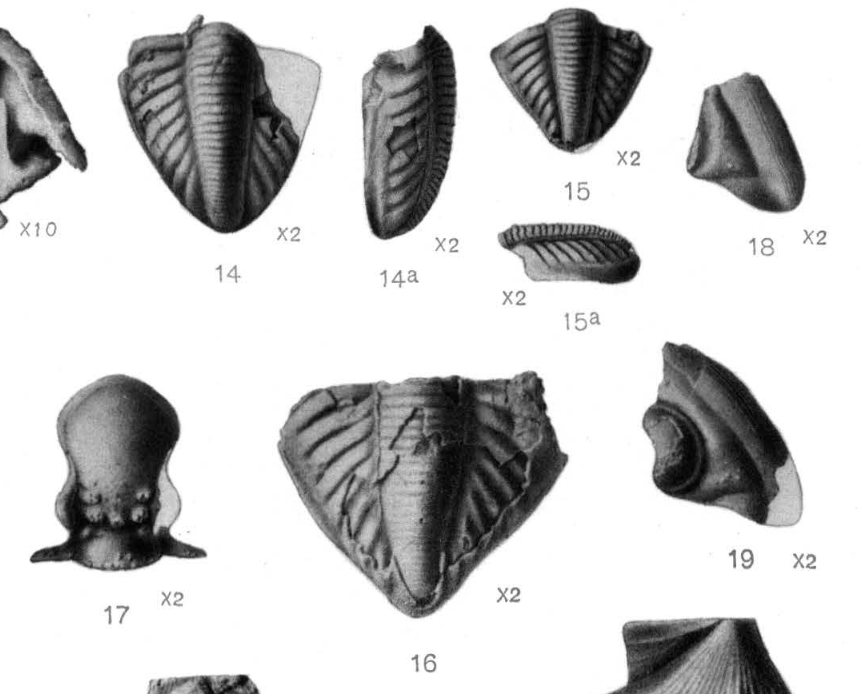
- A. perannulata fossil fragments

Scientific classification
- Domain: Eukaryota
- Kingdom: Animalia
- Phylum: Arthropoda
- Class: †Trilobita
- Order: †Proetida
- Family: †Phillipsiidae
- Subfamily: †Ditomopyginae
- Genus: †Anisopyge; Girty, 1909

= Anisopyge =

Anisopyge Temporal range: Kungurian-Capitanian279–259 Ma

Extinct genus of trilobite

Anisopyge is an extinct genus of trilobite belonging to the order Proetida and family Phillipsiidae. Specimens have been found in Permian beds in North and Central America.

The genus was among the last surviving trilobite groups. It may have evolved from Sevillea, diversifying to fill empty ecological niches.

== Species ==
- A. cooperi Brezinski 1992
- A. hyperbola Chamberlain 1972
- A. inornata Girty 1909
- A. perannulata Shumard 1858
