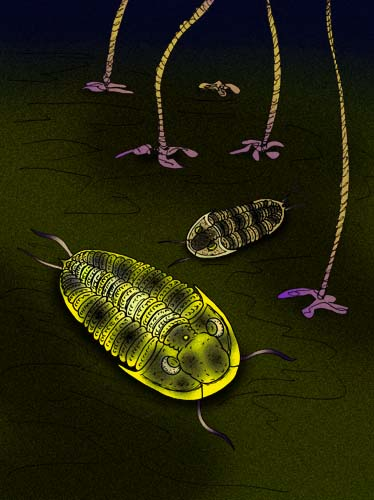
- Reconstruction of adult and juvenile

Scientific classification
- Kingdom: Animalia
- Phylum: Arthropoda
- Clade: †Artiopoda
- Class: †Trilobita
- Order: †Proetida
- Family: †Phillipsiidae
- Subfamily: †Ditomopyginae
- Genus: †Vidria; Weller, 1944

= Vidria =

Vidria Temporal range: Guadalupian

Genus of trilobites

Vidria is a genus of proetid trilobites belonging to the family Phillipsiidae. Vidria vespa fossils are found in Middle Permian-aged marine strata of Western Texas. It is unique among Permian-aged trilobites in having a posterior spine emanating from the pygidium of the adult (two such posterior spines are present in immature individuals).
