= List of the Paleozoic life of Montana =

This list of the Paleozoic life of Montana contains the various prehistoric life-forms whose fossilized remains have been reported from within the US state of Montana and are between 538.8 and 252.17 million years of age.

== A ==
- †Acanthocrania
  - †Acanthocrania spinosa – type locality for species
- †Acanthograptus
- †Acanthopecten
  - †Acanthopecten coloradoensis
- †Achistrum
  - †Achistrum coloculum
  - †Achistrum gamma
  - †Achistrum monochordata
- †Acrothele
  - †Acrothele colleni – type locality for species
  - †Acrothele pentagonensis
- †Acrotreta
  - †Acrotreta attica – or unidentified comparable form
- †Actinopteria
  - †Actinopteria subdecussata – or unidentified comparable form
- †Adetognathus
  - †Adetognathus gigantus
  - †Adetognathus lautus
  - †Adetognathus spathus
- †Aenigmacaris – type locality for genus
  - †Aenigmacaris cornigerum – type locality for species

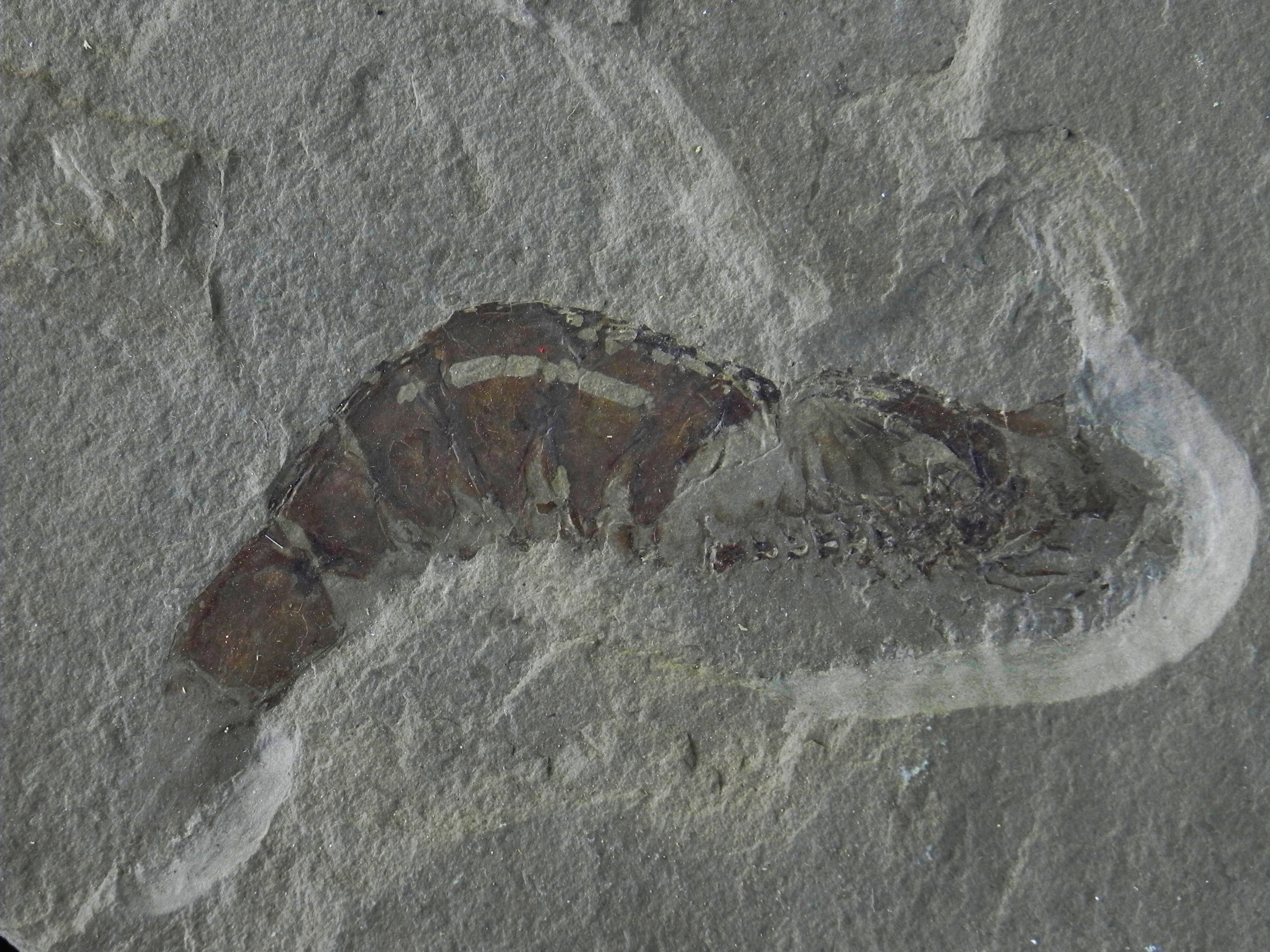
†Aenigmacaris cornigerum SCHRAM & HORNER 1979 from the Mississippian of Bear Gulch

- †Aesopichthys – type locality for genus
  - †Aesopichthys erinaceus – type locality for species
- †Albertella – type locality for genus
  - †Albertella hellena – type locality for species
- †Allanaria
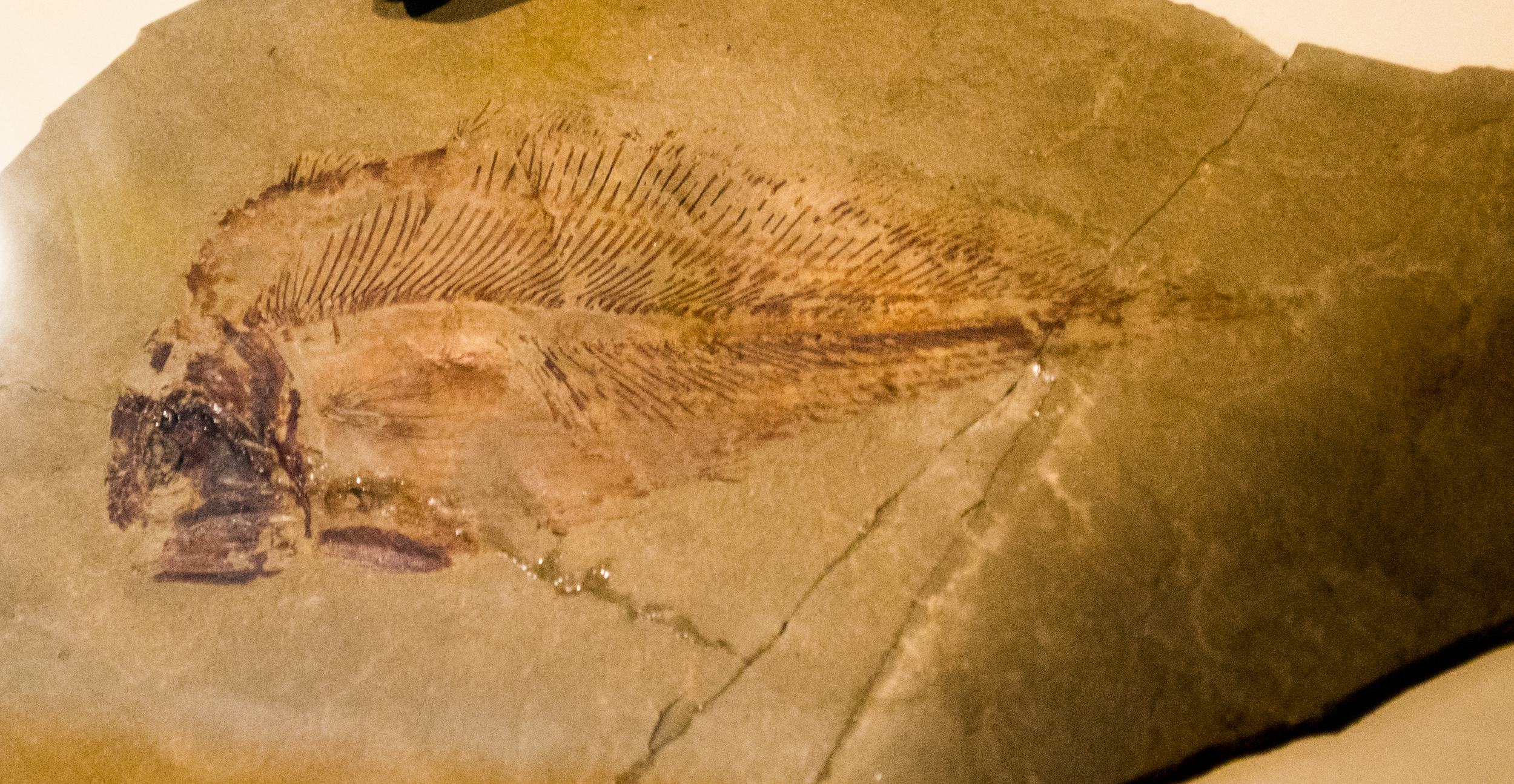
- Fossilized skeleton of the Carboniferous lobe-finned fish Allenypterus
  †Allenypterus – type locality for genus
  - †Allenypterus montanus – type locality for species
- †Allorisma
- †Ambocoelia
  - †Ambocoelia gregaria
- †Ambothyris
- †Ameura – tentative report
- Ammodiscus
- †Amphiscapha
- †Amplexizaphrentis
  - †Amplexizaphrentis spinulosus – or unidentified comparable form
- †Amplexus
- †Angulotreta
- †Angyomphalus – tentative report
  - †Angyomphalus excavatus – type locality for species
- †Anisotrypa
- †Ankhelasma
- †Annuliconcha
- †Anoria
- †Anthracospirifer
  - †Anthracospirifer curvilateralis – type locality for species
  - †Anthracospirifer occidus
  - †Anthracospirifer shoshonensis
  - †Anthracospirifer welleri
- †Antiquatonia
  - †Antiquatonia coloradoensis
  - †Antiquatonia pernodosa – type locality for species
- †Apatokephalus
  - †Apatokephalus canadensis – or unidentified comparable form
- †Aphelaeceras
- †Aphelaspis
- †Apheoorthis
  - †Apheoorthis ocha
- †Aporthophyla
- †Apotocardium
  - †Apotocardium latifasciatum
- †Arceodomus
  - †Arceodomus glabrata – type locality for species
- †Archisymplectes
  - †Archisymplectes rhothon
- †Arctospirifer
  - †Arctospirifer allegheniensis – or unidentified comparable form
- †Asaphellus
- †Astartella
- †Astreptoscolex
  - †Astreptoscolex anasillosus
- †Athyris
- †Atrypa
- †Aulacoparia
  - †Aulacoparia impressa – type locality for species
  - †Aulacoparia wibauxensis
- †Aulopora
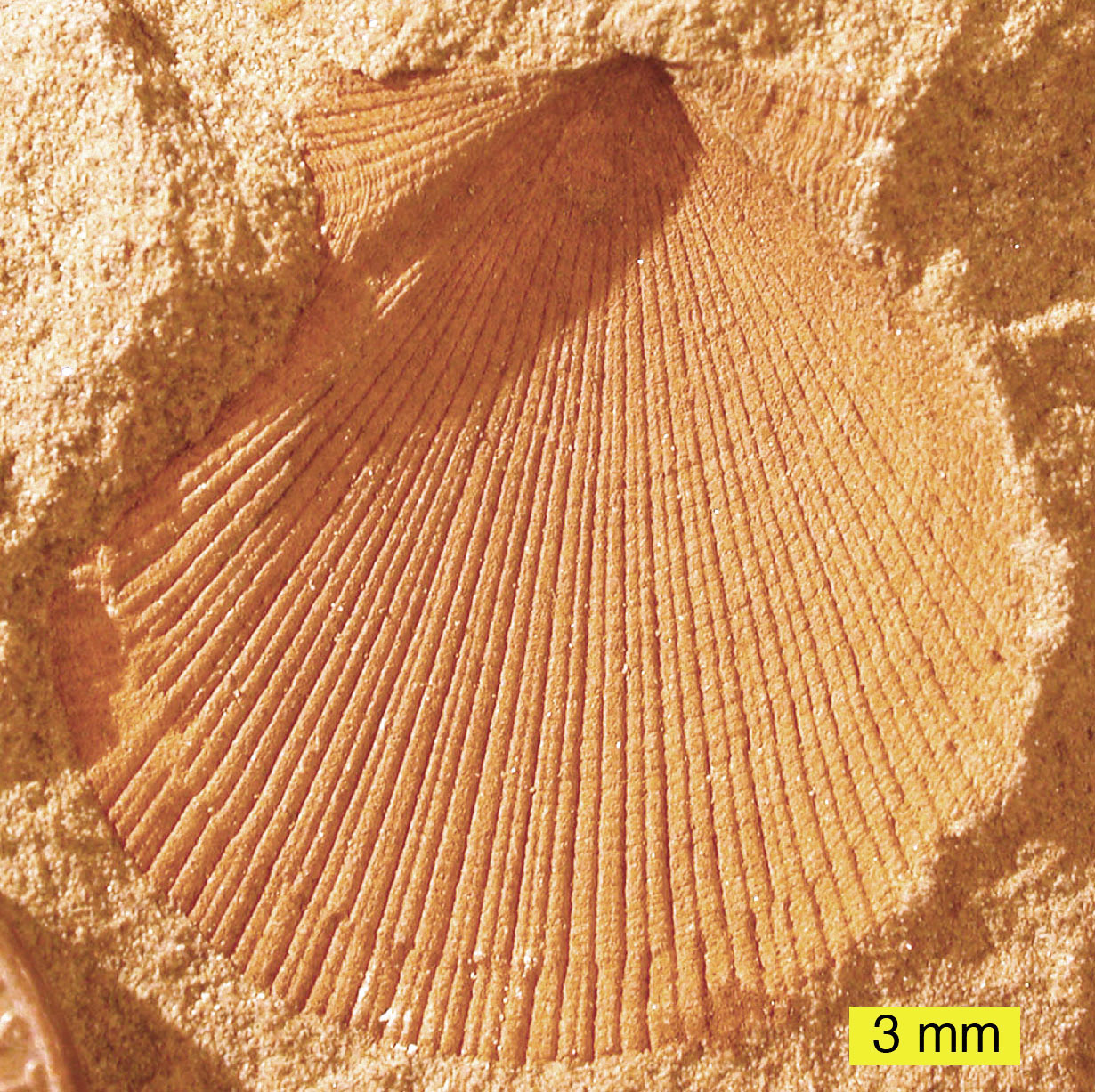
- Mold fossil of a shell of the Early Devonian-Late Triassic bivalve Aviculopecten
  †Aviculopecten
  - †Aviculopecten kaibabensis – or unidentified comparable form
- †Aviculopinna
- †Avonia
  - †Avonia arcuata – tentative report
- †Axiodeaneia

== B ==
- †Babylonites
- †Bactrites
  - †Bactrites nitidus
- Bairdia
- †Barytichisma
  - †Barytichisma amsdenense
- †Basilicorhynchus
  - †Basilicorhynchus ventricosum
- †Bathyuriscus
  - †Bathyuriscus formosus – or unidentified comparable form
- †Beagiascus – type locality for genus
  - †Beagiascus pulcherrimus – type locality for species
- †Beecheria
  - †Beecheria paraplicata – type locality for species
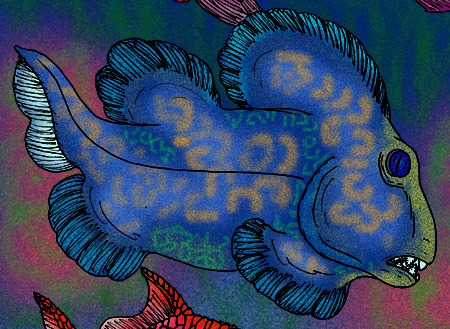
- Restoration of the Carboniferous Chimaera relative Belantsea
  †Belantsea – type locality for genus
  - †Belantsea montana – type locality for species
- †Bellefontia
- †Bellerophon
  - †Bellerophon deflectus
- †Bifungites
  - †Bifungites bisagitta
- †Billingsella
- †Blountia
- †Bolaspis
- †Brachythyris
- †Bradyphyllum
  - †Bradyphyllum clavigerum – type locality for species
- †Bryantodus
  - †Bryantodus crassidens
  - †Bryantodus scitulus
- †Bryograptus
- †Bucanella
- †Bulimorpha
  - †Bulimorpha elegans
- †Burnetiella
- †Buxtonia
  - †Buxtonia arizonensis
- †Bynumiella – tentative report
- †Bynumina

== C ==
- †Cactocrinus – tentative report
- †Caenanoplia – tentative report
  - †Caenanoplia logani – or unidentified related form
- †Callograptus
- †Camaraspis
- †Camarophorella
  - †Camarophorella buckleyi – or unidentified comparable form
- †Camarotoechia
  - †Camarotoechia C. chouteauensis – or unidentified comparable form
  - †Camarotoechia C. inaequa Shaw – or unidentified comparable form
  - †Camarotoechia contracta
  - †Camarotoechia crenistria
  - †Camarotoechia elegantula
  - †Camarotoechia herrickana – or unidentified related form
  - †Camarotoechia metallica
  - †Camarotoechia mettalica – or unidentified comparable form
  - †Camarotoechia mutata
  - †Camarotoechia tuta
- †Canadiphyllum
- †Caninia
  - †Caninia montanensis – type locality for species
- †Carbosesostris – type locality for genus
  - †Carbosesostris megaliphagon – type locality for species
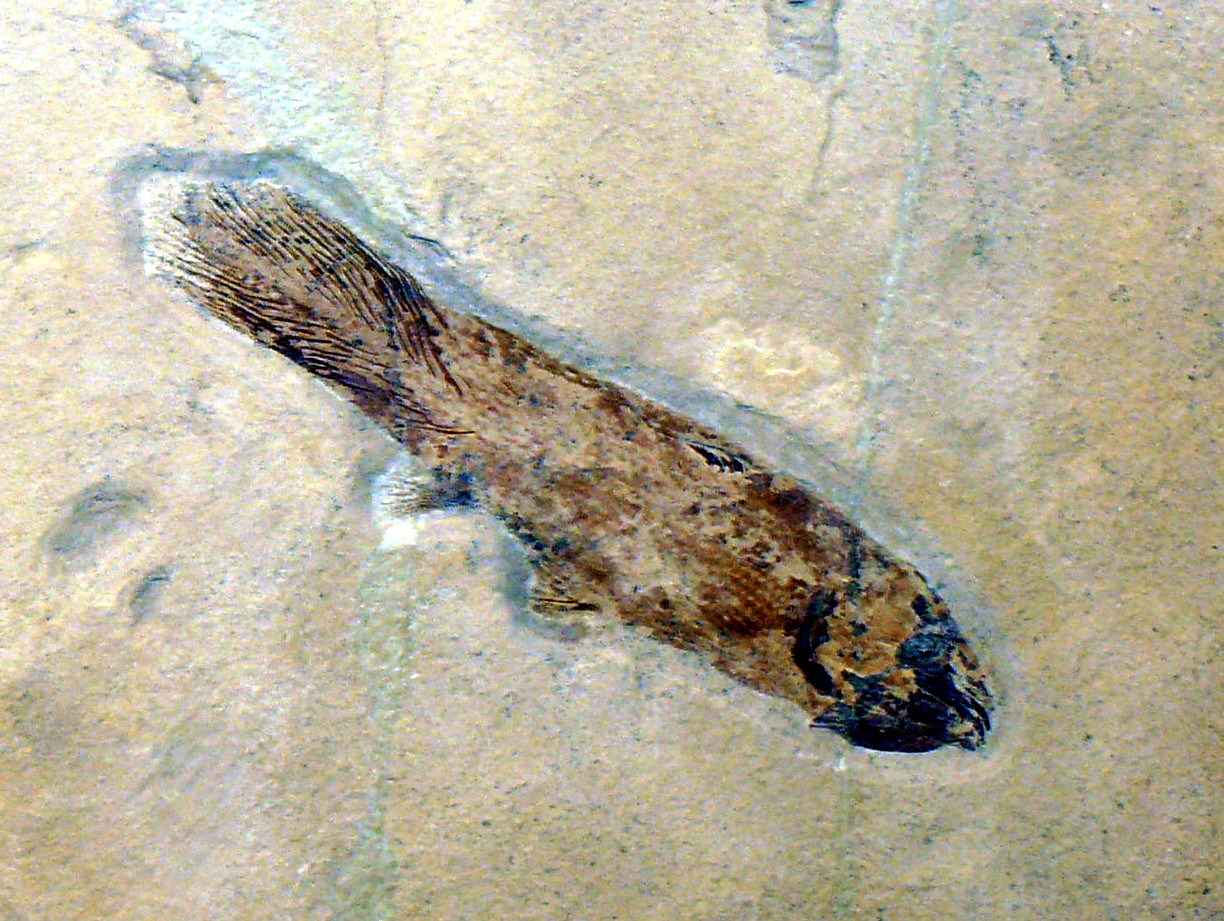
- Fossilized skeleton of the Carboniferous coelacanth Caridosuctor
  †Caridosuctor – type locality for genus
  - †Caridosuctor populosum – type locality for species
- †Carinoclymenia
- †Cavusgnathus
  - †Cavusgnathus alta
  - †Cavusgnathus naviculus
- †Ceratopea
  - †Ceratopea sinclairensis
- †Ceratreta
- †Cheilocephalus
  - †Cheilocephalus brevilobus
- †Cheiloceras
  - †Cheiloceras simplex
- †Chilotrypa – tentative report
- †Chonetes
  - †Chonetes geniculatus
  - †Chonetes loganensis
  - †Chonetes logani
  - †Chonetes ornatus
- Fossilized tooth of the shark Cladodus
  †Cladodus
- †Clavallus
  - †Clavallus spicaudina
- †Cleiothyridina
  - †Cleiothyridina atrypoides
  - †Cleiothyridina ciriacksi – type locality for species
  - †Cleiothyridina coloradoensis – or unidentified comparable form
  - †Cleiothyridina devonica
  - †Cleiothyridina hirsuta
  - †Cleiothyridina incrassata – or unidentified related form
  - †Cleiothyridina sublamellosa
- †Cleiothyridnia
  - †Cleiothyridnia sublamellosa
- †Cleistopora
  - †Cleistopora placenta
- †Clelandia
- †Cliffia
- †Clionolithes
- †Clonograptus
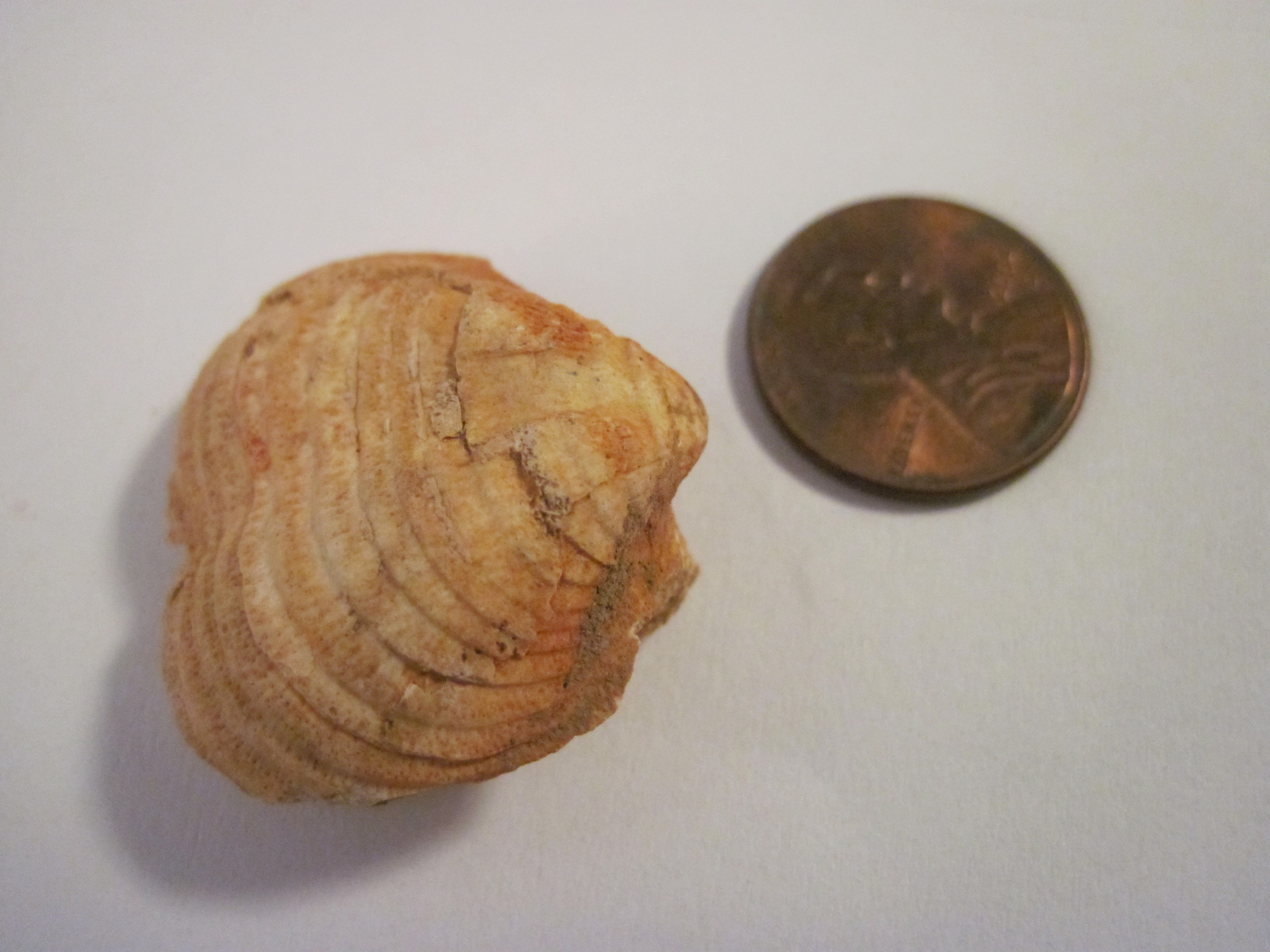
- Fossilized shell of the Late Devonian-Permian brachiopod Composita
  †Composita
  - †Composita humilis
  - †Composita laevis
  - †Composita lateralis – or unidentified comparable form
  - †Composita madisonensis
  - †Composita ovata
  - †Composita ozarkana
  - †Composita sulcata
- †Conularia
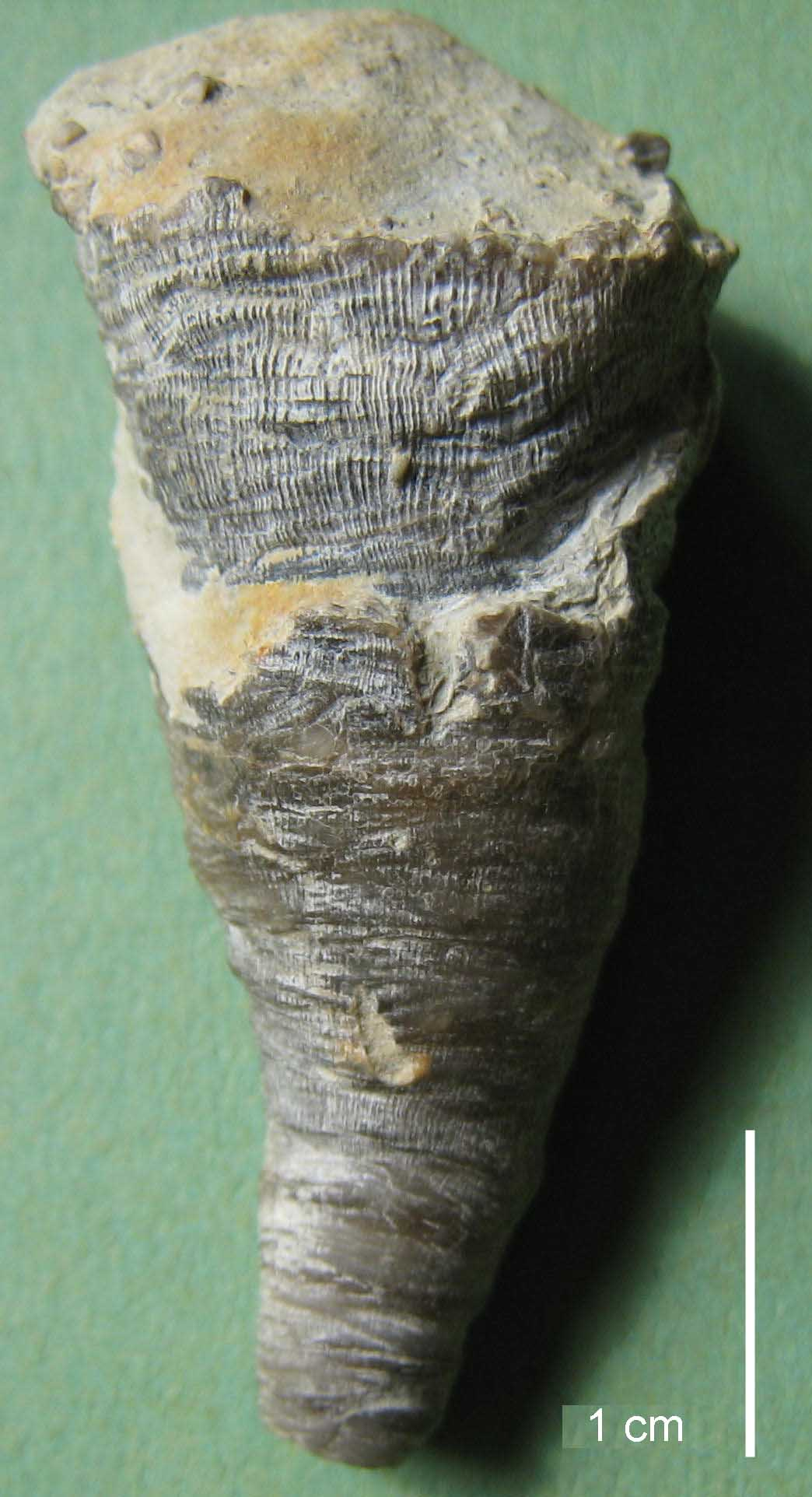
- Fossil of the Middle Ordovician-Carboniferous horn coral Cornulites
  †Cornulites
  - †Cornulites carbonarius
- †Costatoblastus – type locality for genus
  - †Costatoblastus sappingtonensis – type locality for species
- †Cranaena – tentative report
  - †Cranaena circularis – type locality for species
- †Crania
  - †Crania blairi – or unidentified comparable form
  - †Crania rowleyi
- †Croixana
- †Crurithyris
  - †Crurithyris minuta
  - †Crurithyris parva – or unidentified comparable form
- †Cryptonella – tentative report
  - †Cryptonella pinyonensis – or unidentified comparable form
- †Crytina
  - †Crytina acutirostris
- †Culmicrinus
  - †Culmicrinus jeffersonensis – or unidentified comparable form
- †Cupularostrum
  - †Cupularostrum contracta
- †Cyathaxonia
- †Cypricardella
- †Cyranorhis – type locality for genus
  - †Cyranorhis bergeraci – type locality for species
- †Cyrtina
  - †Cyrtina acutirostris – or unidentified comparable form
- †Cyrtiopsis – tentative report
- †Cyrtodiscus
- †Cyrtorostra
  - †Cyrtorostra varicostata
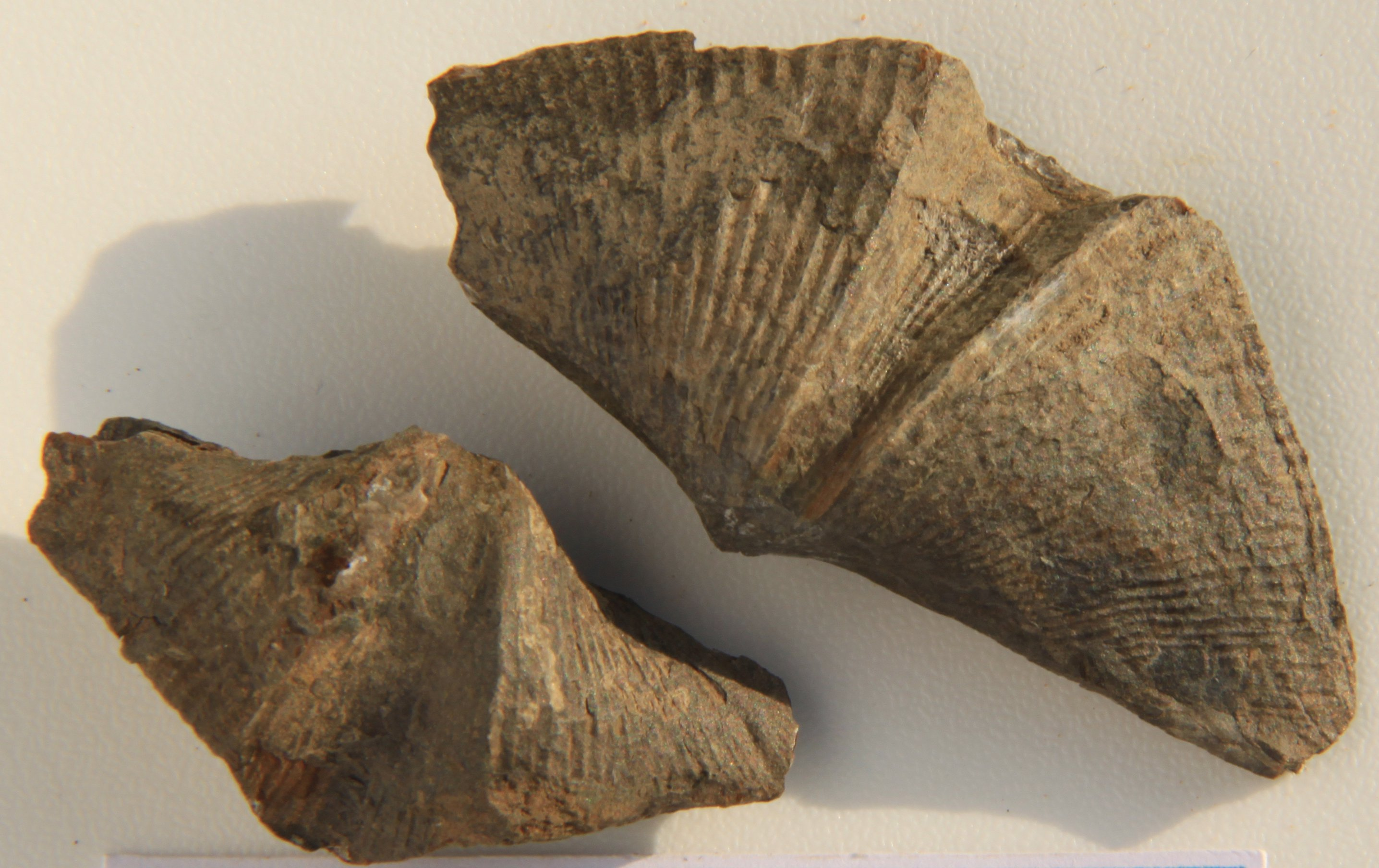
- Fossilized shells of the Middle-Late Devonian brachiopod Cyrtospirifer
  †Cyrtospirifer
  - †Cyrtospirifer animaensis
  - †Cyrtospirifer animasensis – or unidentified comparable form
  - †Cyrtospirifer bertrandi – type locality for species
  - †Cyrtospirifer gallatinensis
  - †Cyrtospirifer hornellensis
  - †Cyrtospirifer monticola
  - †Cyrtospirifer perryi – type locality for species
  - †Cyrtospirifer thalattodoxa – tentative report
  - †Cyrtospirifer whitneyi
- †Cystodictya

== D ==
- †Damocles – type locality for genus
  - †Damocles serratus – type locality for species
- †Deadwoodia
- †Debeerius – type locality for genus
  - †Debeerius ellefseni – type locality for species
- †Dellea
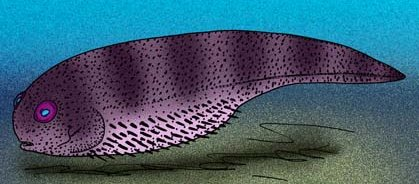
- Life restoration of the Carboniferous Chimaera relative Delphyodontos
  †Delphyodontos – type locality for genus
  - †Delphyodontos dacriformes – type locality for species
- †Delthyris – tentative report
- †Dendrograptus
- †Dentinella
- †Derbyia
- †Deuteronectanebos – type locality for genus
  - †Deuteronectanebos papillorum – type locality for species
- †Diaphelasma
- †Diaphragmus
  - †Diaphragmus fasciculatus
- †Dicellomus
  - †Dicellomus occidentalis
- †Dictyclostus
  - †Dictyclostus richardsi
- †Dictyoclostus
  - †Dictyoclostus ferglenensis – or unidentified comparable form
  - †Dictyoclostus gallatinensis
  - †Dictyoclostus inflatus
  - †Dictyoclostus richardsi
- †Dictyoclosyus
  - †Dictyoclosyus inflatus
- †Dictyonema
- †Dielasma
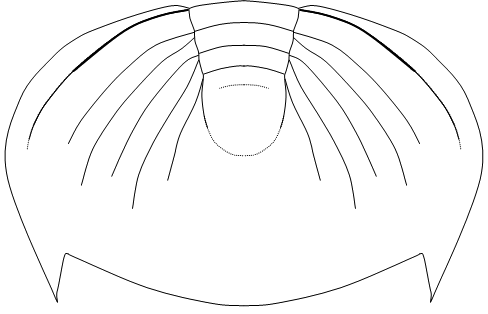
- Illustration of the fossilized pygidium (tail segment) of the Cambrian trilobite Dikelocephalus
  †Dikelocephalus
- †Dimegelasma
- †Dinotocrinus
- †Discoserra – type locality for genus
  - †Discoserra pectinodon – type locality for species

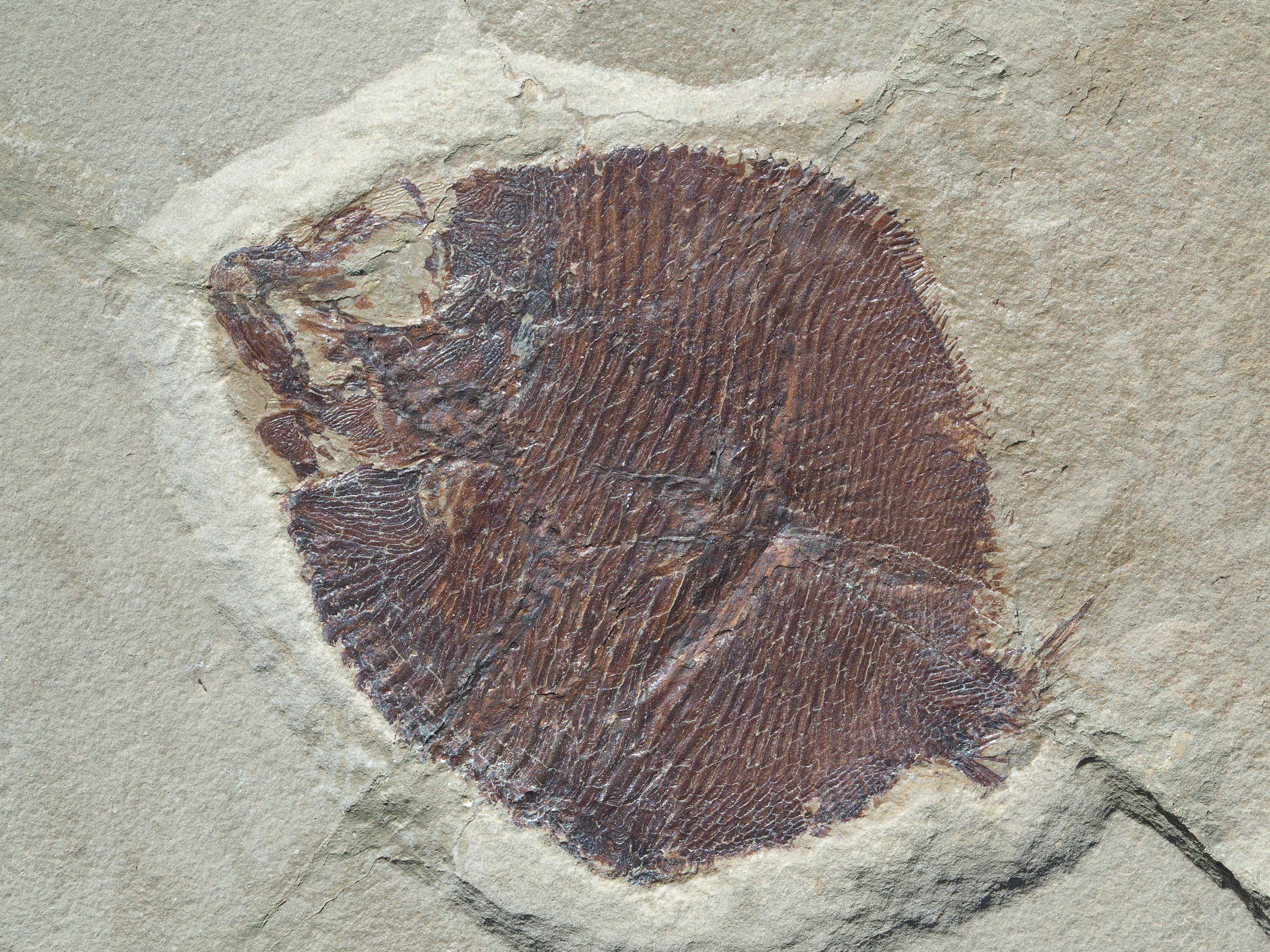
†Discoserra pectinodon Lund 2000 from the Mississippian of Bear Gulch

- †Distomodus
- †Dithyrocaris
  - †Dithyrocaris rolfei – type locality for species

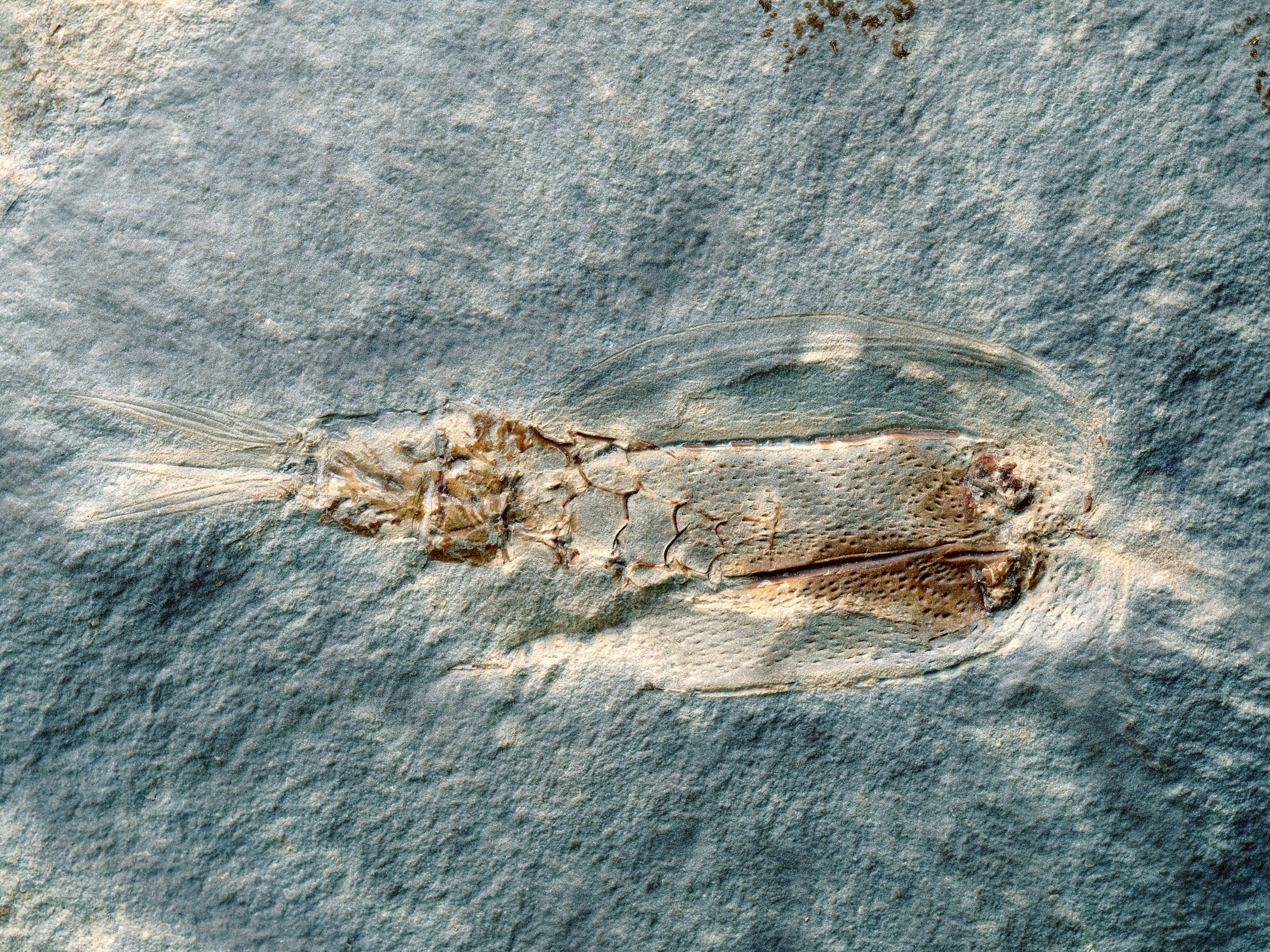
†Dithyrocaris rolfei Schram and Horner 1978 from the Mississippian of Bear Gulch

- †Ditodus
- †Drepanodus
  - †Drepanodus subarcuatus
- †Drumaspis
- †Dysoristus

== E ==
- †Echinaria
- †Echinauris – or unidentified related form
- †Echinochimaera – type locality for genus
  - †Echinochimaera meltoni – type locality for species

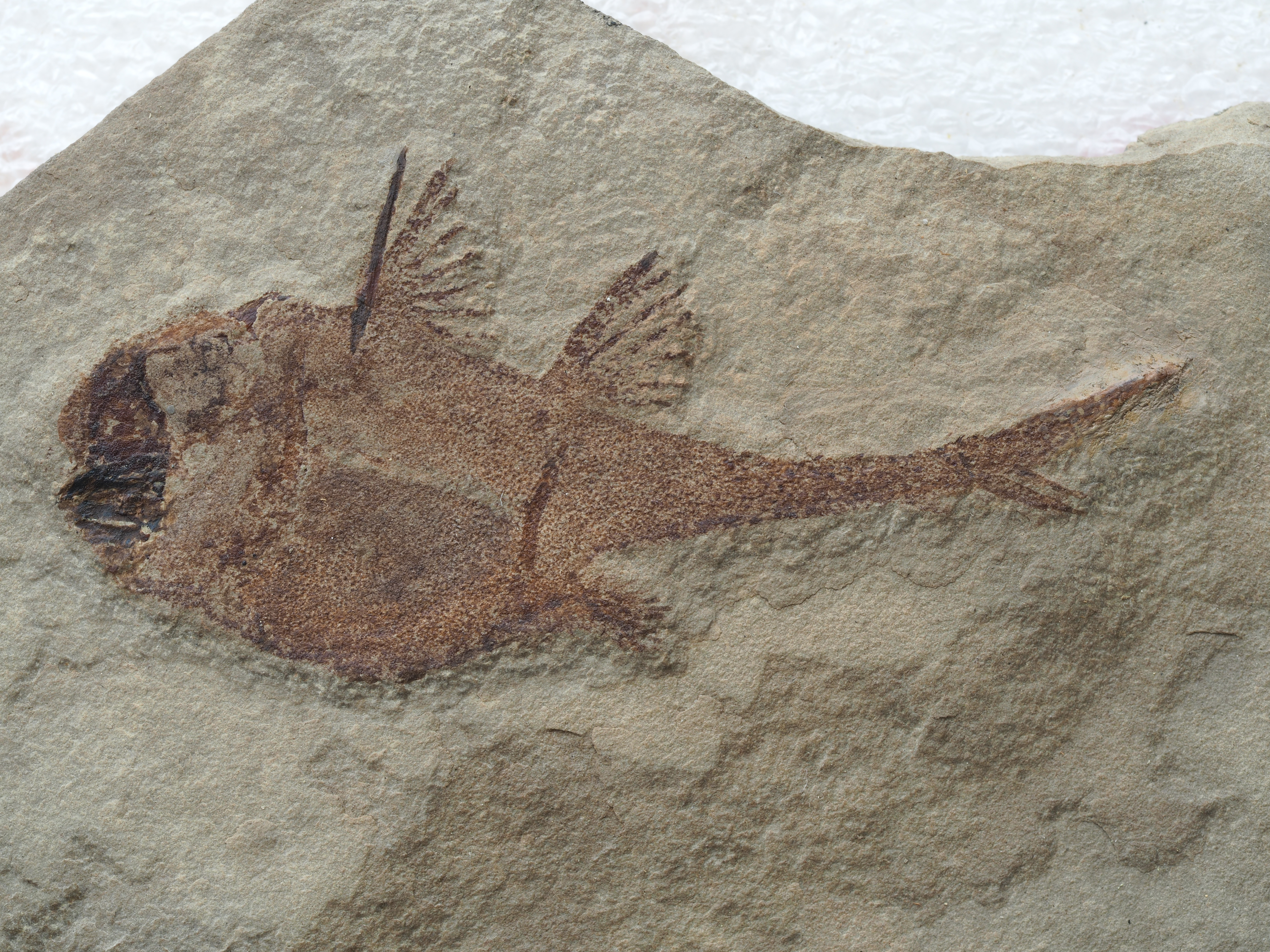
†Echinochimaera meltoni Lund 1977 from the Mississippian of Bear Gulch

  - †Echinochimaera snyderi – type locality for species
- †Echinocoelia
  - †Echinocoelia youngstownensis
- †Echinoconchus
  - †Echinoconchus alternatus – or unidentified related form
  - †Echinoconchus angustus – type locality for species
- †Echinocrinus
- †Edmondia
  - †Edmondia E. marionensis – or unidentified comparable form
  - †Edmondia stuchburia
- †Ehmania – tentative report
- †Eleutherokomma
  - †Eleutherokomma raymondi
- †Elrathiella – or unidentified comparable form
- †Elrathina
- †Elvinia
  - †Elvinia roemeria
- †Emanuella
- †Enygmophyllum
- Eocaudina
  - †Eocaudina columcanthus
  - †Eocaudina marginata
  - †Eocaudina subhexagona
- †Eolissochonetes
  - †Eolissochonetes pseudoliratus – type locality for species
- †Eoorthis
  - †Eoorthis remnicha
- †Euconia
  - †Euconia umbilicata
- †Euloma
- †Eumetria
  - †Eumetria acuticosta
  - †Eumetria vera – or unidentified comparable form
  - †Eumetria verneuilana – or unidentified comparable form
  - †Eumetria verneuiliana – or unidentified comparable form
- †Euphemites
  - †Euphemites crenulatus
  - †Euphemites sacajawensis
- †Euphemitopsis
  - †Euphemitopsis paucinodosus – or unidentified comparable form
  - †Euphemitopsis subpapillosa
- †Exochops

== F ==
- †Faberophyllum
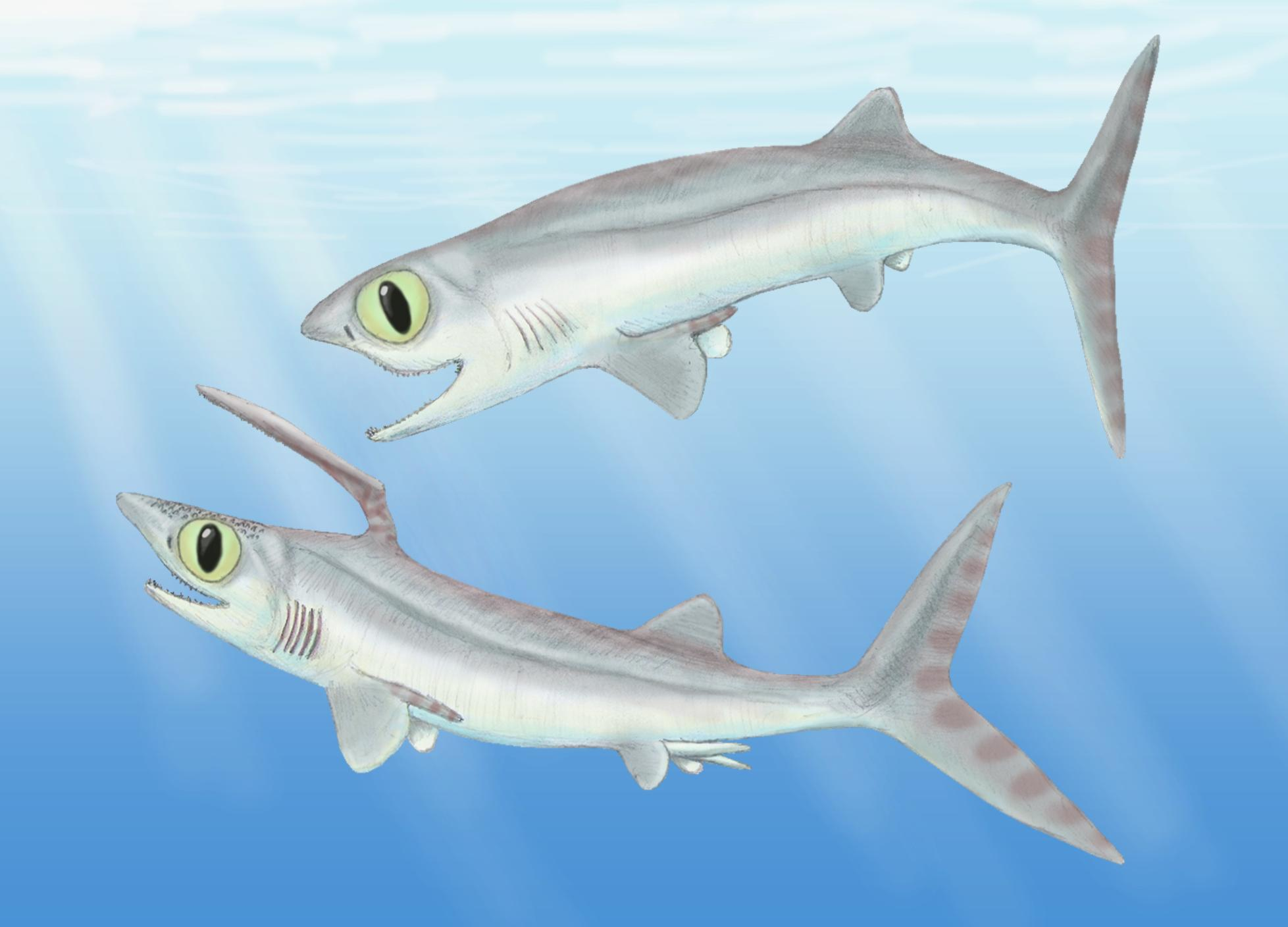
- Life restorations of a female (top) and male (bottom) of the Carboniferous Chimaera relative Falcatus
  †Falcatus
  - †Falcatus falcatus
- †Fasciculiamplexus
- †Fasciculophyllum
- †Favosites
- †Fenestella
- †Fenestralia – tentative report
- †Fenestrella
- †Finestrella – tentative report
- †Floweria
  - †Floweria chemungensis – or unidentified comparable form
- †Furcaster

== G ==
- †Gattendorfia
  - †Gattendorfia costata
- †Gennaeocrinus – or unidentified comparable form
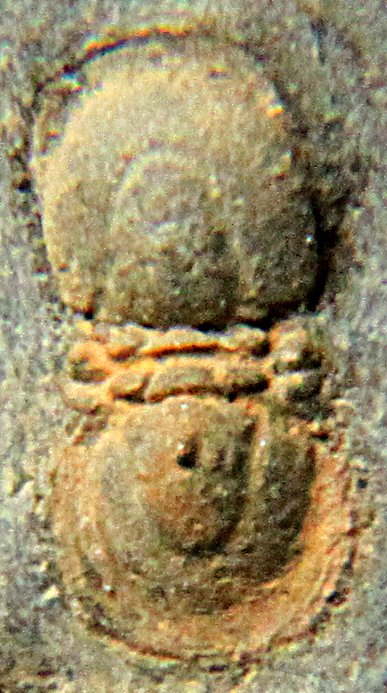
- Fossil of the Early-Late Ordovician trilobite Geragnostus
  †Geragnostus
- †Girtyella
  - †Girtyella indianensis
  - †Girtyella woodsworthi – or unidentified comparable form
  - †Girtyella woodworthi
- †Glabretina – type locality for genus
  - †Glabretina andrewsi – type locality for species
- †Glabrocingulum – tentative report
- †Glaphyraspis
  - †Glaphyraspis parva
- †Glossopleura
- †Glyphaspis
  - †Glyphaspis robusta
- †Grammysia
  - †Grammysia G. welleri – or unidentified comparable form
- †Graphiadactyllis
- †Guizhoupecten

== H ==
- †Hadronector – type locality for genus
  - †Hadronector donbairdi – type locality for species
- †Hallograptus
- †Hamburgia – tentative report
  - †Hamburgia walteri – or unidentified comparable form
- †Hammatocyclus
- †Haplistion
- †Hapsiphyllum
- †Hardistiella – type locality for genus
  - †Hardistiella montanensis – type locality for species
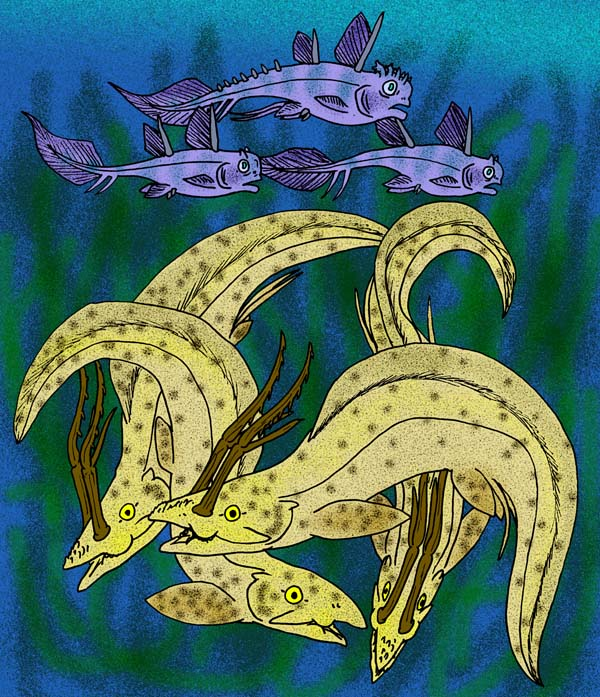
- Restoration (bottom) of the Carboniferous "antlered" Chimaera relative Harpagofututor
  †Harpagofututor – type locality for genus
  - †Harpagofututor volsellorhinus – type locality for species
- †Helicoprion
- †Heteralosia
  - †Heteralosia beecheri
- †Heteropecten
  - †Heteropecten vanvleeti – or unidentified comparable form
- †Heteropetalus – type locality for genus
  - †Heteropetalus elegantulus – type locality for species

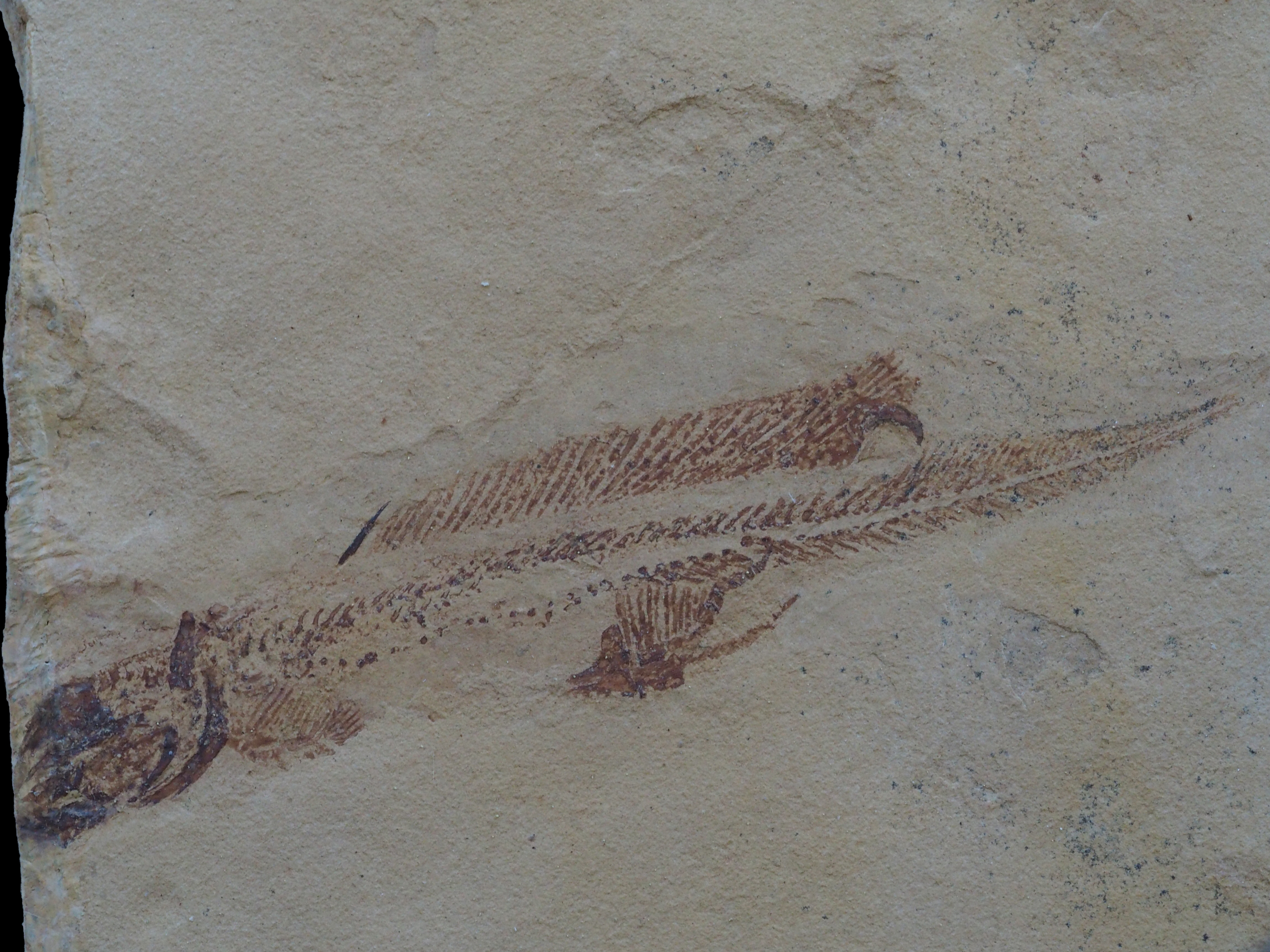
†Heteropetalus elegantulus Lund 1977 from the Mississippian of Bear Gulch

- †Homalophyllites
- †Homotreta
  - †Homotreta interrupta
- †Hormotoma
- †Horridonia – report made of unidentified related form or using admittedly obsolete nomenclature
- †Housia
  - †Housia canadensis
- †Huenella
- †Hunanospirifer
  - †Hunanospirifer animasensis
  - †Hunanospirifer gallatinensis – tentative report
  - †Hunanospirifer monticola
- †Hustedia
  - †Hustedia texana
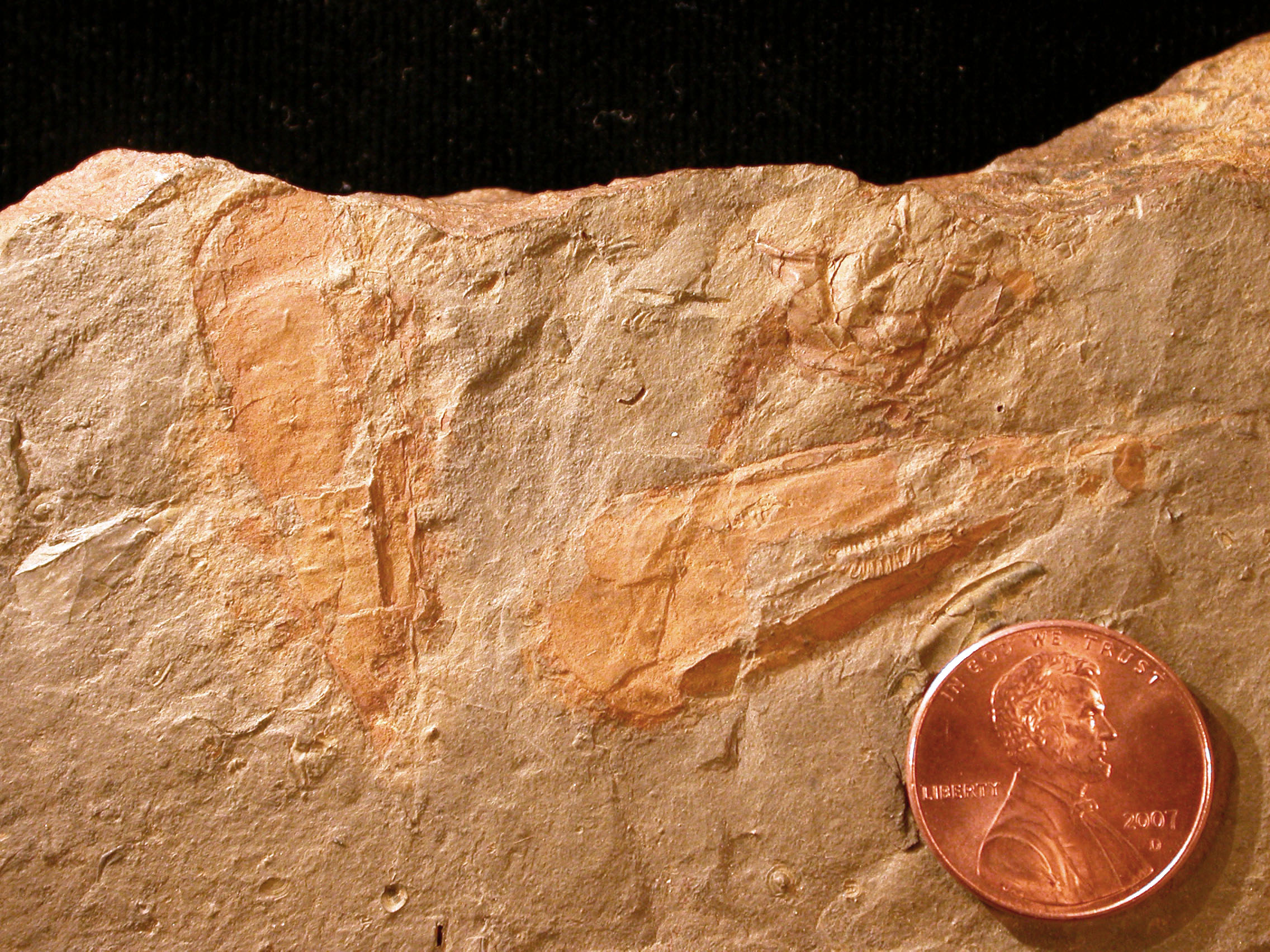
- Fossilized shells of the Cambrian-Permian brachiopod relative Hyolitha
  †Hyolithes
- Hyperammina
- †Hypothyris
- †Hypseloconus
  - †Hypseloconus elongatus
  - †Hypseloconus simplex
- †Hystriculina
  - †Hystriculina wabashensis – or unidentified comparable form
- †Hystricurus

== I ==
- †Icodonta
  - †Icodonta nixonensis – or unidentified comparable form
  - †Icodonta typica
- †Idahoia
- †Imbrexia
- †Imbricatia
- †Imitoceras
- †Inflatia
  - †Inflatia inflata – or unidentified comparable form
- †Iphidella
  - †Iphidella hexagona
  - †Iphidella nyssa
- †Irvingella

== J ==
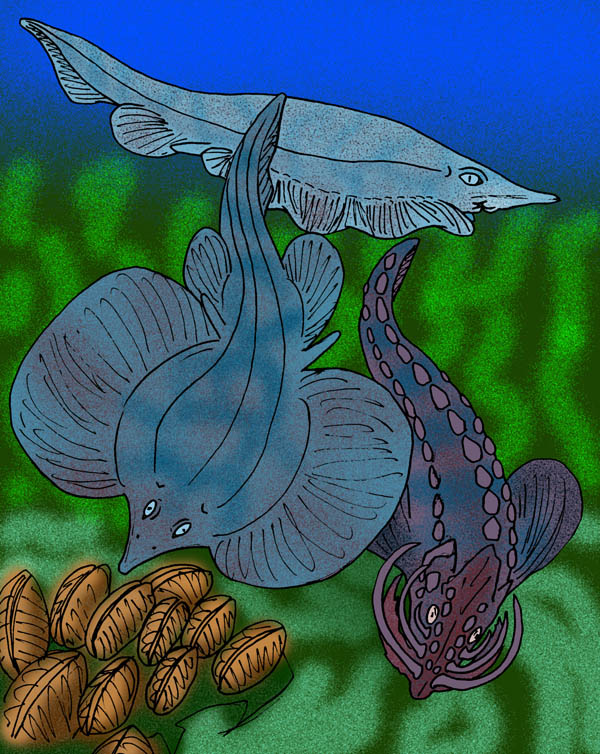
- Restoration of the Carboniferous-Permian ray-like cartilaginous fish Janassa (top and left)
  †Janassa
  - †Janassa clarki – type locality for species
- †Joanellia
  - †Joanellia lundi
- †Juresania

== K ==
- †Kainella
  - †Kainella flagricauda
- †Kallimorphocrinus
- †Kalops
  - †Kalops diophrys
  - †Kalops monophrys
- †Katabuporhynchus
  - †Katabuporhynchus mesacostalis
- †Kayseraspis
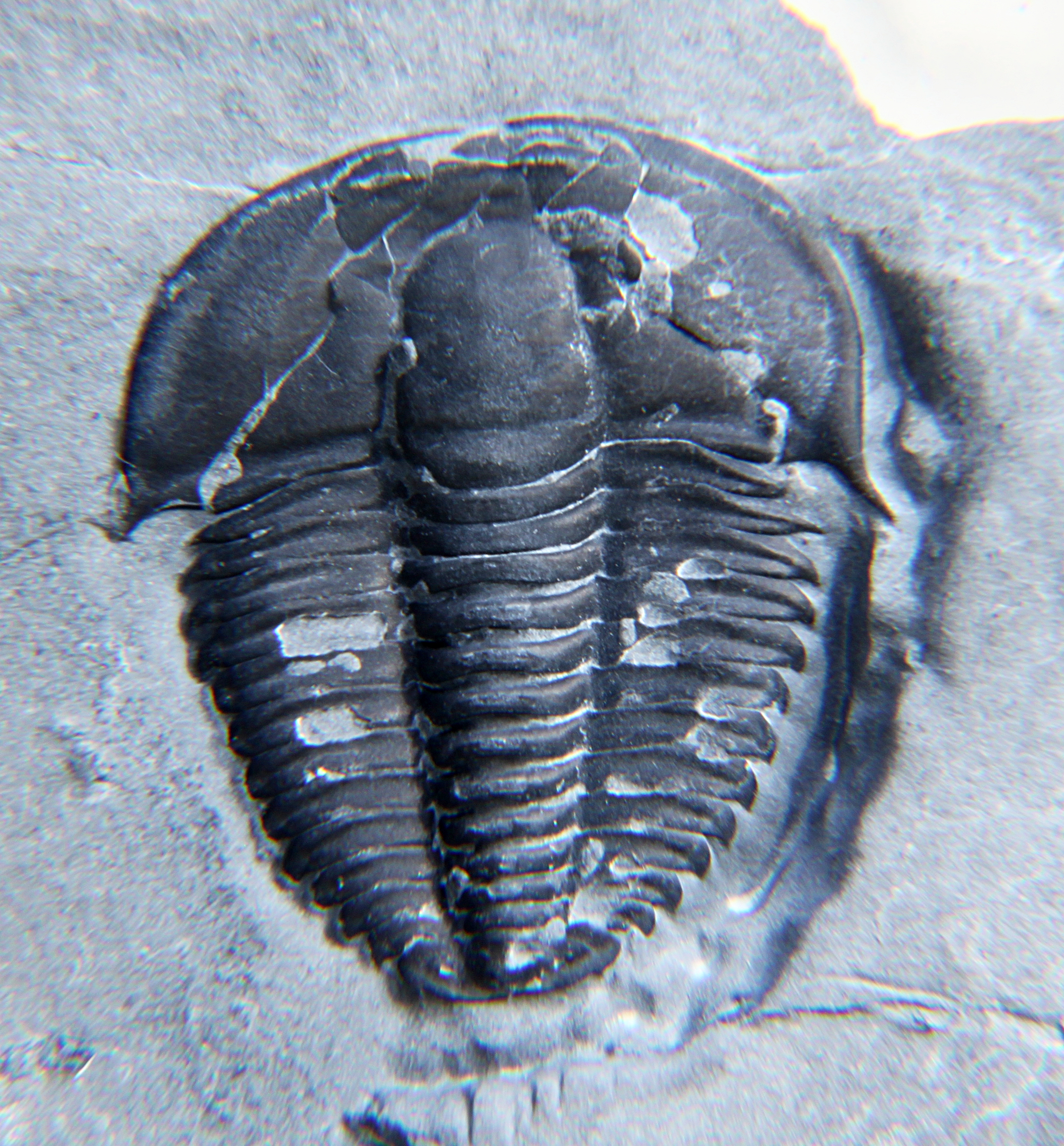
- Fossil of the Cambrian trilobite Kendallina
  †Kendallina
- †Kindbladia
- †Komiella
  - †Komiella ostiolata
- †Koninkophyllum – tentative report
- †Kootenia
- †Kyphocephalus

== L ==
- †Labiostria
- †Laminatia
  - †Laminatia laminata – tentative report
- †Langepis
  - †Langepis campbelli
- †Lecanospira
- †Leioestheria
- †Leioproductus
  - †Leioproductus coloradensis
  - †Leioproductus montanensis – type locality for species
  - †Leioproductus plicatus
- †Leiorhynchus
  - †Leiorhynchus carboniferus
  - †Leiorhynchus dunbarense – or unidentified comparable form
  - †Leiorhynchus gibbosa – or unidentified comparable form
  - †Leiorhynchus jeffersonense
  - †Leiorhynchus lesleyi
  - †Leiorhynchus seversoni
  - †Leiorhynchus ventricosa
  - †Leiorhynchus ventricosta – or unidentified related form
- †Lepidasterella
  - †Lepidasterella montanensis – type locality for species
- †Leptaena
- †Leptagonia
  - †Leptagonia analoga
- †Leptalosia
  - †Leptalosia scintilla – tentative report
- †Leptella
- †Leptodesma
- †Leptodus
- †Leptotrypella
- †Liardiphyllum
- †Licnocephala
- †Limipecten
  - †Limipecten grandicostatus – or unidentified comparable form
  - †Limipecten otterensis – type locality for species
- †Lineagruan – type locality for genus
  - †Lineagruan judithi – type locality for species
  - †Lineagruan snowyi – type locality for species
- †Lingula
  - †Lingula carbonaria – or unidentified comparable form
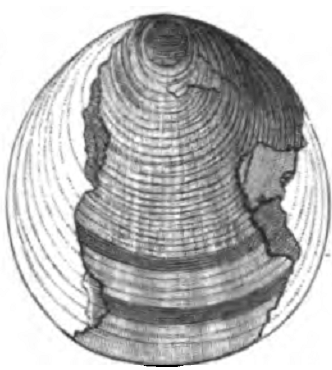
- Illustration of a fossilized shell of the Cambrian-Late Ordovician brachiopod Lingulella
  †Lingulella
  - †Lingulella ibicus
- †Lingulepis
- †Linnarssonella
  - †Linnarssonella girtyi
- †Linnarssonia
  - †Linnarssonia perplexa
  - †Linnarssonia rotunda
- †Linoproductus
  - †Linoproductus croneisi
  - †Linoproductus duodenaris – type locality for species
  - †Linoproductus nodosus
  - †Linoproductus ovatus
- †Lioestheria
- †Lithostrotion
- †Lithostrotionella
  - †Lithostrotionella microstylum Grity
- Lituotuba – tentative report
- †Lloydia
  - †Lloydia incomperta
  - †Lloydia manitouensis – or unidentified comparable form
- †Lochmocercus – type locality for genus
  - †Lochmocercus aciculodontus – type locality for species
- †Lonchodina
  - †Lonchodina projecta
- †Longiclava – type locality for genus
  - †Longiclava tumida – type locality for species
- †Loxonema
  - †Loxonema approximatum
- †Lyroschizodus
  - †Lyroschizodus oklahomensis – or unidentified comparable form

== M ==
- †Macluritella
  - †Macluritella stantoni – or unidentified related form
- †Macronoda
- †Maladia
- †Marginifera
- †Marginovatia
  - †Marginovatia duodenaria
- †Martinia
- †Maryvillia
  - †Maryvillia omega – type locality for species
- †Mastigograptus
- †Megalaspidella
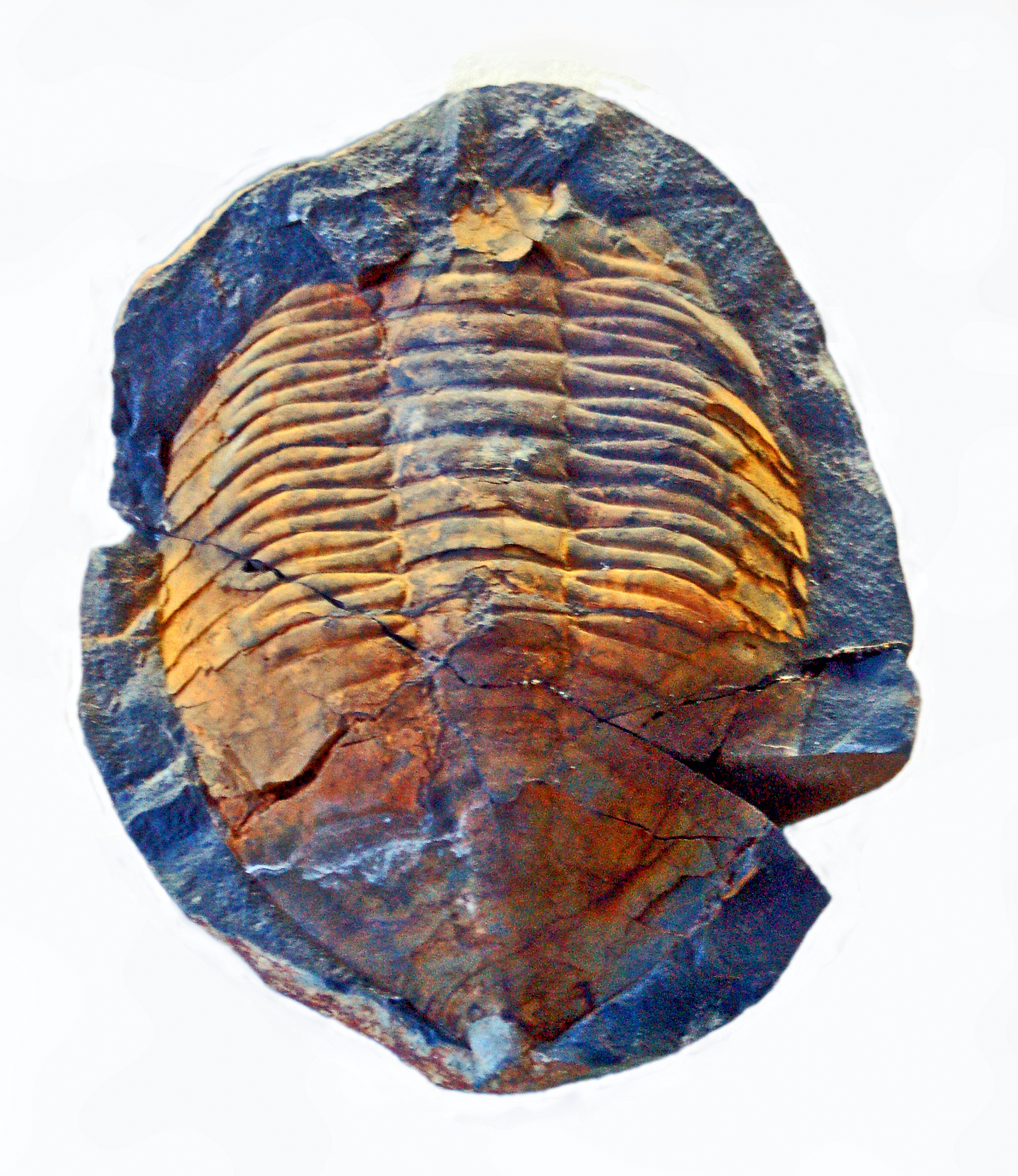
- Fossil of the Cambrian-Silurian trilobite Megistaspis
  †Megistaspis
- †Megistocrinus – or unidentified comparable form
- †Metriophyllum
- †Michelinia
- †Microantyx
  - †Microantyx botoni
  - †Microantyx mudgei
  - †Microantyx permiana
- †Micromitra
  - †Micromitra sculptilis
  - †Micromitra subdita
- †Millerella
- †Monocheilus
- †Mooreoceras – tentative report
- †Multivasculatus
- †Myalina
  - †Myalina meeki
  - †Myalina parallela – type locality for species

== N ==
- †Nanorthis
  - †Nanorthis putilla
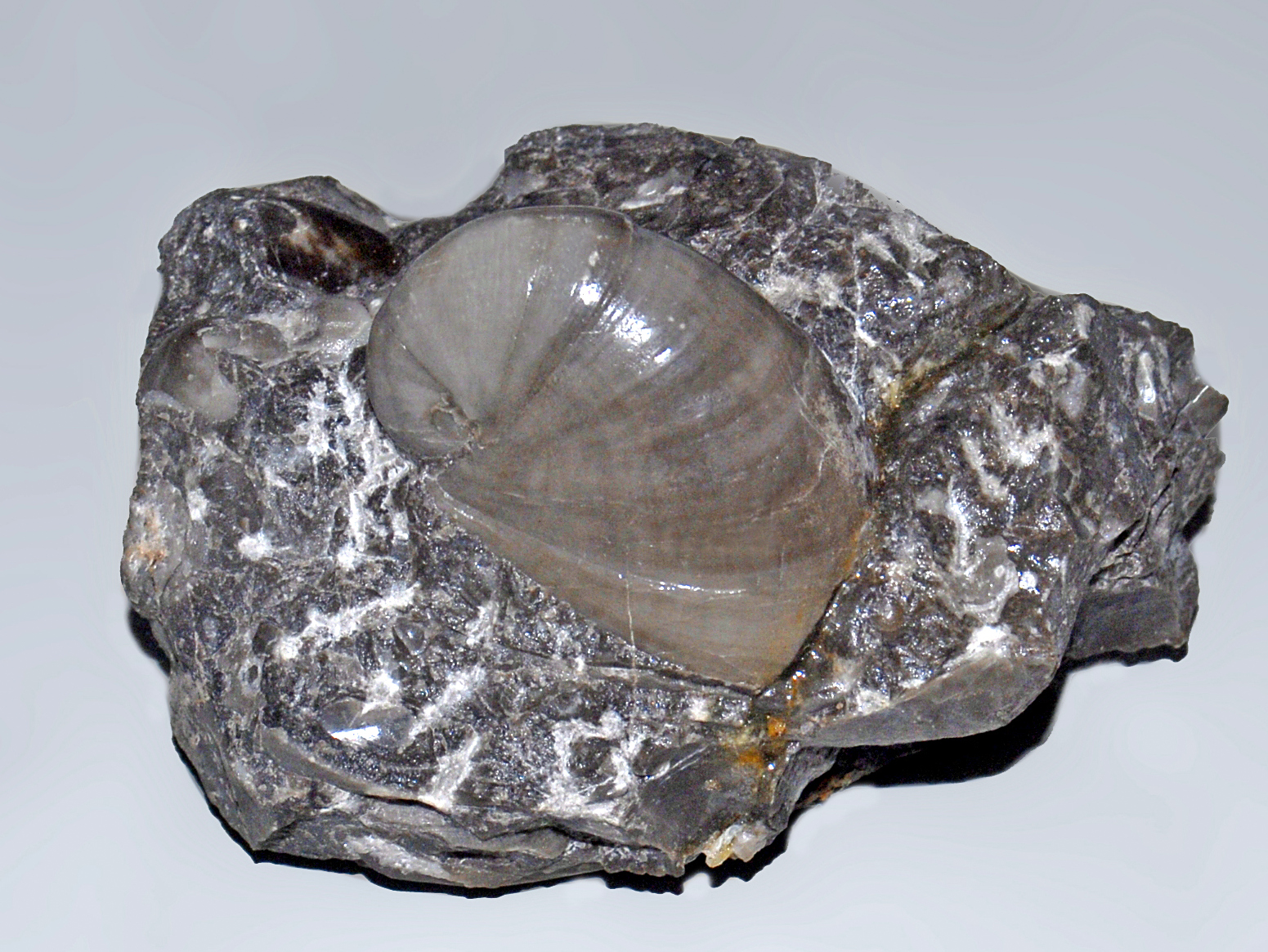
- Fossilized shell of the Early Devonian – Triassic sea snail Naticopsis
  †Naticopsis
  - †Naticopsis remex – or unidentified comparable form
- †Nemavermes
  - †Nemavermes mackeei
- †Neoprioniodus
- †Neospirifer
  - †Neospirifer praenuntius – type locality for species
  - †Neospirifer striatus
- †Neozaphrentis
  - †Neozaphrentis parasitica
- †Netsepoye – type locality for genus
  - †Netsepoye hawesi – type locality for species
- †Nickelsopora
- †Nisusia
  - †Nisusia deissi
  - †Nisusia lickensis
  - †Nisusia montanaensis
- †Nix – type locality for genus
  - †Nix angulata – type locality for species
- †Nucleospira
  - †Nucleospira obesa
- Nuculana
  - †Nuculana biangulata – type locality for species
- †Nuculopsis
  - †Nuculopsis poposiensis

== O ==
- †Obolus
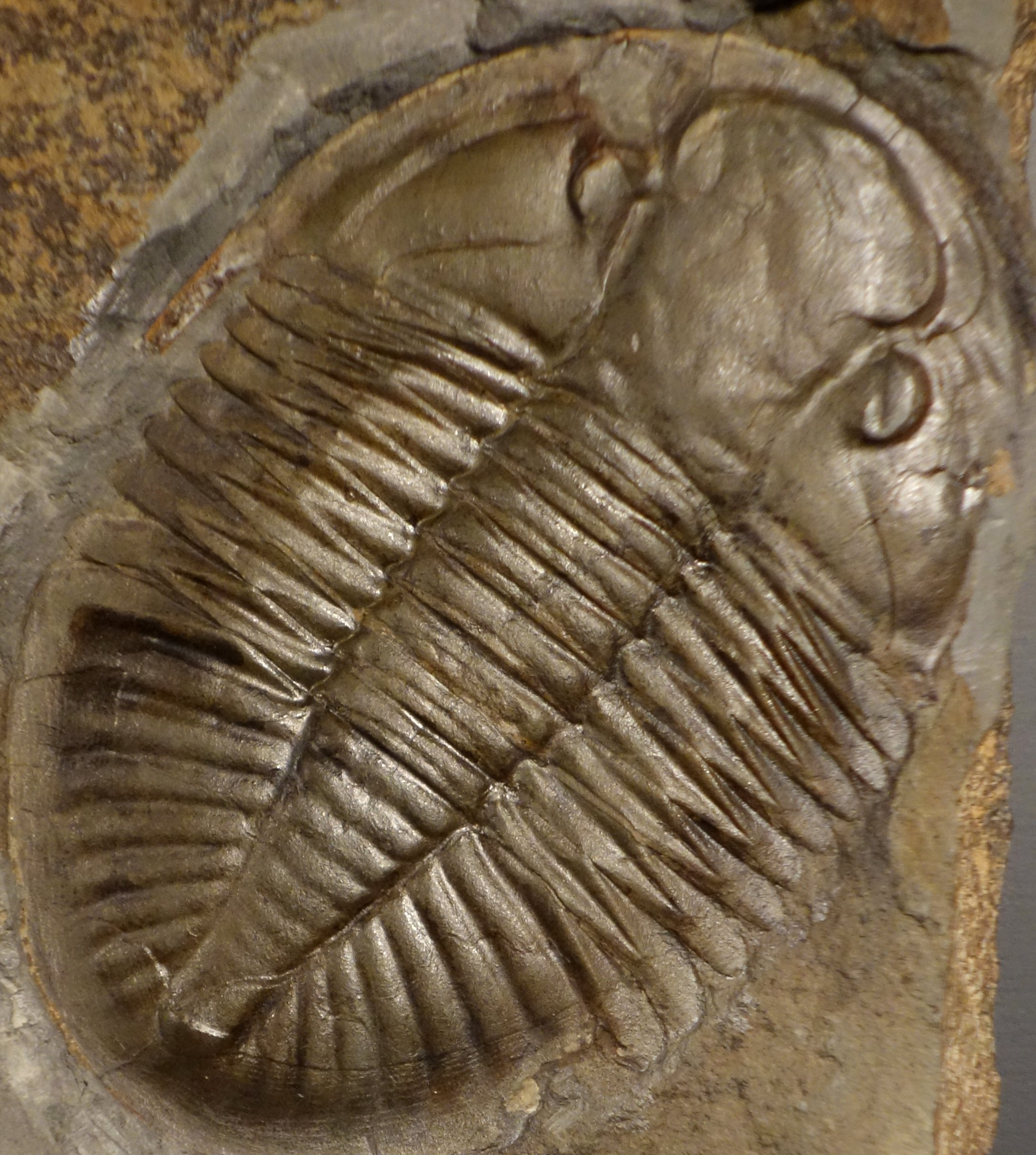
- Fossil of the Ordovician trilobite Ogyginus
  †Ogyginus
- †Olenopsis
- †Orbiculoidea
  - †Orbiculoidea interlineata – type locality for species
  - †Orbiculoidea missouriensis – or unidentified comparable form
  - †Orbiculoidea utahensis
- †Orbinaria
- †Orthonychia
- †Orthotetes
- †Orygmaspis
- †Ovatia
  - †Ovatia croneisi
- †Oxinoxis
- †Ozarkodina
  - †Ozarkodina deflecta
  - †Ozarkodina elongata
  - †Ozarkodina macilenta
  - †Ozarkodina modesta
  - †Ozarkodina regularis

== P ==
- †Paladin – tentative report
- †Palaeoneilo
  - †Palaeoneilo elongata
- †Palaeonucula
  - †Palaeonucula montanensis
- †Paleolimulus
  - †Paleolimulus longispinus
- †Papilionichthys – type locality for genus
  - †Papilionichthys stahlae – type locality for species
- †Parabolinoides
- †Paracyclus
- †Paraparchites
- †Paraphorhynchus
  - †Paraphorhynchus ashboughense – type locality for species
  - †Paraphorhynchus jeffersonense
  - †Paraphorhynchus madisonense
  - †Paraphorhynchus threeforkensis – type locality for species
  - †Paraphorhynchus threeforksense
- †Paratarrasius – type locality for genus
  - †Paratarrasius hibbardi – type locality for species

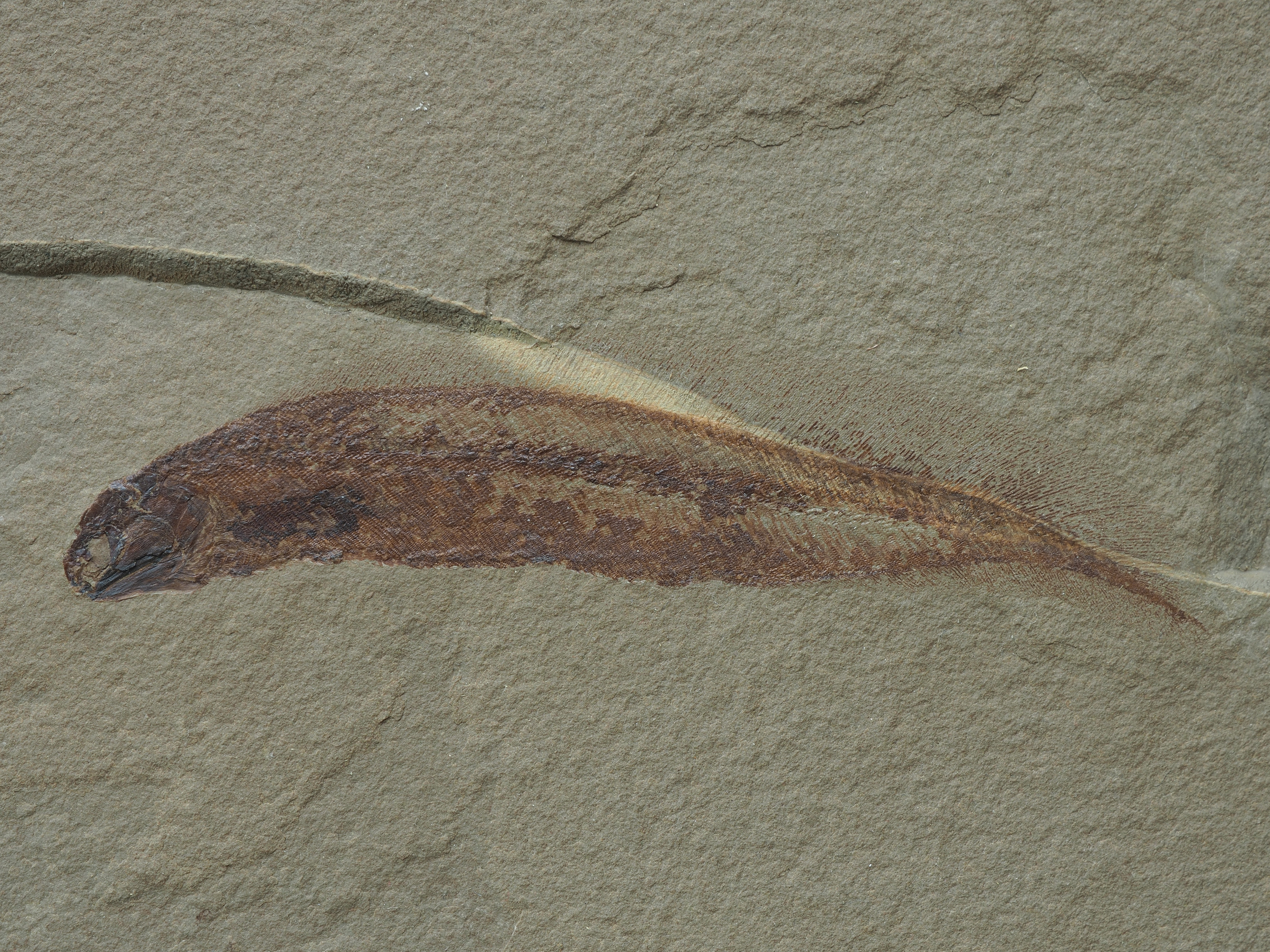
†Paratarrasius hibbardi Carboniferous Bear Gulch, Montana

- †Pegmatrea – or unidentified related form
- †Pelagiella
- †Peltabellia
  - †Peltabellia willistoni – type locality for species
- †Pennireptepora
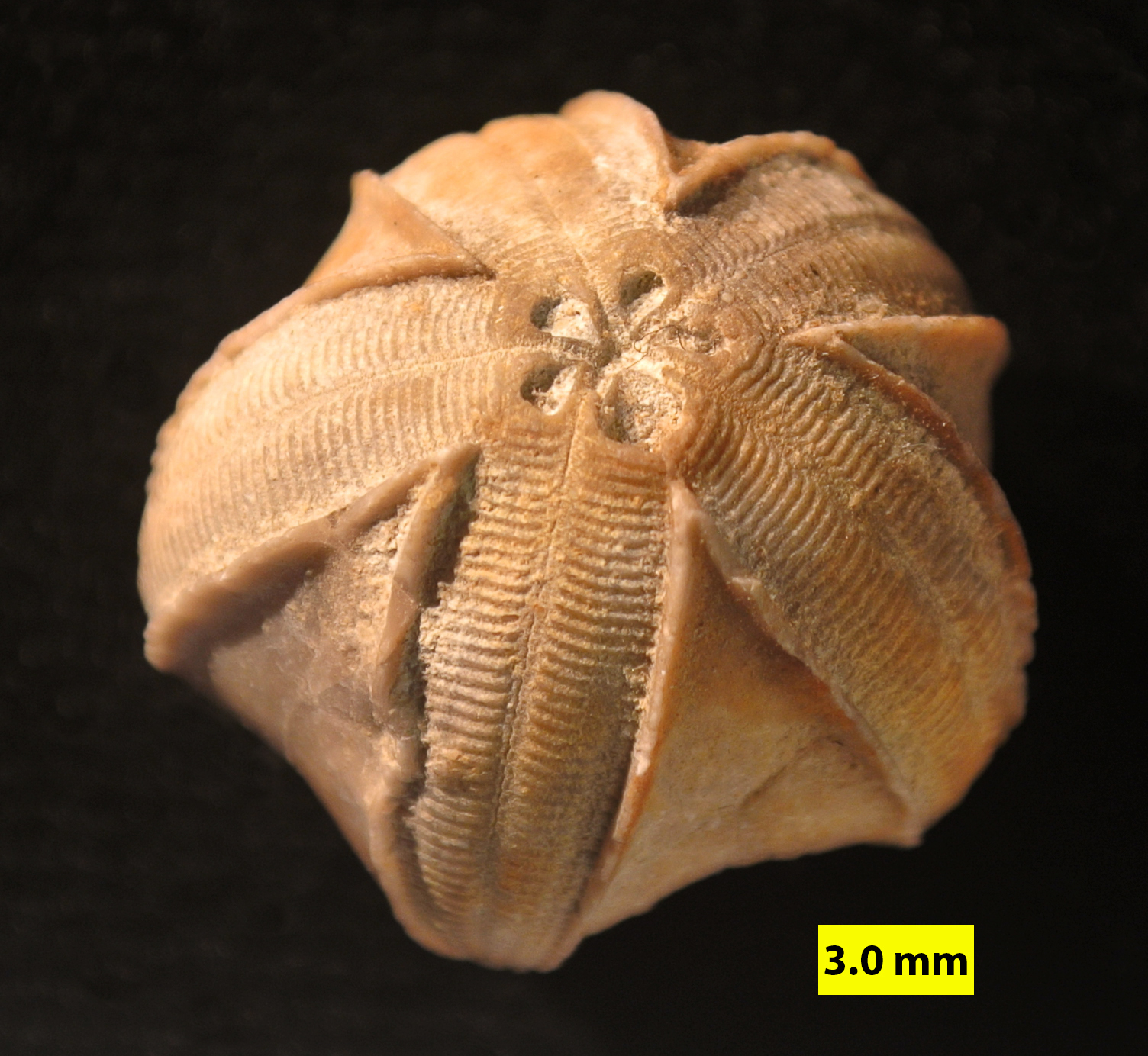
- Fossilized theca of the Carboniferous blastoid echinoderm ("sea bud") Pentremites
  †Pentremites
- †Perditocardinia
- †Pericyclus
  - †Pericyclus rockymontanus – type locality for species
- †Permophorus
  - †Permophorus albequus
- †Pernoceras
  - †Pernoceras crebriseptum
- †Peronopsis
  - †Peronopsis scutalis – or unidentified comparable form
- †Petalorhynchus
  - †Petalorhynchus beargulchensis – type locality for species
- †Petrocrania
  - †Petrocrania modesta – or unidentified comparable form
- †Phestia
  - †Phestia rugodorsata – type locality for species
- †Phiops – type locality for genus
  - †Phiops aciculorum – type locality for species
- †Pinctus
- †Pinna
  - †Pinna ludlovi
- †Plagioglypta
- †Platyceras
  - †Platyceras niagarensis – or unidentified comparable form
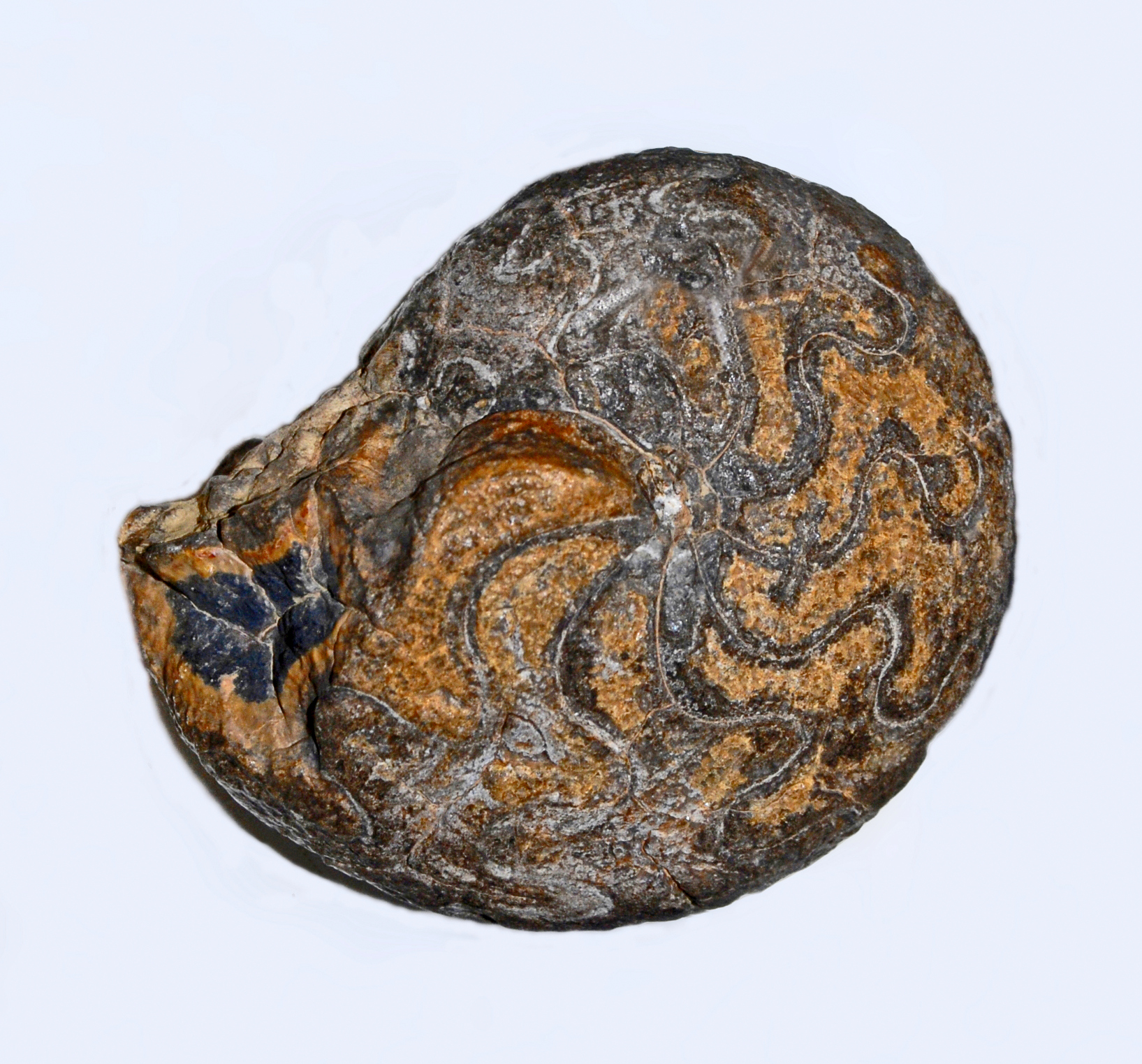
- Fossilized shell of the Late Devonian ammonoid cephalopod Platyclymenia
  †Platyclymenia
  - †Platyclymenia montana
- †Platycrinus
  - †Platycrinus bozemanensis
  - †Platycrinus incomptus
- †Plectodiscus
  - †Plectodiscus latinautilus
- †Plectospira – tentative report
  - †Plectospira problematica – or unidentified comparable form
- †Plethopeltis
- †Plethospira
- †Pleuroclymenia
  - †Pleuroclymenia americana
- †Polidevcia
  - †Polidevcia obesa
- †Polyosteorhynchus – type locality for genus
  - †Polyosteorhynchus simplex – type locality for species
- †Polypora
- †Polyrhizodus
  - †Polyrhizodus digitatus
- †Praepatokephalus
- †Presbynileus
- †Proceramala – type locality for genus
  - †Proceramala montanensis – type locality for species
- †Procostatoria
  - †Procostatoria sexradiata
- †Prodentalium
  - †Prodentalium canna
- †Productella
  - †Productella coloradensis
  - †Productella coloradoense – or unidentified comparable form
  - †Productella coloradoensis
  - †Productella plicata – or unidentified comparable form
  - †Productella spinerga – or unidentified comparable form
- †Productus
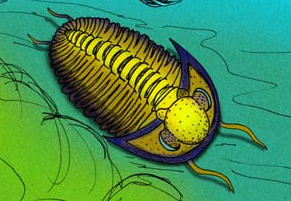
- Restoration of the Silurian trilobite Proetus
  †Proetus
- †Prographularia
  - †Prographularia groenlandica – or unidentified comparable form
- †Promesus
- †Proplina
  - †Proplina loganensis – type locality for species
- †Protopliomerops
- †Prototreta
  - †Prototreta flabellata
  - †Prototreta subcircularis
  - †Prototreta trapeza
- †Psalikilus
  - †Psalikilus paraspinosum
- †Psammodus
- †Pseudagnostus
- †Pseudoclelandia
- †Pseudodicellomus
- †Pseudogastrioceras
- †Pseudomonotis
- †Pseudopermophorus
  - †Pseudopermophorus annettae – type locality for species
- †Pseudozygopleura
  - †Pseudozygopleura scitula – or unidentified related form
- †Pterocephalia
- †Ptilograptus
- †Ptychagnostus
  - †Ptychagnostus atavus
- †Ptychaspis
- †Ptychomalotoechia
  - †Ptychomalotoechia sobrina
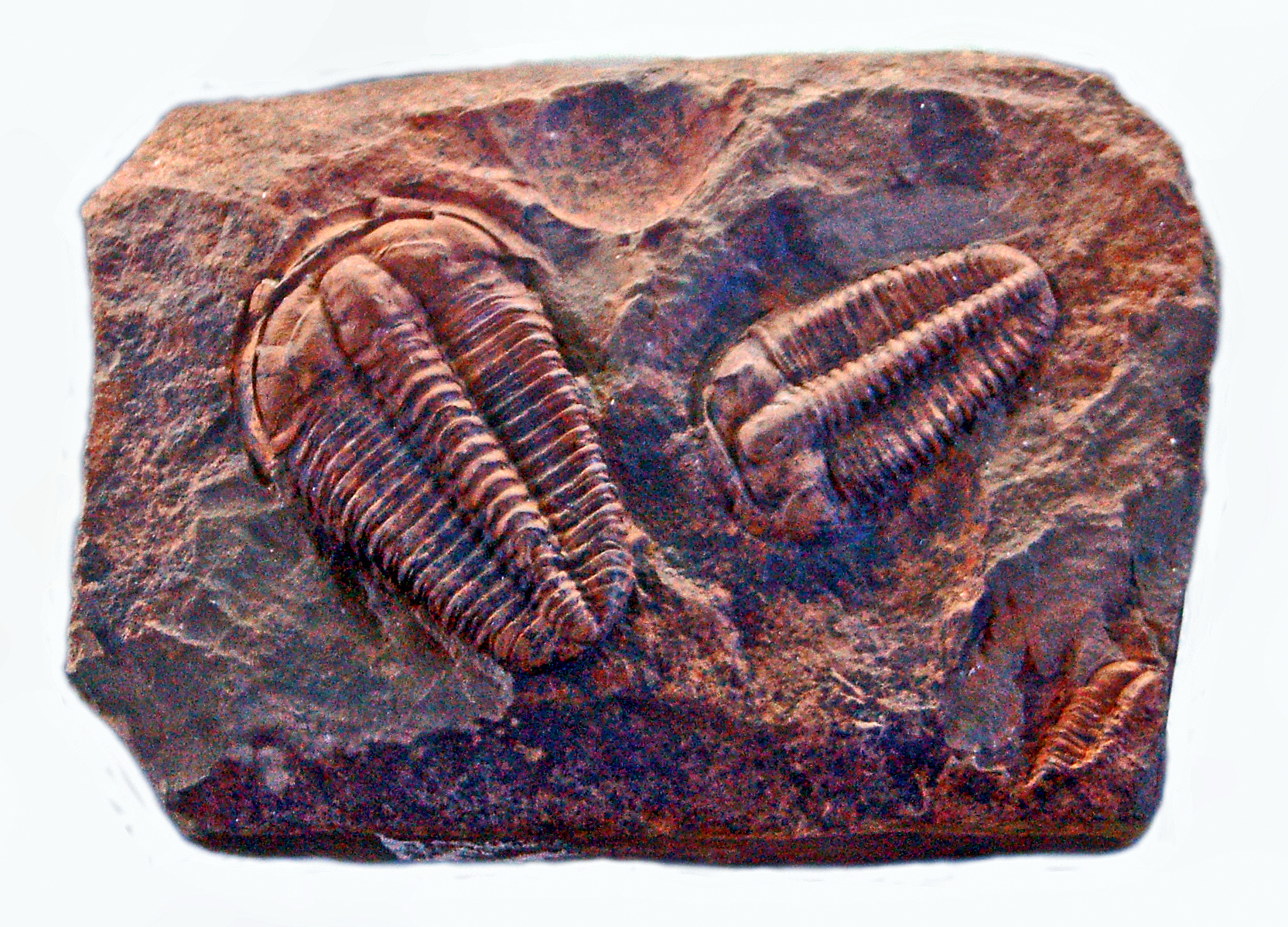
- Fossils of the Cambrian trilobite Ptychoparia
  †Ptychoparia
- †Ptyocephalus
  - †Ptyocephalus montanensis – type locality for species
- †Pugnoides
  - †Pugnoides parvulus
- †Punctolira
  - †Punctolira punctolira
- †Punctospirifer
  - †Punctospirifer transversus
- †Pustula

== R ==
- †Rachistognathus
- †Rainerichthys – type locality for genus
  - †Rainerichthys zangerli – type locality for species
- †Ramesses – type locality for genus
  - †Ramesses magnus – type locality for species
- †Ramiporalia
- †Raphistomina
- †Renalcis
- †Reticularia
- †Reticulariina
  - †Reticulariina browni
  - †Reticulariina spinosa
- †Reticularina
  - †Reticularina spinosa
- †Retispira
- †Reubenella – type locality for genus
  - †Reubenella rex – type locality for species
- †Rhabdomeson
- †Rhineoderma
- †Rhipidomella
  - †Rhipidomella missouriensis
  - †Rhipidomella newalbanensis – or unidentified comparable form
- †Rhombopora
- †Rhynchopora
- †Rhynchotreta – tentative report
- †Rhytiophora
  - †Rhytiophora arcuatus
- †Rhytiopora
  - †Rhytiopora arcuatus – tentative report
- †Rota
  - †Rota martini
- †Rotiphyllum
- †Rugoclostus
- †Rylstonia
- †Rystonia
  - †Rystonia R. teres (Grity) – or unidentified comparable form

== S ==
- Saccammina
- †Sanguinolites
  - †Sanguinolites altidorsata – type locality for species
- †Saratogia
- †Saukia
- †Scalarituba
  - †Scalarituba missouriensis
- †Scapallina
  - †Scapallina phosphoriensis
- †Scaphellina
  - †Scaphellina concinna
- †Scaphiomanon – type locality for genus
  - †Scaphiomanon hadros – type locality for species
  - †Scaphiomanon nodulosum – type locality for species
- †Schallwienella
- †Schellwienella
  - †Schellwienella inflata
- †Schizambon
- †Schizodus
  - †Schizodus bifidus – type locality for species
- †Schizopea
- †Schizophoria
  - †Schizophoria australis
  - †Schizophoria compacta
  - †Schizophoria depressa – type locality for species
  - †Schizophoria striatula
  - †Schizophoria strophodonta
- †Schuchertalla
- †Schuchertella
  - †Schuchertella arctostriata
  - †Schuchertella extensus – or unidentified comparable form
  - †Schuchertella inflata
  - †Schuchertella lens
  - †Schuchertella nodocostata
- †Scolopodus
  - †Scolopodus quadraplicatus
- †Sentosia
  - †Sentosia spinigera – or unidentified comparable form
- †Septimyalina
- †Shizophoria
  - †Shizophoria chouteauensis
  - †Shizophoria swalleri
- †Shumardella
  - †Shumardella dunbarensis
- †Siksika – type locality for genus
  - †Siksika ottae – type locality for species
- †Sinuella
- †Soleniscus
- †Solenopleurella
- †Soris – type locality for genus
  - †Soris labiosus – type locality for species
- †Spathognathodus
  - †Spathognathodus peculiaris
- †Sphenosteges
- †Sphenotus
  - †Sphenotus altidorsatus – or unidentified comparable form
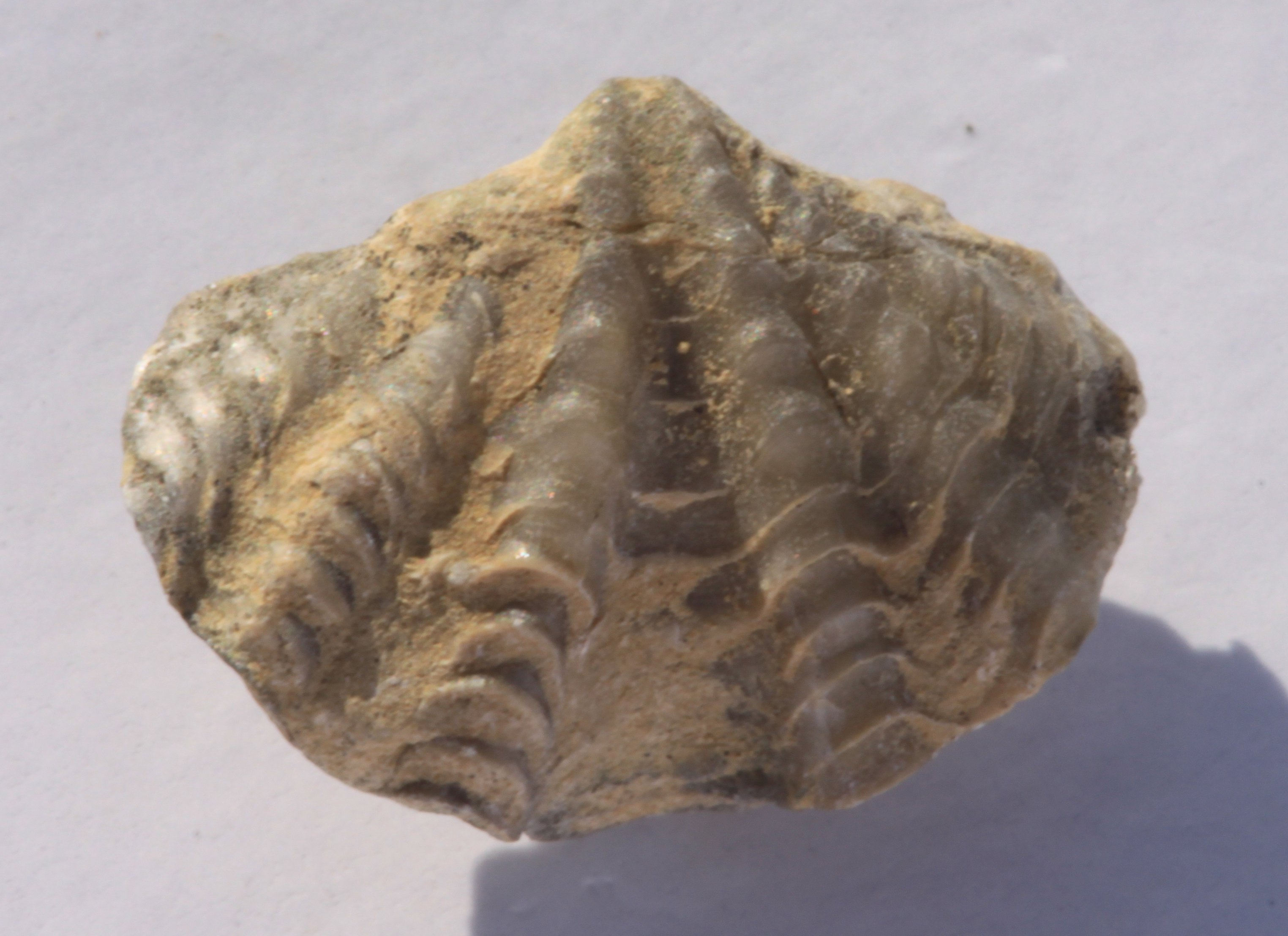
- Fossilized shell of the Late Ordovician-Late Triassic brachiopod Spirifer
  †Spirifer
  - †Spirifer brazerianus – or unidentified related form
  - †Spirifer centronatus
  - †Spirifer greenockensis – or unidentified comparable form
  - †Spirifer grimesi
  - †Spirifer louisianensis – or unidentified related form
  - †Spirifer marionensis – or unidentified comparable form
  - †Spirifer mudulus
  - †Spirifer raymondi
  - †Spirifer S. centronatus Winchell – or unidentified comparable form
  - †Spirifer S. grimesi Hall – or unidentified comparable form
  - †Spirifer shoshonensis
  - †Spirifer welleri – tentative report
- †Spiriferina
  - †Spiriferina solidirostris – or unidentified comparable form
- Spirorbis
  - †Spirorbis kinderhookensis
  - †Spirorbis moreyi – or unidentified related form
- †Spraparallus
- †Squamaria
- †Squatinactis – type locality for genus
  - †Squatinactis caudispinatus – type locality for species
- †Squillites – type locality for genus
  - †Squillites spinosus – type locality for species
- †Stenoglaphyrites
  - †Stenoglaphyrites hesperius
- †Stenoscisma
  - †Stenoscisma obesa
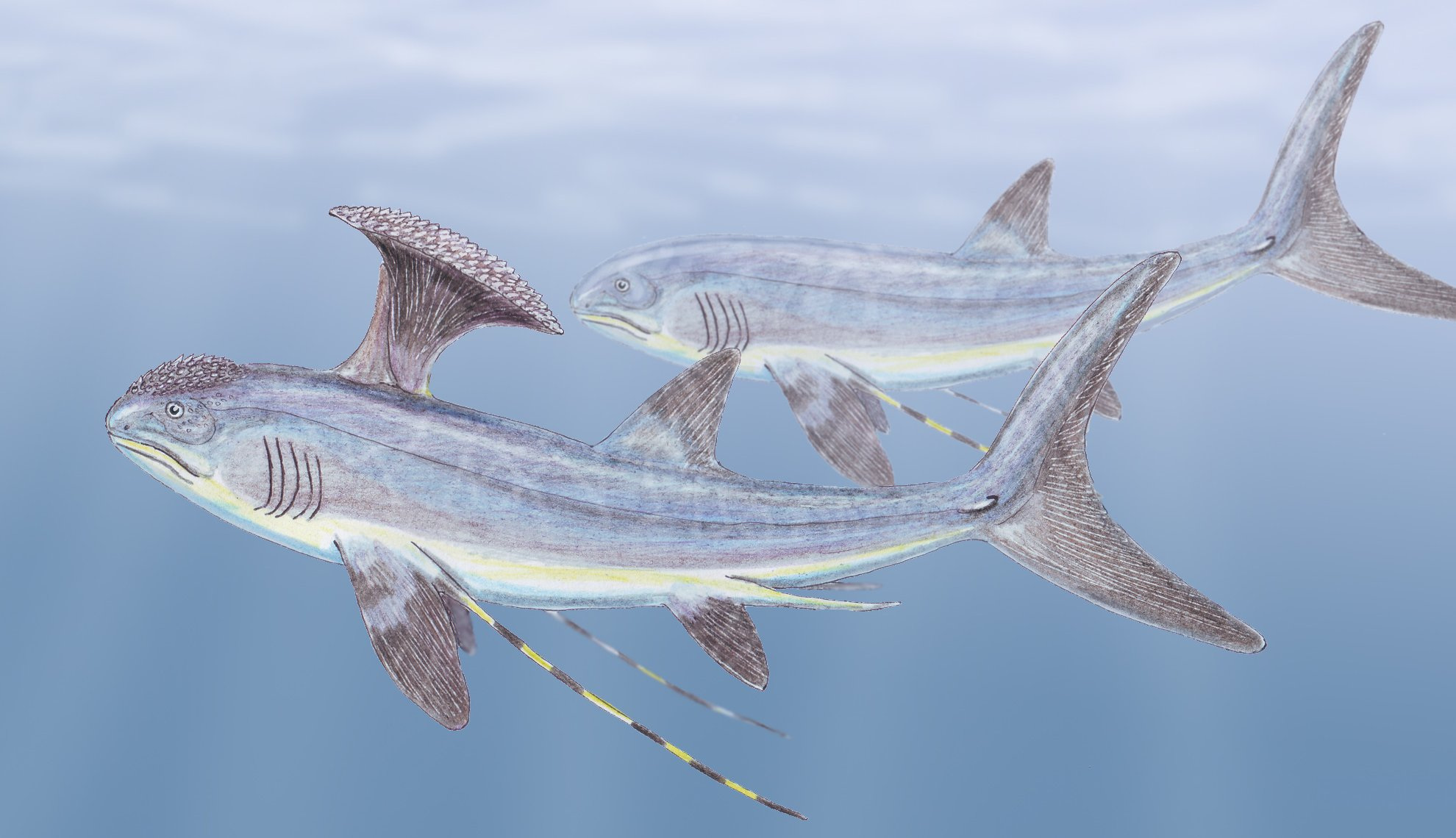
- Life restorations of a male (foreground) and female (background) of the Late Devonian-Carboniferous Chimaera relative Stethacanthus
  †Stethacanthus
  - †Stethacanthus altonensis
- †Stigmacephalus
- †Straparollus
- †Streblochondria
- †Stutchburia
- †Sulcocephalus
- †Sulcoretepora
- †Symphysurina
- †Syntrophina
  - †Syntrophina nana
- †Syntrophopsis
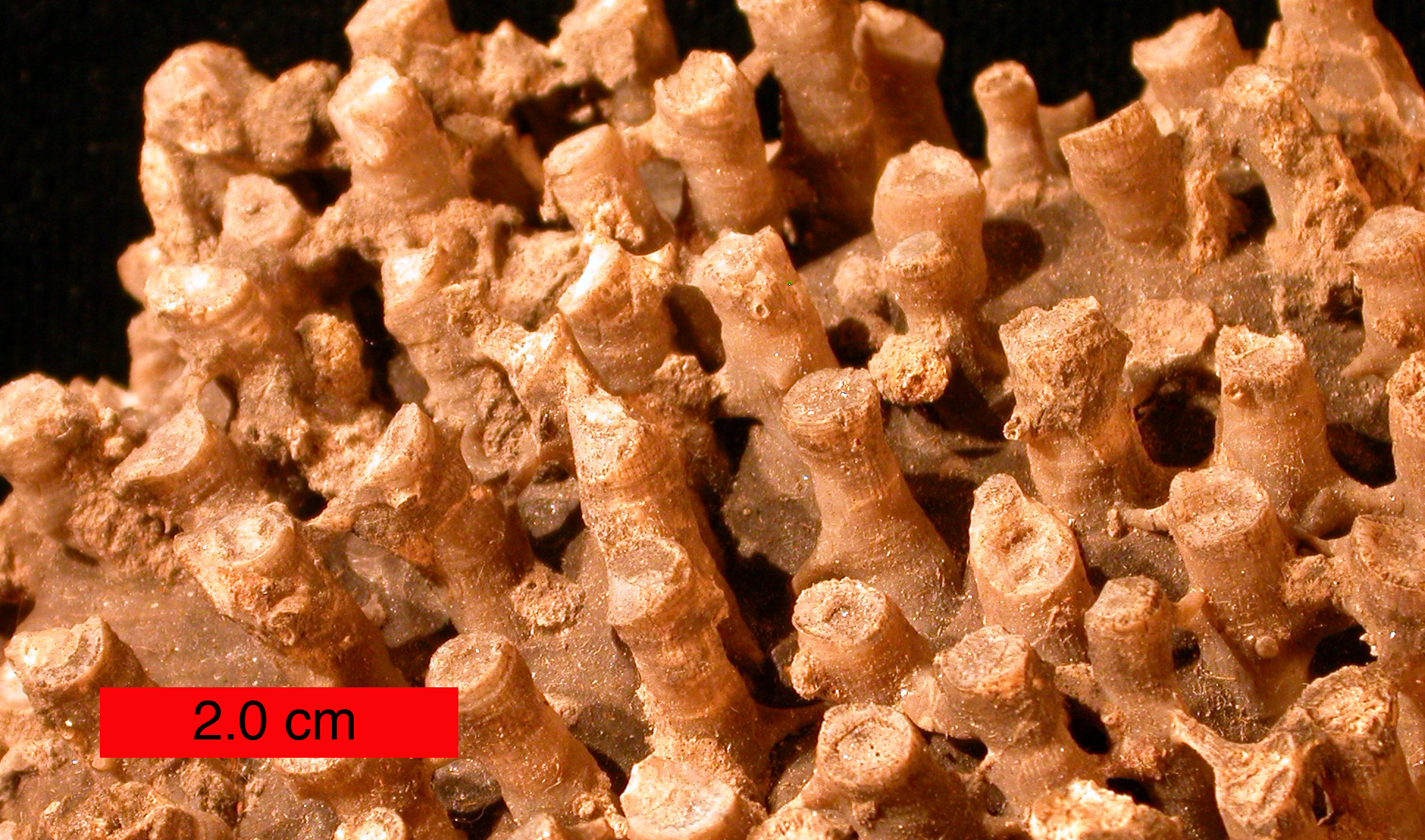
- Fossil of the Devonian tabulate coral Syringopora
  †Syringopora
  - †Syringopora aculeata Grity
  - †Syringopora suraularia – or unidentified related form
- †Syringospira
  - †Syringospira prima
- †Syringothyris
  - †Syringothyris hannibalensis
  - †Syringothyris typus – or unidentified comparable form

== T ==
- †Taenicephalus
- †Teiichispira
  - †Teiichispira affinis
- †Tetralobula
- †Thalattocanthus
  - †Thalattocanthus consonus
- †Thamnopora
- Thurammina
- †Thuroholia
  - †Thuroholia cribriformis
  - †Thuroholia spicatus
- †Thysanophyllum
- †Timaniella
  - †Timaniella pseudocamerata
- †Tolypammina
- †Tomagnostus
- †Tomasina – tentative report
- †Tonkinella
  - †Tonkinella stephenensis – or unidentified comparable form
- †Tornoceras
  - †Tornoceras crebiseptum
- †Torynifer
  - †Torynifer cooperensis
  - †Torynifer setiger – or unidentified comparable form
- †Torynifera
  - †Torynifera montanus
- †Trachelocrinus – tentative report
- †Triplophylliltes
  - †Triplophylliltes spinulosus – or unidentified comparable form
- †Trochophyllum
- †Tropidodiscus
- Tubulipora
  - †Tubulipora amsdenense – tentative report
- †Tylonautilus
- †Tylothyris
  - †Tylothyris clarkesvillensis
  - †Tylothyris clarksvillensis
  - †Tylothyris compacta
  - †Tylothyris novamexicana – or unidentified comparable form

== V ==
- †Vesiculophyllum
- †Vogelgnathus
  - †Vogelgnathus campbelli

== W ==
- †Warthia
- †Waylandella
- †Wellerella
  - †Wellerella osagensis – or unidentified comparable form
- †Wendyichthys – type locality for genus
  - †Wendyichthys dicksoni – type locality for species
  - †Wendyichthys lautreci – type locality for species
- †Westergaardodina
- †Whidbornella
  - †Whidbornella hirsuta
  - †Whidbornella lachrymosa
- †Wilbernia
- †Wilkingia
  - †Wilkingia inflata – type locality for species
  - †Wilkingia walkeri
- †Wimanella – type locality for genus
  - †Wimanella simplex – type locality for species
- †Worthenia – tentative report

== X ==
- †Xenostegium

== Y ==
- †Yochelsonellisa
  - †Yochelsonellisa eximia

== Z ==
- †Zaphrentites
- †Zaphriphyllum
