= Uraloceras =

Uraloceras Temporal range: Permian

Scientific classification
- Domain: Eukaryota
- Kingdom: Animalia
- Phylum: Mollusca
- Class: Cephalopoda
- Subclass: †Ammonoidea
- Order: †Goniatitida
- Family: †Paragastrioceratidae
- Subfamily: †Paragastrioceratinae
- Genus: †Uraloceras; Ruzhencev, 1936

Genus of molluscs (fossil)

Uraloceras is an ammonoid cephalopod genus belonging to the goniatitid family Paragastrioceratidae. The genus was named by Ruzhencev 1936 and is a jr. synonym of Pseudogastrioceras Spath 1930 according to Miller, Furnish and Schindeworlf, 1957. More recent classifications however list the two as distinct genera and put Uraloceras in the Paragastrioceratinae and Pseudogastrioceras in the Pseudogastrioceratinae.

Uraloceras, which comes from the Permian, is involute with a small to medium umbilicus and rounded venter. The shell is covered by longitudinal ribbing or coarse lirae. The suture, as characteristic of the family, has eight lobes, of which only the ventral one is bifurcate
