= Atsabitinae =

Scientific classification
- Kingdom: Animalia
- Phylum: Mollusca
- Class: Cephalopoda
- Subclass: †Ammonoidea
- Order: †Goniatitida
- Family: †Paragastrioceratidae
- Subfamily: †Atsabitinae; Furnish, 1966

Genera
- Anatsabites; Atsabites

Extinct subfamily of molluscs

Atsabitinae is a subfamily of the Paragastrioceratidae family. They are an extinct group of ammonoid, which are shelled cephalopods related to squids, belemnites, octopuses, and cuttlefish, and more distantly to the nautiloids.
