= Atsabites =

Atsabites Temporal range: Middle Permian

Scientific classification
- Domain: Eukaryota
- Kingdom: Animalia
- Phylum: Mollusca
- Class: Cephalopoda
- Subclass: †Ammonoidea
- Order: †Goniatitida
- Family: †Paragastrioceratidae
- Genus: †Atsabites; Haniel, 1915
- Species: †A. weberi

Binomial name
- †Atsabites weberi Haniel, 1915

Genus of molluscs (fossil)

Atsabites is an ammonoid cephalopod belonging to the family Paragastrioceratidae that lived during the Middle Permian between about 295 and 290 million years ago.

The shell of Atsabites is evolute, discoidal; whorls slightly impressed dorsally, with numerous prominent lateral ribs and fine longitudinal lirae.
