= Paragastrioceratinae =

- Paragastrioceras chengchouense, Shanghai Natural History Museum

Scientific classification
- Kingdom: Animalia
- Phylum: Mollusca
- Class: Cephalopoda
- Subclass: †Ammonoidea
- Order: †Goniatitida
- Family: †Paragastrioceratidae
- Subfamily: †Paragastrioceratinae; Ruzhencev 1951

Genera
- Baraioceras; Bulunites; Eotumaroceras; Epijuresanites; Paragastrioceras; Svetlanoceras; Synuraloceras; Tumaroceras; Uraloceras

Extinct subfamily of molluscs

Paragastrioceratinae is one of two subfamilies of the Paragastrioceratidae family. They are an extinct group of ammonoid, which are shelled cephalopods related to squids, belemnites, octopuses, and cuttlefish, and more distantly to the nautiloids.
