= Anatsabites =

Anatsabites Temporal range: Wordian

Scientific classification
- Kingdom: Animalia
- Phylum: Mollusca
- Class: Cephalopoda
- Subclass: †Ammonoidea
- Order: †Goniatitida
- Family: †Paragastrioceratidae
- Genus: †Anatsabites; Ruzhentsev, 1957
- Species: †A. multiliratus

Binomial name
- †Anatsabites multiliratus (Plummer & Scott 1937)

Genus of molluscs (fossil)

Anatsabites is a monospecific genus of ammonoid cephalopods belonging to the Paragastrioceratidae family. The only species is Anatsabites multiliratus (Plummer & Scott, 1937), formerly placed into genus Paraceltites. Its fossils were found in Wordian (Permian) of Texas.
