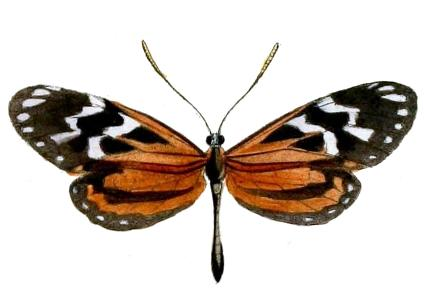

Scientific classification
- Domain: Eukaryota
- Kingdom: Animalia
- Phylum: Arthropoda
- Class: Insecta
- Order: Lepidoptera
- Family: Nymphalidae
- Genus: Hypothyris
- Species: H. lycaste

Binomial name
- Hypothyris lycaste (Fabricius, 1793)

Synonyms
- Papilio lycaste Fabricius, 1793; Dynothea lycaste; Ithomia (Ceratinia) cleis Bates, 1864; Ithomia megalopolis C. & R. Felder, [1865]; Ceratinia megalopolis; Hypothiris mergelana; Ithomia dionaea Hewitson, [1854]; Hypothyris dionaea kremkyi Bryk, 1937; Ceratinia dionaea; Ithomia (Ceratinia) callispila Bates, 1866; Ceratinia mylassa Druce, 1875; Ithomia callispila; Ceratinia callispila; Hypothiris antonia; Ceratinia limpida Haensch, 1905; Pseudomechanitis paradoxa Röber, 1930

= Hypothyris lycaste =

Species of butterfly

Hypothyris lycaste is a species of butterfly of the family Nymphalidae. It is found in Central and northern South America.

The larvae of ssp. callispila feed on Solanum torvum.

== Subspecies ==
- Hypothyris lycaste lycaste (Panama, Colombia)
- Hypothyris lycaste mergelena (Hewitson, [1855]) (Colombia)
- Hypothyris lycaste dionaea (Hewitson, [1854]) (Mexico, Guatemala)
- Hypothyris lycaste callispila (Bates, 1866) (Costa Rica, Panama)
- Hypothyris lycaste antonia (Hewitson, 1869) (Ecuador)
- Hypothyris lycaste glabra (Godman, 1899) (Colombia)
- Hypothyris lycaste limpida (Haensch, 1905) (Colombia)
- Hypothyris lycaste fraterna (Haensch, 1909) (Venezuela)
- Hypothyris lycaste limosa Fox, 1971 (Colombia)

In addition, there is one unnamed subspecies from Panama.
