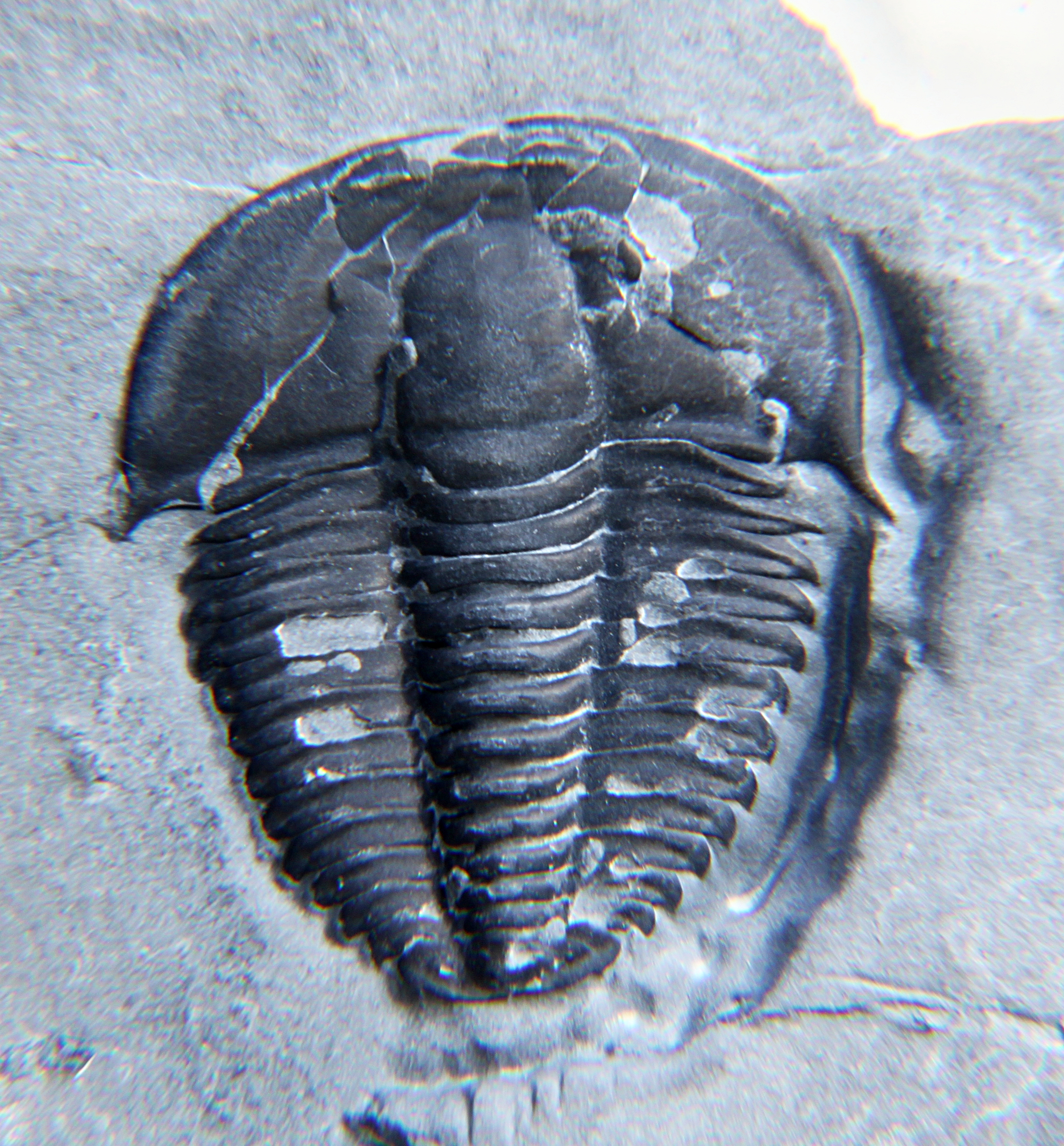
- Kendallina crassitesta, 18 mm

Scientific classification
- Kingdom: Animalia
- Phylum: Arthropoda
- Clade: †Artiopoda
- Class: †Trilobita
- Order: †Asaphida
- Family: †Parabolinoididae
- Genus: †Kendallina; Berg, 1953

Species
- K. eryon (Hall, 1863) (type) = Conocephalites eryon; K. biforota Berg, 1953; K. crassitesta Westrop, 1963

Synonyms
- Kendallia Berg, 1953, non Evermann & Shaw, 1927 (jr. synonym of Hemiculter, a carp)

= Kendallina =

Kendallina Temporal range: Upper Cambrian, 492.5–488.3 Ma

Genus of trilobites

Kendallina is a genus of parabolinoidid trilobite with an inverted egg-shaped outline, a wide headshield, small eyes, small deflected spines, 12 thorax segments and a small, short tailshield. It lived during the Late Cambrian in what are today Canada and the United States.

== Description ==
The outline of the exoskeleton Kendallina is inverted egg-shaped, with a wide rectangular headshield (or cephalon) about twice as wide as long. The well-defined central raised area (or glabella), excluding the backward occipital ring, is almost as wide as long, moderately convex, truncate-tapering, with 3 pairs of shallow to obsolete lateral furrows. The occipital ring is well defined. The distance between the glabella and the border (or preglabellar field) is ±1/4× as long as the glabella. Kendallina has small eyes, 1/8× as long as the cephalon, which are positioned near the front of the glabella and about half as far out as the glabella is wide. The remaining parts of the cephalon, called fixed and free cheeks (or fixigenae and librigenae) are flat. The fracture lines (or sutures) that in moulting separate the librigenae from the fixigenae are divergent just in front of the eyes, becoming parallel near the border furrow and strongly convergent at the margin. From the back of the eyes the sutures are straight, diverging outward and backward at approximately 45°, cutting the posterior margin well within the inner bend of the spine (or opisthoparian sutures). The articulating middle part of the body (or thorax) has 12 segments. The anteriormost segment gradually narrows into a sideward directed point, while further to the back the segments are rounded with a short, outward deflected spine at back of their outer tips. The small tailshield (or pygidium) is about 1/3× as wide as the cephalon, narrowly transverse about 3× wider than long. Its axis is about the same width as pleural fields to each side, and has up to 3 axial rings and a terminal and almost reaches the margin. Up to 4 pleural segments with obsolete interpleural grooves and shallow pleural furrows. The posterior margin is smooth or has one pair of minute spines. The surface has fine granules or is smooth.

== Taxonomy ==
Kendallina was originally named Kendallia Berg, 1953, but this name was already occupied since Evermann and Shaw bestowed it on a carp in 1927. The replacement name was proposed in the Treatise on Invertebrate Paleontology by Christina Lochman-Balk that same year. Since then, Kendallia Evermann & Shaw, 1927 has been recognized as the junior synonym of Hemiculter.

== Distribution ==
- K. biforota is present in the Upper Cambrian of the United States (Franconian, Conaspis zone, Davis Formation, Elvins Group, Washington County, Missouri, 37.9° N, 90.7° W).
- K. crassitesta has been found in the Upper Cambrian of Canada (Sunwaptan, Parabolinoides subzone and Taenicephalus shumardi subzone, Bison Creek Formation, Alberta, 51.5° N, 116.2° W).
- K. eryon has been identified from the Upper Cambrian of the United States (Clear Creek Section, Open Door Formation, Sublette County, Wyoming, 43.3° N, 109.8° W).
