= Prototreta flabellata =

Prototreta flabellata Temporal range: Middle Cambrian, 540–490 Ma

Scientific classification
- Kingdom: Animalia
- Phylum: Brachiopoda
- Class: Lingulata
- Order: †Acrotretida
- Family: †Acrotretidae
- Genus: †Prototreta
- Species: †P. flabellata

Binomial name
- †Prototreta flabellata

Species of marine lamp shell

Prototreta flabellata is one of several species of brachiopod that occur in the Cambrian rocks of central and southern Montana, Nixon Gulch section, Three Forks Quad. It is associated with the trilobite genus Ehmania near the base of the Middle Cambrian Meagher limestone.
