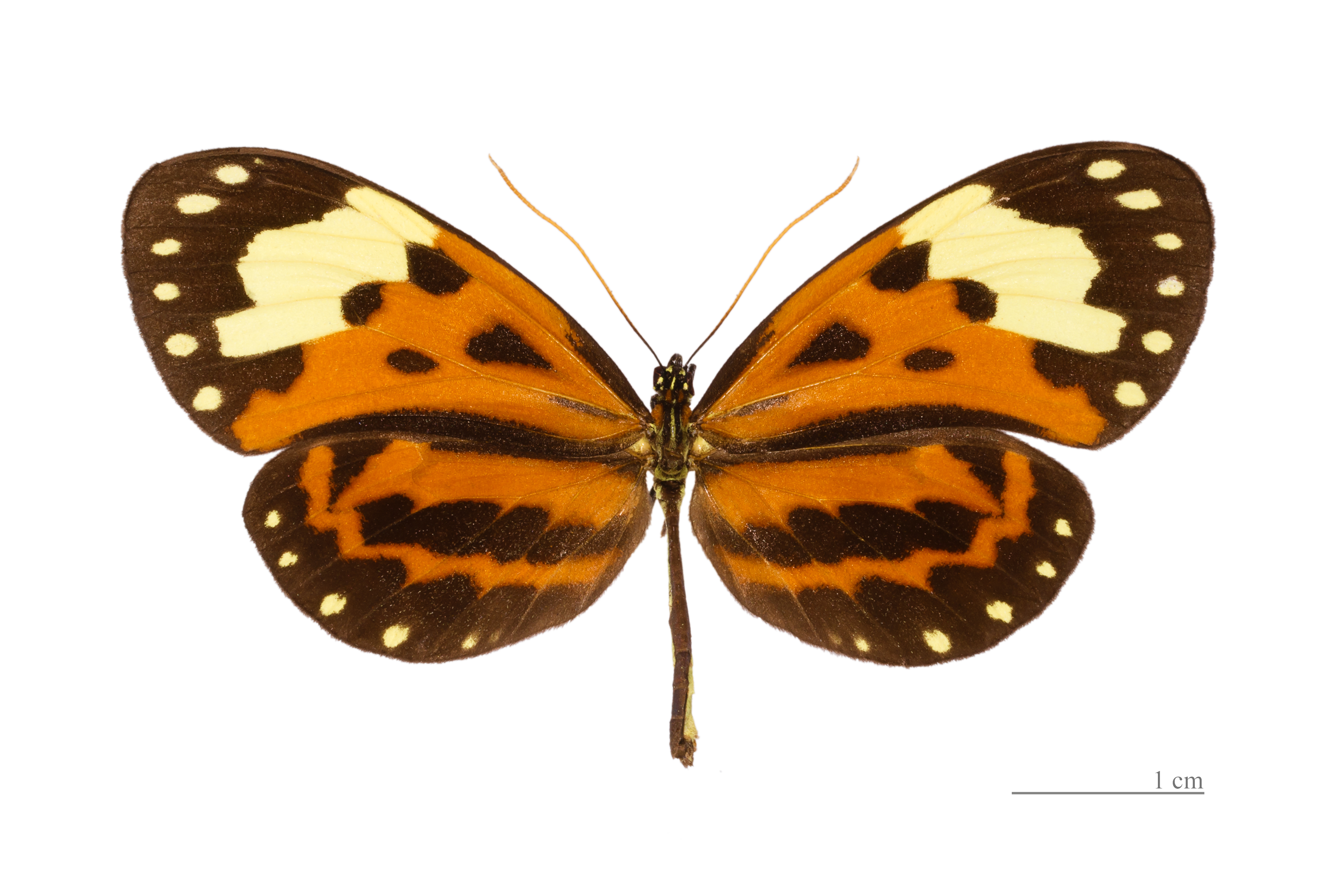
- Hypothyris ninonia - MHNT

Scientific classification
- Domain: Eukaryota
- Kingdom: Animalia
- Phylum: Arthropoda
- Class: Insecta
- Order: Lepidoptera
- Family: Nymphalidae
- Tribe: Ithomiini
- Genus: Hypothyris; Hübner, 1821

Type species
- Nereis ninonia Hübner, [1806]

Species
- See text

Synonyms
- Dynothea Reakirt, [1866]; Mansueta d'Almeida, 1922; Pseudomechanitis Röber, 1930; Garsauritis d'Almeida, 1938; Rhodussa d'Almeida, 1939

= Hypothyris =

Genus of brush-footed butterflies

Hypothyris is a genus of clearwing (ithomiine) butterflies, named by Jacob Hübner in 1821. They are in the brush-footed butterfly family, Nymphalidae.

== Species ==
Arranged alphabetically within species groups:

- Unknown species group
  - Hypothyris anastasia (Bates, 1862)
  - Hypothyris connexa (Hall, 1939)
  - Hypothyris coeno (Doubleday, 1847)
  - Hypothyris daphnis d'Almeida, 1945
  - Hypothyris euclea (Godart, 1819) – common ticlear
  - Hypothyris fluonia (Hewitson, 1854)
  - Hypothyris gemella Fox, 1971
  - Hypothyris leprieuri (Feisthamel, 1835)
  - Hypothyris lycaste (Fabricius, 1793) – round-spotted ticlear
  - Hypothyris mamercus (Hewitson, 1869)
  - Hypothyris mansuetus (Hewitson, 1860)
  - Hypothyris moebiusi (Haensch, 1903)
  - Hypothyris ninonia (Hübner, [1806])
  - Hypothyris semifulva (Salvin, 1869)
  - Hypothyris thea (Hewitson, 1852)
  - Hypothyris vallonia (Hewitson, [1853])
- The Garsauritis species group
  - Hypothyris xanthostola (Bates, 1862)
- The Rhodussa species group
  - Hypothyris cantobrica (Hewitson, 1876)
