= Pseudogastrioceratinae =

Scientific classification
- Kingdom: Animalia
- Phylum: Mollusca
- Class: Cephalopoda
- Subclass: †Ammonoidea
- Order: †Goniatitida
- Family: †Paragastrioceratidae
- Subfamily: †Pseudogastrioceratinae; Furnish 1966

Genera
- Altudoceras; Chekiangoceras; Daubichites; Metagastrioceras; Pseudogastrioceras; Retiogastrioceras; Roadoceras; Stenolobulites; Stenolobulites

Extinct subfamily of molluscs

Pseudogastrioceratinae is one of two subfamilies of the Paragastrioceratidae family. They are an extinct group of ammonoid, which are shelled cephalopods related to squids, belemnites, octopuses, and cuttlefish, and more distantly to the nautiloids.
