= Paragastrioceratidae =

- Paragastrioceras chengchouense, Shanghai Natural History Museum

Scientific classification
- Kingdom: Animalia
- Phylum: Mollusca
- Class: Cephalopoda
- Subclass: †Ammonoidea
- Order: †Goniatitida
- Superfamily: †Neoicoceratoidea
- Family: †Paragastrioceratidae; Ruzhencev 1951

Subfamilies
- Atsabitinae; Paragastrioceratinae; Pseudogastrioceratinae

Extinct family of molluscs

Paragastrioceratidae is one of ten families of the Neoicoceratoidea superfamily. They are an extinct group of ammonoid, which are shelled cephalopods related to squids, belemnites, octopuses, and cuttlefish, and more distantly to the nautiloids.
