= List of the Paleozoic life of Colorado =

This list of the Paleozoic life of Colorado contains the various prehistoric life-forms whose fossilized remains have been reported from within the US state of Colorado and are between 538.8 and 252.17 million years of age.

== A ==
- †Acanthatia
  - †Acanthatia nupera
- †Acondylacanthus
  - †Acondylacanthus nuperus
- †Actinoceras
- †Adiantites
  - †Adiantites rockymontanus – type locality for species
- †Aglaocrinus
  - †Aglaocrinus magnus
- †Allumettoceras
- †Amorphognathus
  - †Amorphognathus ramosa
- †Amplexizaphrentis
  - †Amplexizaphrentis pamatus
- †Amplexus
- †Anthracoblattina
  - †Anthracoblattina triassica – type locality for species
- †Anthracospirifer
  - †Anthracospirifer tanoensis
- †Antiquatonia
  - †Antiquatonia coloradoensis
- †Araucarites
- †Archaeocidaris
  - †Archaeocidaris cratis
  - †Archaeocidaris ourayensis
  - †Archaeocidaris triplex
- †Asterophyllites
  - †Asterophyllites charaeformis
  - †Asterophyllites longifolius – tentative report
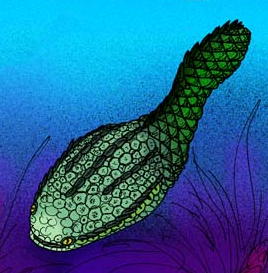
- Life restoration of the Middle-Late Ordovician jawless fish Astraspis
  †Astraspis – type locality for genus
  - †Astraspis desiderata – type locality for species
- †Athyris
  - †Athyris coloradensis
  - †Athyris transversa
- †Aviculopecten

== B ==
- †Beloitoceras
  - †Beloitoceras accultum
- †Blothrocrinus
- †Bucanella
- †Bythiacanthus

== C ==
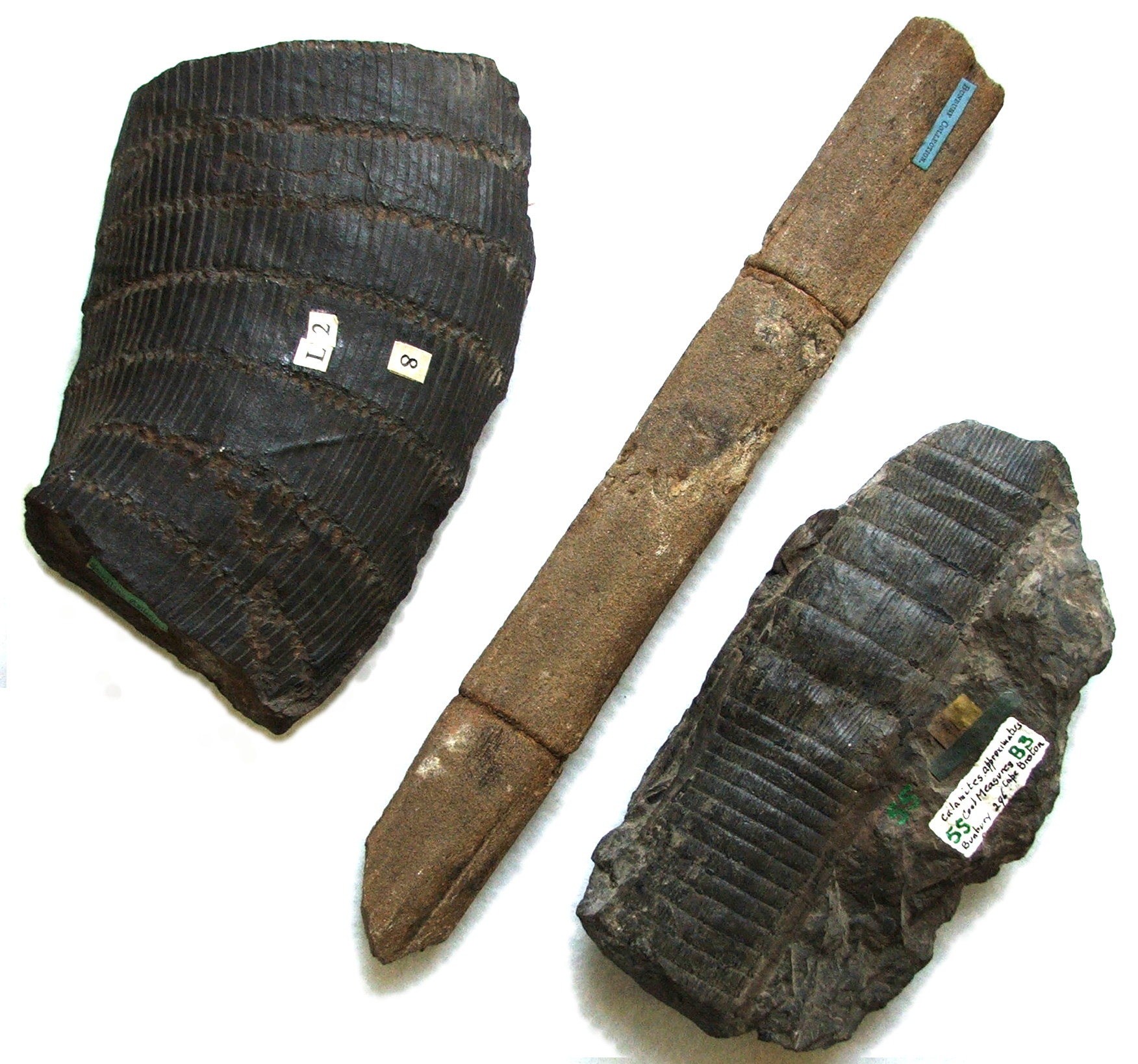
- Fossilized stems from the Carboniferous-Permian horsetail relative Calamites
  †Calamites
  - †Calamites cistii
  - †Calamites cruciatus
  - †Calamites distachyus
  - †Calamites gigas
  - †Calamites kutorgae – tentative report
- †Calapoecia
- †Callipteris
  - †Callipteris lyratifolia – or unidentified comparable form
- †Camarotoechia
- †Caninia
- †Catactocrinus – tentative report
  - †Catactocrinus torus
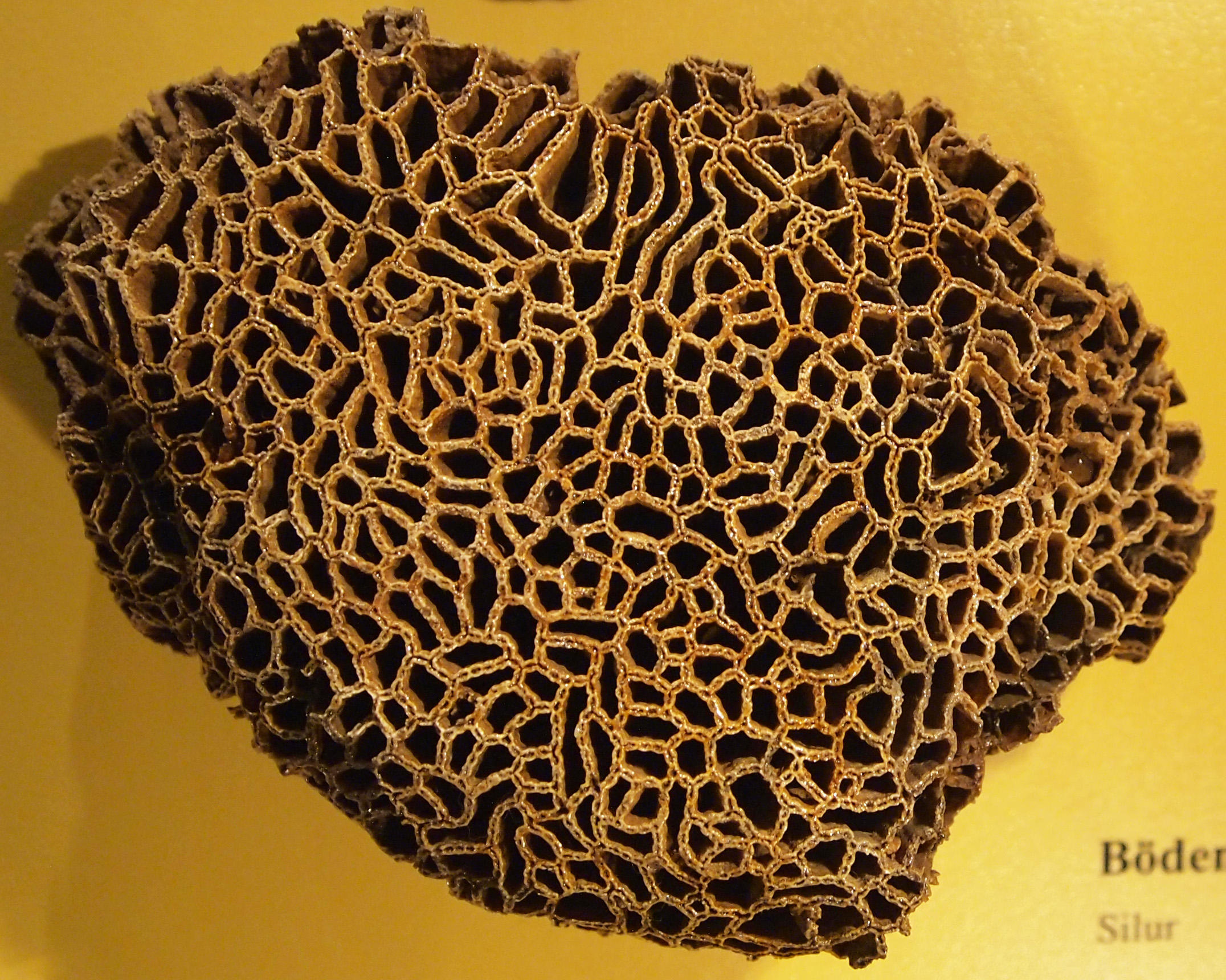
- Fossil of the Ordovician-Silurian tabulate coral Catenipora
  †Catenipora
  - †Catenipora robusta – or unidentified comparable form
- †Ceraurinus
  - †Ceraurinus icarus
- †Cercopyllis
  - †Cercopyllis adolescens – type locality for species
  - †Cercopyllis delicatula – type locality for species
  - †Cercopyllis justiciae – type locality for species
- †Charactoceras – tentative report
- †Chirognathus
  - †Chirognathus admiranda
  - †Chirognathus aequidentata
  - †Chirognathus alternata
  - †Chirognathus deformis
  - †Chirognathus delicatula
  - †Chirognathus dubia
  - †Chirognathus duodactyla
  - †Chirognathus duodactylus
  - †Chirognathus eucharis
  - †Chirognathus gradata
  - †Chirognathus idonea
  - †Chirognathus maniformis
  - †Chirognathus monodactyla
  - †Chirognathus multidens
  - †Chirognathus parallela
  - †Chirognathus plana
  - †Chirognathus tenuidentata
  - †Chirognathus unguliformis
  - †Chirognathus vulgaris
- †Coelosporella
- †Coleolus
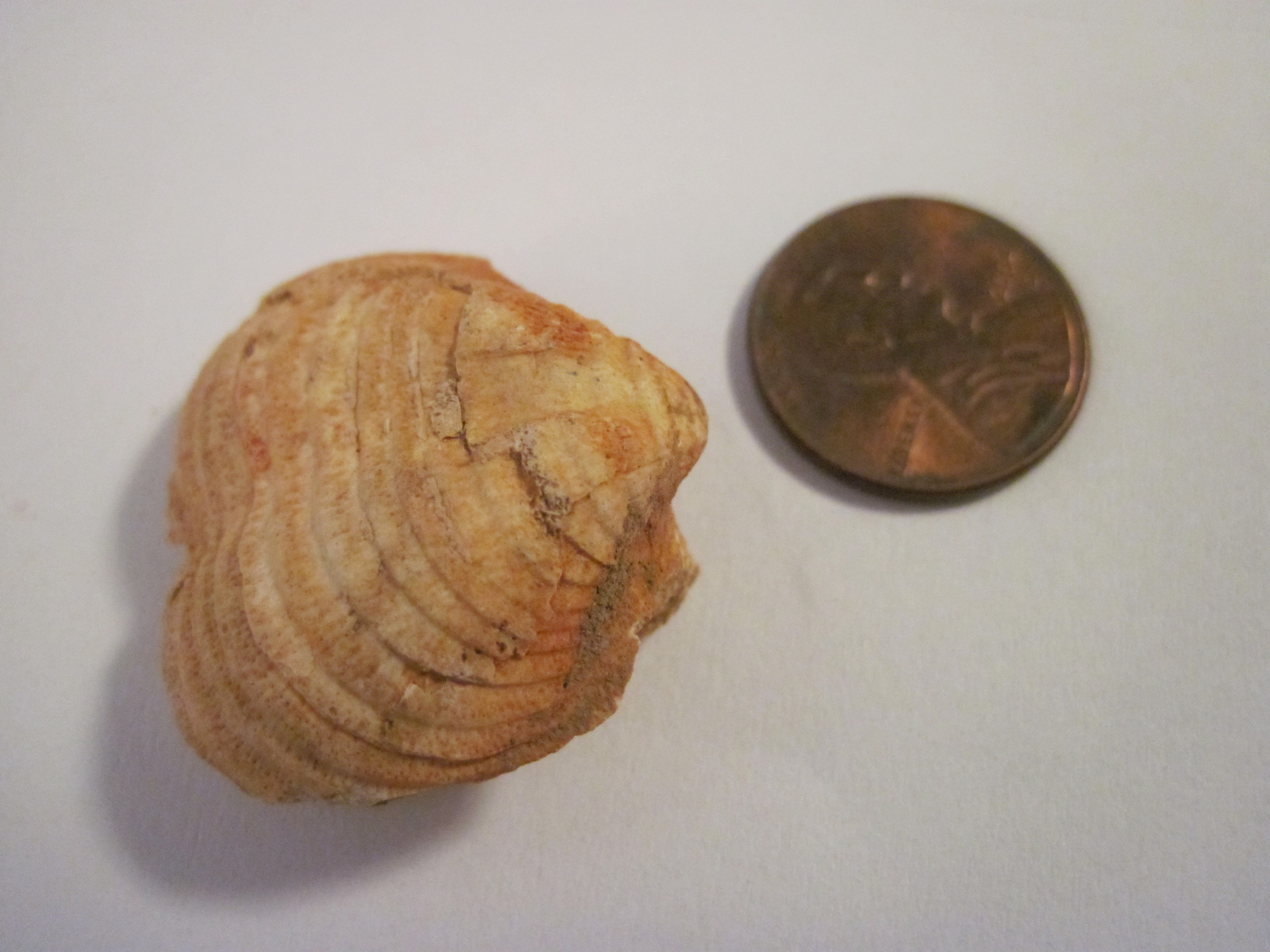
- Fossilized shell of the Late Devonian-Permian brachiopod Composita
  †Composita
  - †Composita gibbosa
  - †Composita ovata
- †Conocardium
- †Cordaianthus
- †Cordaicarpon
- †Cordaites
  - †Cordaites angulosostriatus
- †Cornulites
- †Cranaena
  - †Cranaena subelliptica
- †Crania
- †Ctenacanthus
  - †Ctenacanthus buttersi
  - †Ctenacanthus furcicarinatus
- †Ctenodonta
- †Cupressocrinites
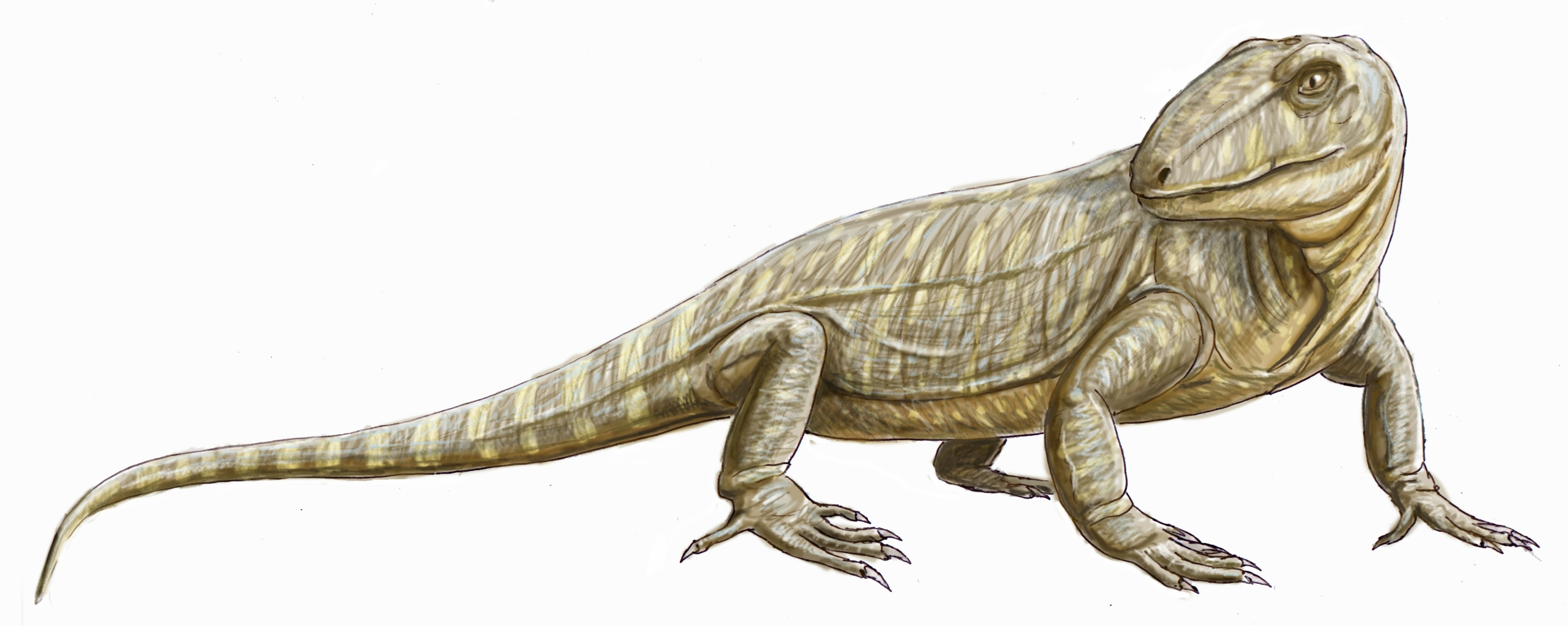
- Restoration of the Permian synapsid (mammal precursor) Cutleria
  †Cutleria – type locality for genus
  - †Cutleria wilmarthi – type locality for species
- †Cyclopteris
- †Cyrtiopsis
  - †Cyrtiopsis animasensis
  - †Cyrtiopsis conicula
  - †Cyrtiopsis kindlei
- †Cyrtodonta
- †Cyrtogomphoceras
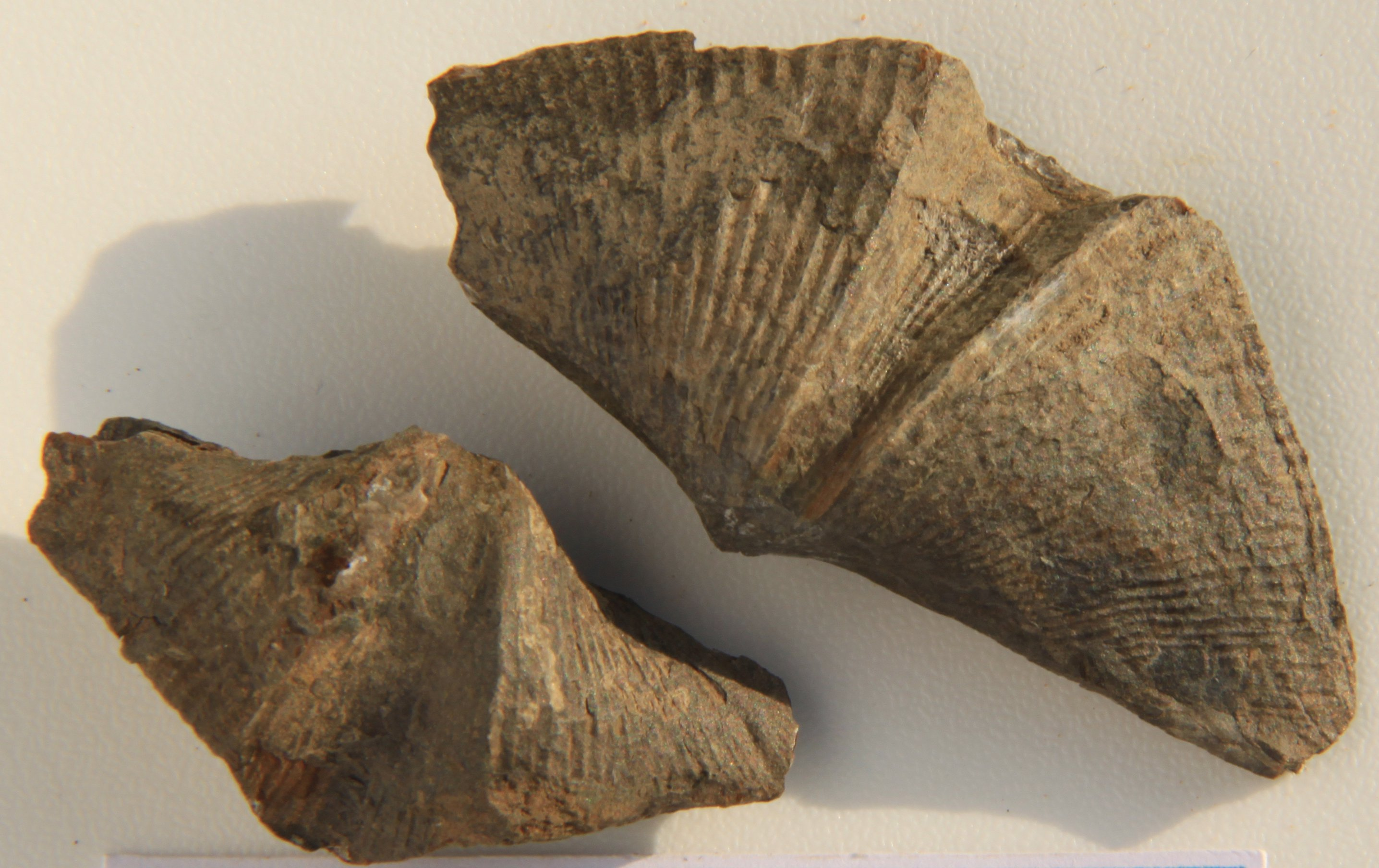
- Fossilized shells of the Middle-Late Devonian brachiopod Cyrtospirifer
  †Cyrtospirifer
  - †Cyrtospirifer animasensis
  - †Cyrtospirifer whitneyi

== D ==
- †Dactylophyllum – type locality for genus
  - †Dactylophyllum johnsoni – type locality for species
- †Desmoinesia
  - †Desmoinesia nambeensis
- †Dicladoblatta
  - †Dicladoblatta marginata – type locality for species
- †Dicromyocrinus
  - †Dicromyocrinus beldenensis
- †Dictyoclostus
- †Dictyorhabdus
  - †Dictyorhabdus priscus
- †Diestoceras
- †Diplothmema
  - †Diplothmema patentissima
- †Distatoblatta
  - †Distatoblatta persistens – type locality for species

== E ==
- †Echinosphaerites – tentative report
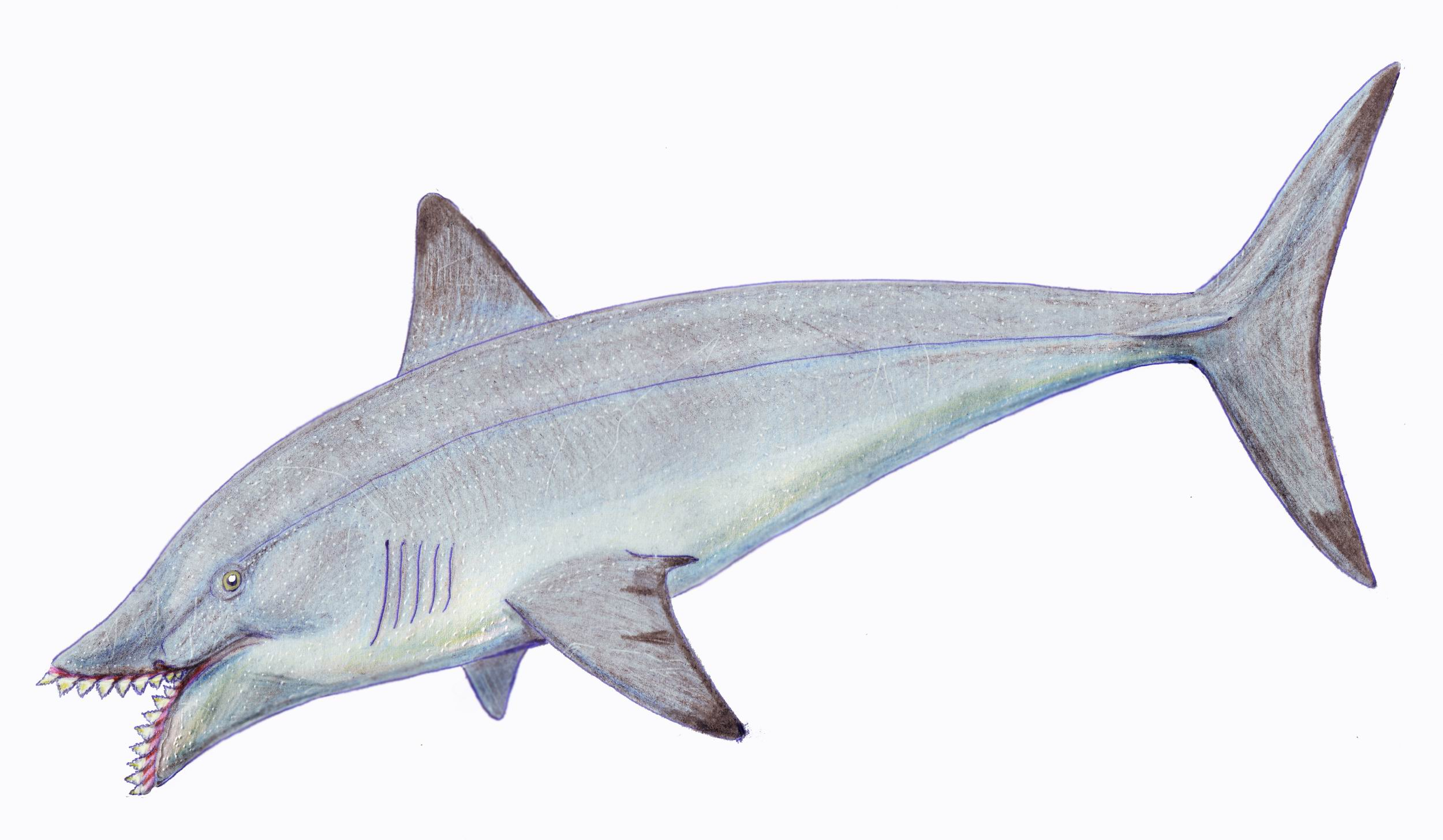
- Life restoration of the Late Devonian-Carboniferous Chimaera relative Edestus
  †Edestus
  - †Edestus minor
- †Eireocrinus – tentative report
  - †Eireocrinus coloradoensis
- †Endoceras
- †Epheboblatta
  - †Epheboblatta attenuata – type locality for species
- †Ephippiorthoceras
- †Eretmocrinus
  - †Eretmocrinus sawdoi – type locality for species
- †Eriptychius – type locality for genus
  - †Eriptychius americanus – type locality for species
- †Erismodus
  - †Erismodus quadridactylus
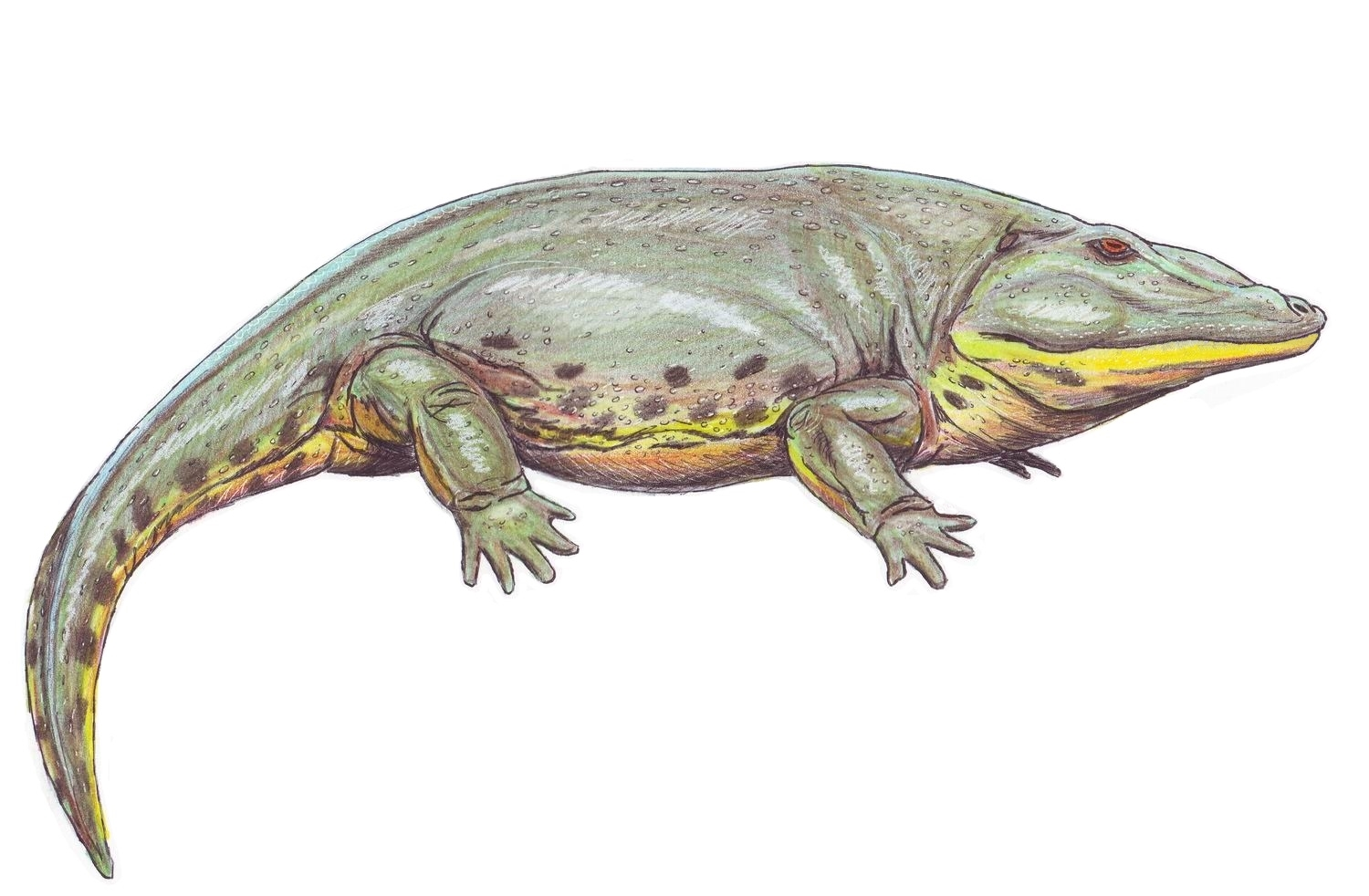
- Life restoration of the Carboniferous-Permian amphibian Eryops
  †Eryops
  - †Eryops grandis – or unidentified comparable form
- †Etoblattina
- †Eumetria – tentative report
- †Euomphalus
  - †Euomphalus eurekensis – or unidentified comparable form
- †Eusphenopteris

== F ==
- †Floweria
  - †Floweria chemungensis
- †Floyda
  - †Floyda concentrica

== G ==
- †Garwoodia
  - †Garwoodia media
- †Gilmocrinus – tentative report
  - †Gilmocrinus albus
- †Girvanella
  - †Girvanella nicholsoni
- †Glossites
- †Goleocrinus – tentative report
- †Gomphostrobus
  - †Gomphostrobus bifidus

== H ==
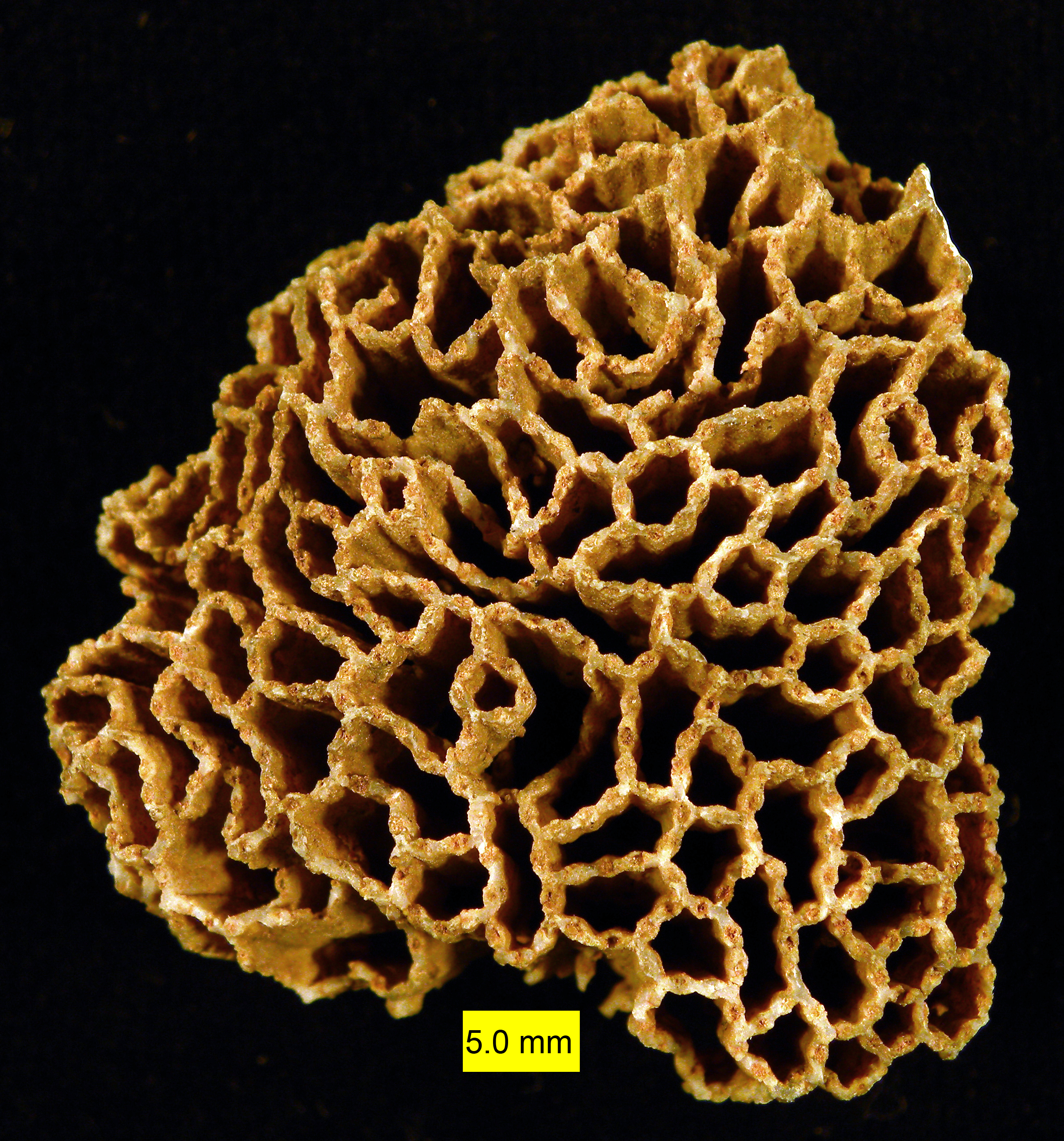
- Fossil of the Ordovician-Silurian tabulate coral Halysites
  †Halysites
  - †Halysites delicatulus – or unidentified comparable form
- †Hebertella
  - †Hebertella sinuaia
- †Helicelasma
  - †Helicelasma rusticum – or unidentified comparable form
- †Helicotoma
- †Hiscobeccus
  - †Hiscobeccus capax
- †Hudsonaster
- †Hypselocrinus – tentative report
  - †Hypselocrinus bisonensis

== I ==
- †Isalaux – type locality for genus
  - †Isalaux canyonensis – type locality for species
- †Isonema
  - †Isonema depressum
  - †Isonema humlis

== K ==
- †Kionoceras

== L ==
- †Lambeoceras
- †Laminatia – tentative report
  - †Laminatia laminata
- †Lecrosia
  - †Lecrosia gouldii
- †Leioproductus
  - †Leioproductus coloradensis
  - †Leioproductus coloradoensis
  - †Leioproductus varispinosus
- †Leperditia
- †Lepidocyclus
  - †Lepidocyclus rectangularis – or unidentified comparable form
- †Lepidodendron
  - †Lepidodendron johnsonii – type locality for species
- †Lepidophloios
  - †Lepidophloios laricinus
- †Lepidophylloides
- †Lepidostrobophyllum
- †Lepidostrobus
  - †Lepidostrobus weberensis – type locality for species
- †Leptaena
- †Leptodesma
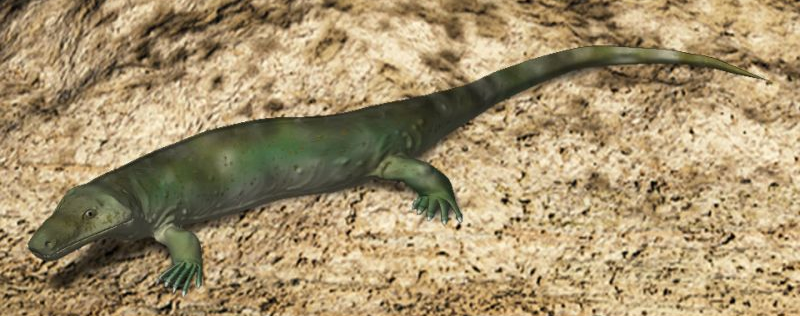
- Life restoration of the Permian reptile precursor Limnoscelis
  †Limnoscelis
  - †Limnoscelis dynatis – type locality for species
- †Limnoscelops – type locality for genus
  - †Limnoscelops longifemur – type locality for species
- †Lingula
  - †Lingula huronensis
- †Linoproductus
  - †Linoproductus nodosus
- †Liospira
- †Lophospira
  - †Lophospira perangulata
- †Loxonema

== M ==
- †Macluritella
  - †Macluritella stantoni
- †Macrostachya – tentative report
- †Mariopteris
  - †Mariopteris pygmaea – or unidentified comparable form
- †Meekospira
- †Meristella
- †Modiolopsis
- †Mooreoceras
- †Mytilarca

== N ==
- †Nearoblatta
  - †Nearoblatta rotundata – type locality for species
- †Neochonetes
  - †Neochonetes whitei – or unidentified comparable form
- †Neorthroblattina
  - †Neorthroblattina albolineata – type locality for species
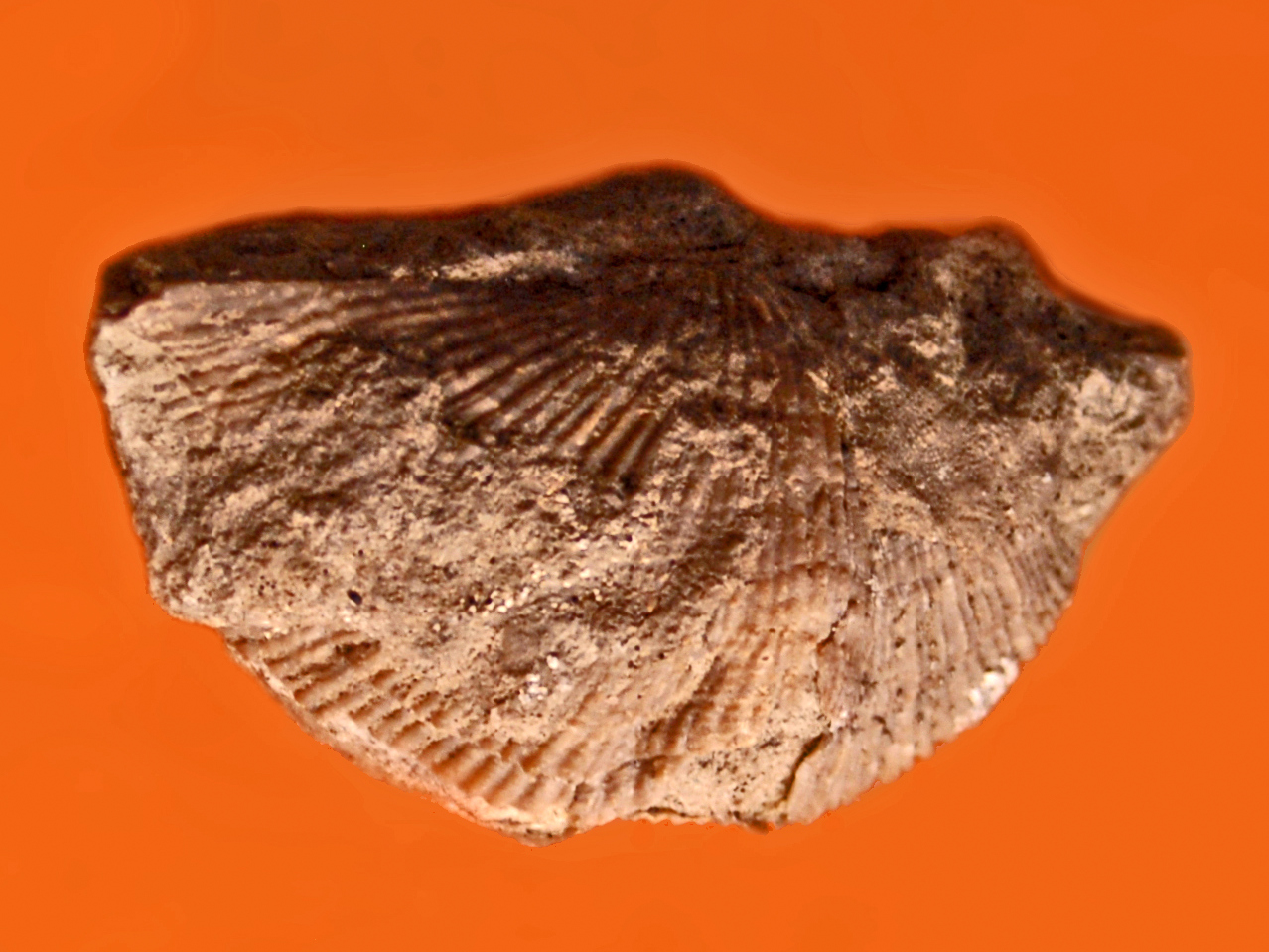
- Fossilized shell of the Carboniferous-Permian brachiopod Neospirifer
  †Neospirifer
  - †Neospirifer goreii
- †Neumatoceras
- †Neuralethopteris
- †Neuropteris
  - †Neuropteris auriculata
  - †Neuropteris dluhoschi
  - †Neuropteris gigantea – tentative report
  - †Neuropteris heterophylla

== O ==
- †Odontopteris
  - †Odontopteris mccoyensis
  - †Odontopteris subcrenulata
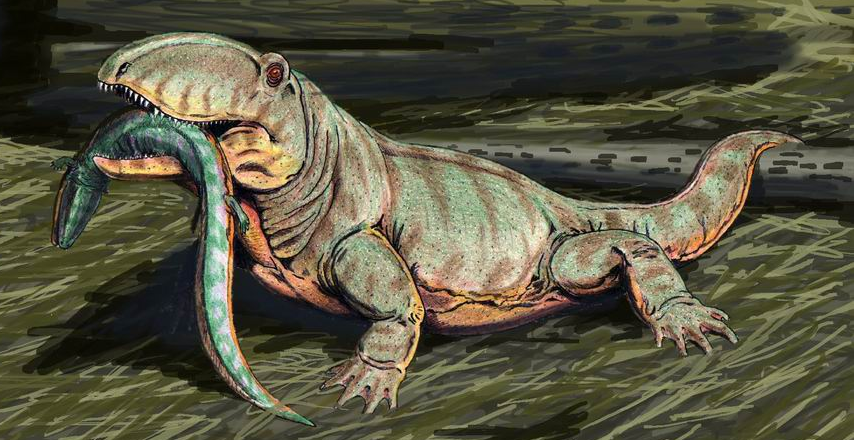
- Life restoration of the Carboniferous-Permian synapsid (mammal precursor) Ophiacodon
  †Ophiacodon
- †Ophiopolytretus
  - †Ophiopolytretus aethus
- †Oradectes
  - †Oradectes sanmiguelensis – type locality for species
- †Ormoceras
  - †Ormoceras pollacki
- †Orthoceras
- †Orthodesma
- †Orthonota
- †Orthotetes
  - †Orthotetes inequalis
- †Ortonella
  - †Ortonella kershopensis
- †Oulodus
  - †Oulodus serratus

== P ==
- †Pachystrophia
  - †Pachystrophia contiguus
- †Paladin – tentative report
- †Palaeoglossa
  - †Palaeoglossa hurlbuti
- †Parachaetetes
  - †Parachaetetes glenwoodensis
- †Paurorhyncha
  - †Paurorhyncha cooperi – or unidentified comparable form
  - †Paurorhyncha endlichi
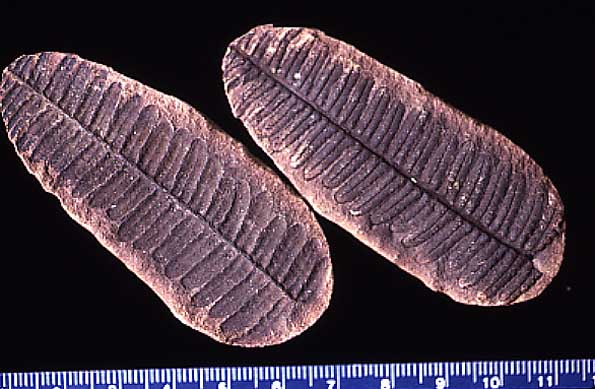
- Fossils of the Late Devonian-Permian fern-like fronds Pecopteris
  †Pecopteris
  - †Pecopteris arborescens
  - †Pecopteris pinnatifida
- †Pentaricida
  - †Pentaricida pentagonalis
- †Pentaridica
  - †Pentaridica pentagonalis
- †Petrablattina
  - †Petrablattina aequa – type locality for species
- †Petrodus
  - †Petrodus patelliformis
- †Phyloblatta
  - †Phyloblatta meieri – type locality for species
- †Physonemus
- †Plaesiomys
  - †Plaesiomys bellilamellosus
  - †Plaesiomys proavitus
- †Planoproductus
  - †Planoproductus depressus
  - †Planoproductus hillsboroensis – or unidentified comparable form
  - †Planoproductus hillsbororensis – or unidentified comparable form
- †Platyceras
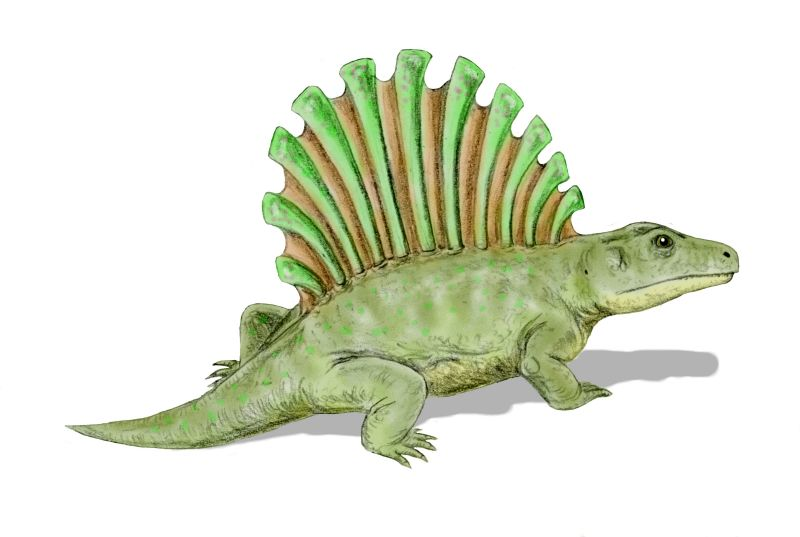
- Life restoration of the Carboniferous-Permian sail-backed amphibian Platyhystrix
  †Platyhystrix
  - †Platyhystrix rugosus
- †Pleiadeaster
  - †Pleiadeaster inceptus
- †Poroblattina
  - †Poroblattina arcuata – type locality for species
  - †Poroblattina lakesii – type locality for species
  - †Poroblattina parvula – type locality for species
- †Porostictia
  - †Porostictia perchaensis
- †Probillingsites
  - †Probillingsites kessleri
- †Productella
- †Protocycloceras
  - †Protocycloceras manitouense
- †Pseudochaetes
  - †Pseudochaetes similis
- †Psygmophyllum
  - †Psygmophyllum cuneifolium – or unidentified comparable form
- †Ptiloporella
- †Ptychomalotoechia
  - †Ptychomalotoechia sobrina
- †Pugnax
- †Pugnoides
- †Punctospirifer
  - †Punctospirifer solidirostris

== R ==
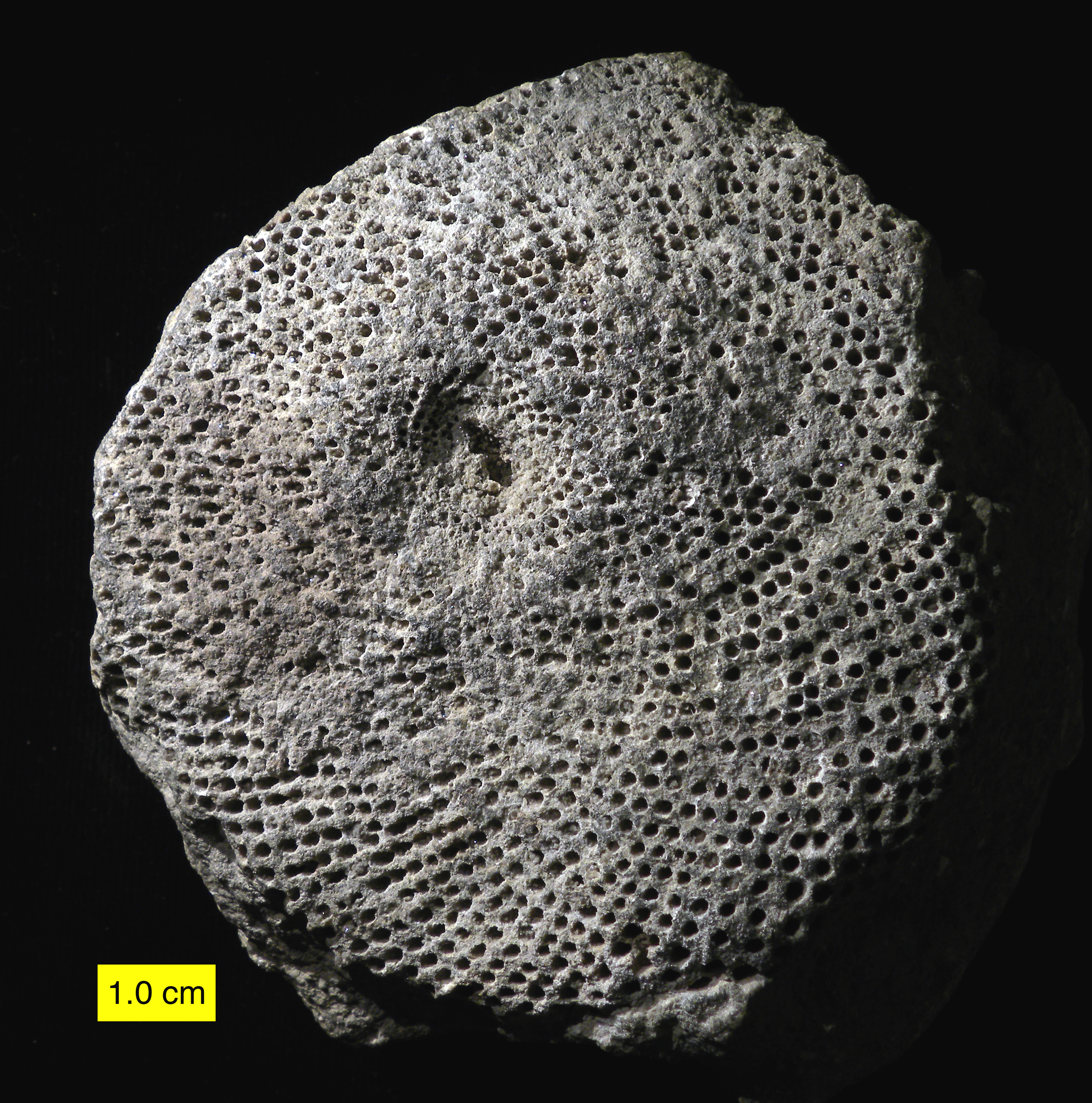
- Fossil of the Early Ordovician-Permian benthic alga Receptaculites
  †Receptaculites
  - †Receptaculites articus – or unidentified comparable form
- †Reticularia
- †Rhabdocarpus
  - †Rhabdocarpus dyadicus
- †Rhombopora
- †Rhynchospirina
  - †Rhynchospirina scansa – or unidentified related form
- †Rhynchotrema
  - †Rhynchotrema argenturbicum
- †Robsonoceras
  - †Robsonoceras manitouense

== S ==
- †Saffordophyllum
  - †Saffordophyllum franklini
- †Samaropsis
  - †Samaropsis hesperius
- †Sandia
  - †Sandia welleri
- †Schizodus
  - †Schizodus acuminatus
- †Schizophoria
  - †Schizophoria austalis
  - †Schizophoria australis
- †Schuchertella
  - †Schuchertella coloradoensis
- †Scolecopteris
  - †Scolecopteris elegans
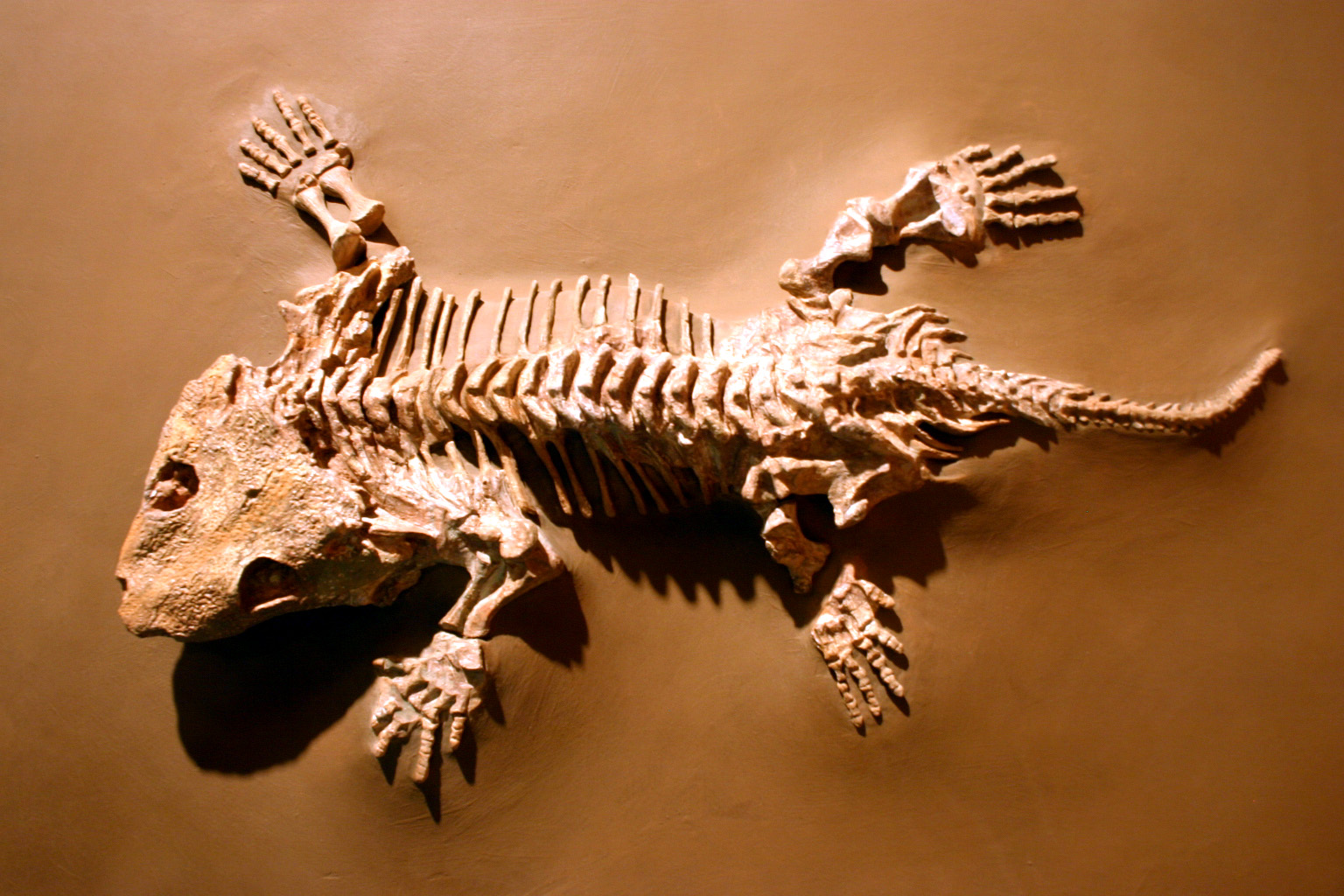
- Fossilized skeleton of the Permian primitive four-limbed animal Seymouria
  †Seymouria
- †Sigillaria
  - †Sigillaria elegans – or unidentified comparable form
  - †Sigillaria ovata
- †Sigillariostrobus
  - †Sigillariostrobus hastatus
- †Sphenophyllum
  - †Sphenophyllum obovatum
- †Sphenopteris
  - †Sphenopteris asplenioides
  - †Sphenopteris cheathami
  - †Sphenopteris microcarpa – or unidentified comparable form
  - †Sphenopteris schimperiana – tentative report
- †Spiloblattina
  - †Spiloblattina weissigensis – type locality for species
- †Spiloblattinidae
  - †Spiloblattinidae gardinerana – type locality for species
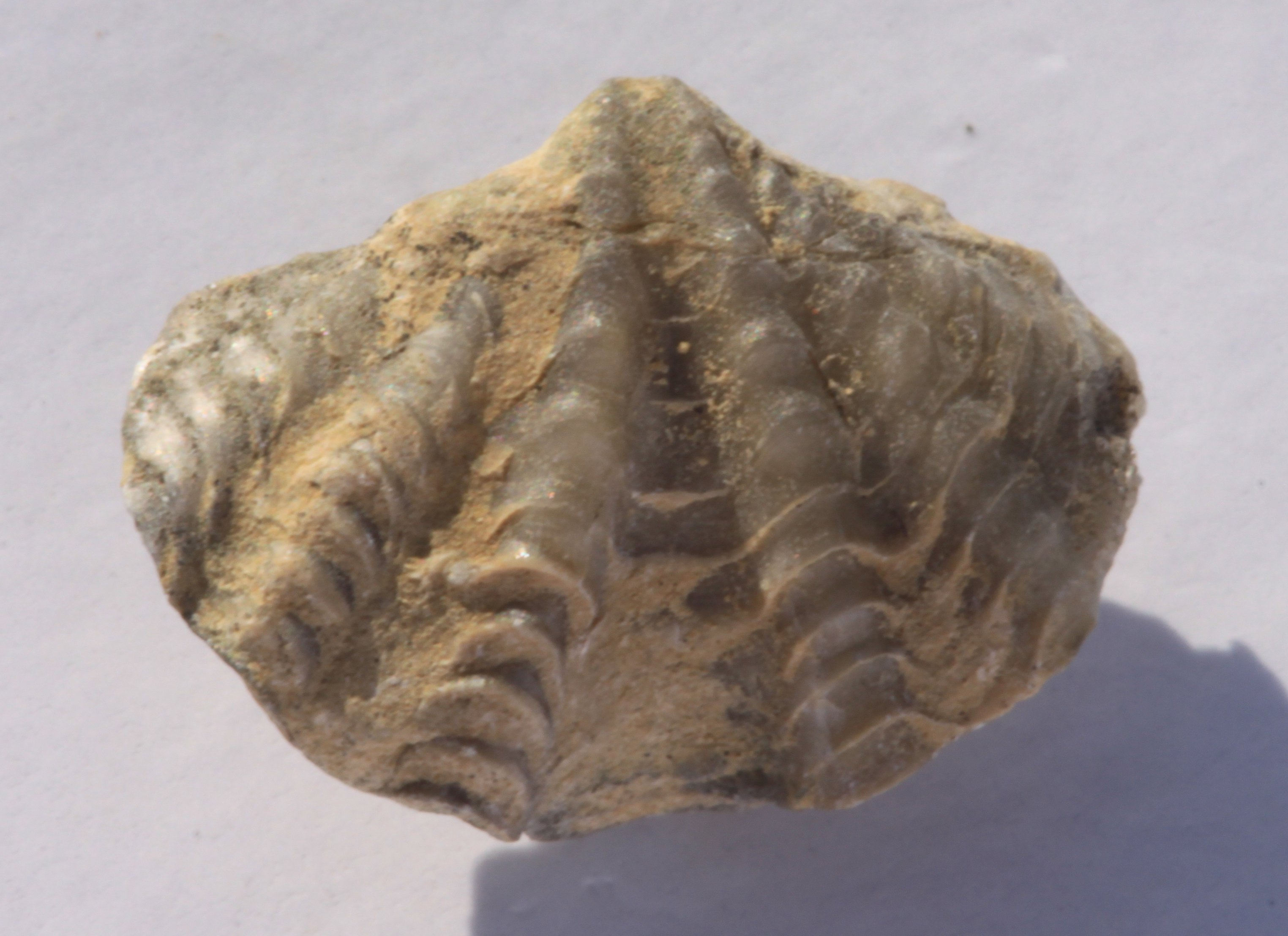
- Fossilized shell of the Late Ordovician-Late Triassic brachiopod Spirifer
  †Spirifer
  - †Spirifer centronatus
- Spirorbis
- †Spyroceras
- †Stereoconus
  - †Stereoconus gracilis
- †Stigmaria
  - †Stigmaria ficoides
  - †Stigmaria verrucosa
- †Straparollus
  - †Straparollus clymenioides – or unidentified comparable form
- †Streblopteria
- †Strepsodiscus – type locality for genus
  - †Strepsodiscus major – type locality for species
- †Streptelasma
- †Strimplecrinus
  - †Strimplecrinus dyerensis
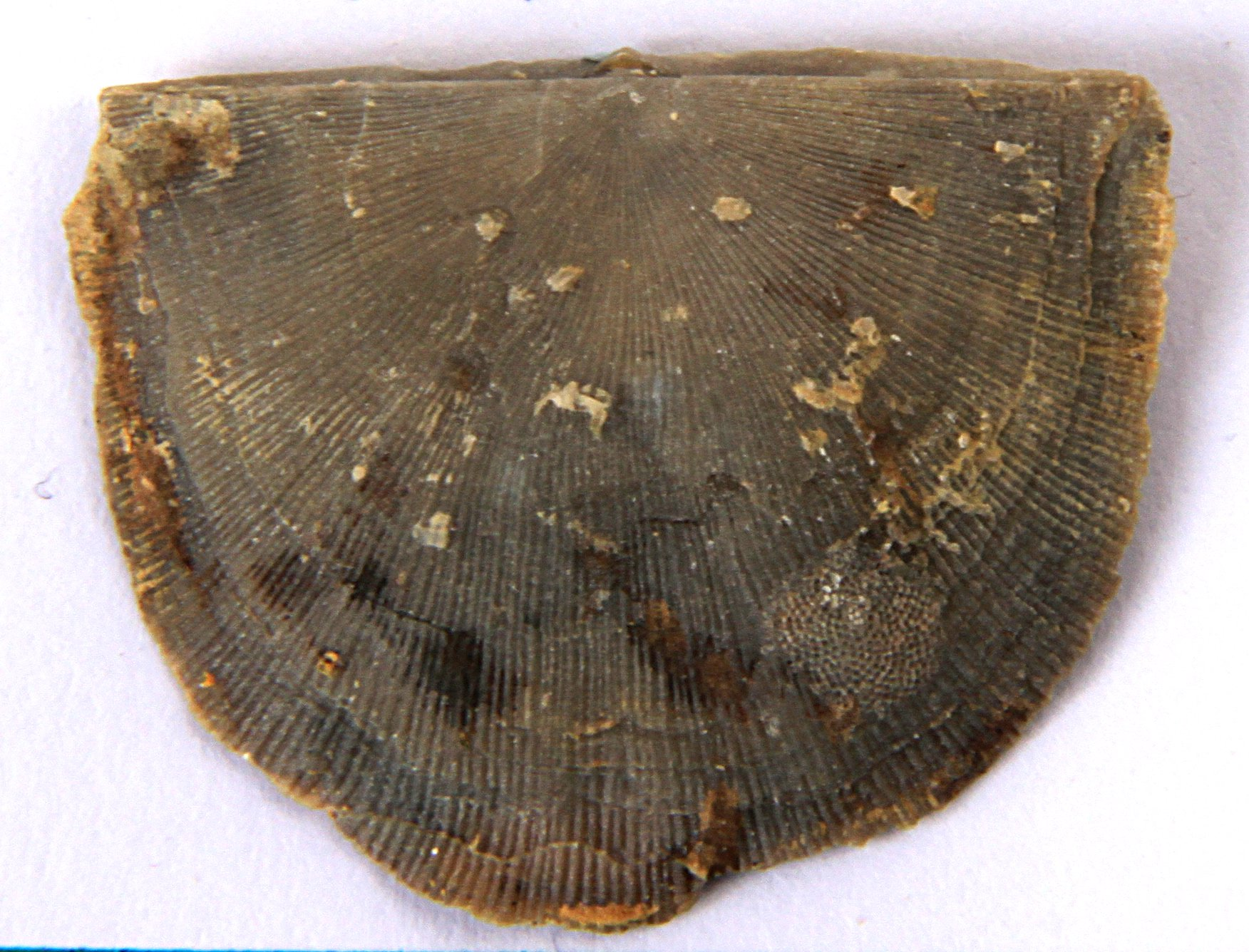
- Fossilized shell of the Ordovician-Silurian brachiopod Strophomena
  †Strophomena
- †Strophopleura
  - †Strophopleura notabilis
- †Synarmocrinus
  - †Synarmocrinus cobbani
- †Syringodendron
- †Syringopora
  - †Syringopora surcularia
- †Syringospira
  - †Syringospira prima

== T ==
- †Tarassocrinus
  - †Tarassocrinus synchlydus
- †Tarthinia
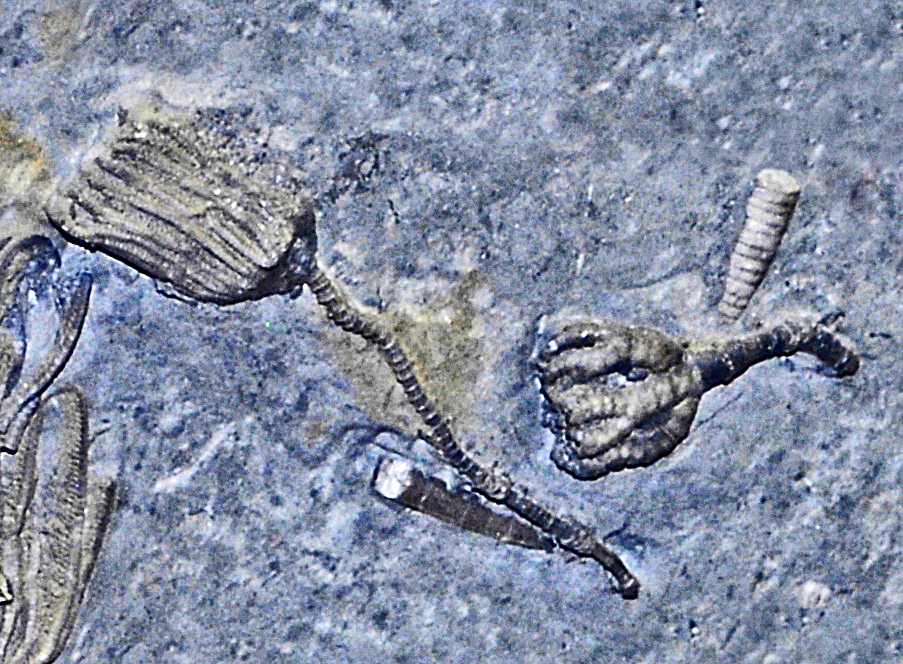
- Fossil of the Silurian-Carboniferous crinoid ("sea lily") Taxocrinus (right)
  †Taxocrinus
- †Toernquistia
- †Trichopitys
  - †Trichopitys whitei
- †Trochonema
  - †Trochonema umbilicata

== U ==
- †Ullmannia
- †Ulocrinus
  - †Ulocrinus rockymontanus

== V ==
- †Vanuxemia
  - †Vanuxemia rotundata
- †Vaughnictis
  - †Vaughnictis smithae – type locality for species

== W ==
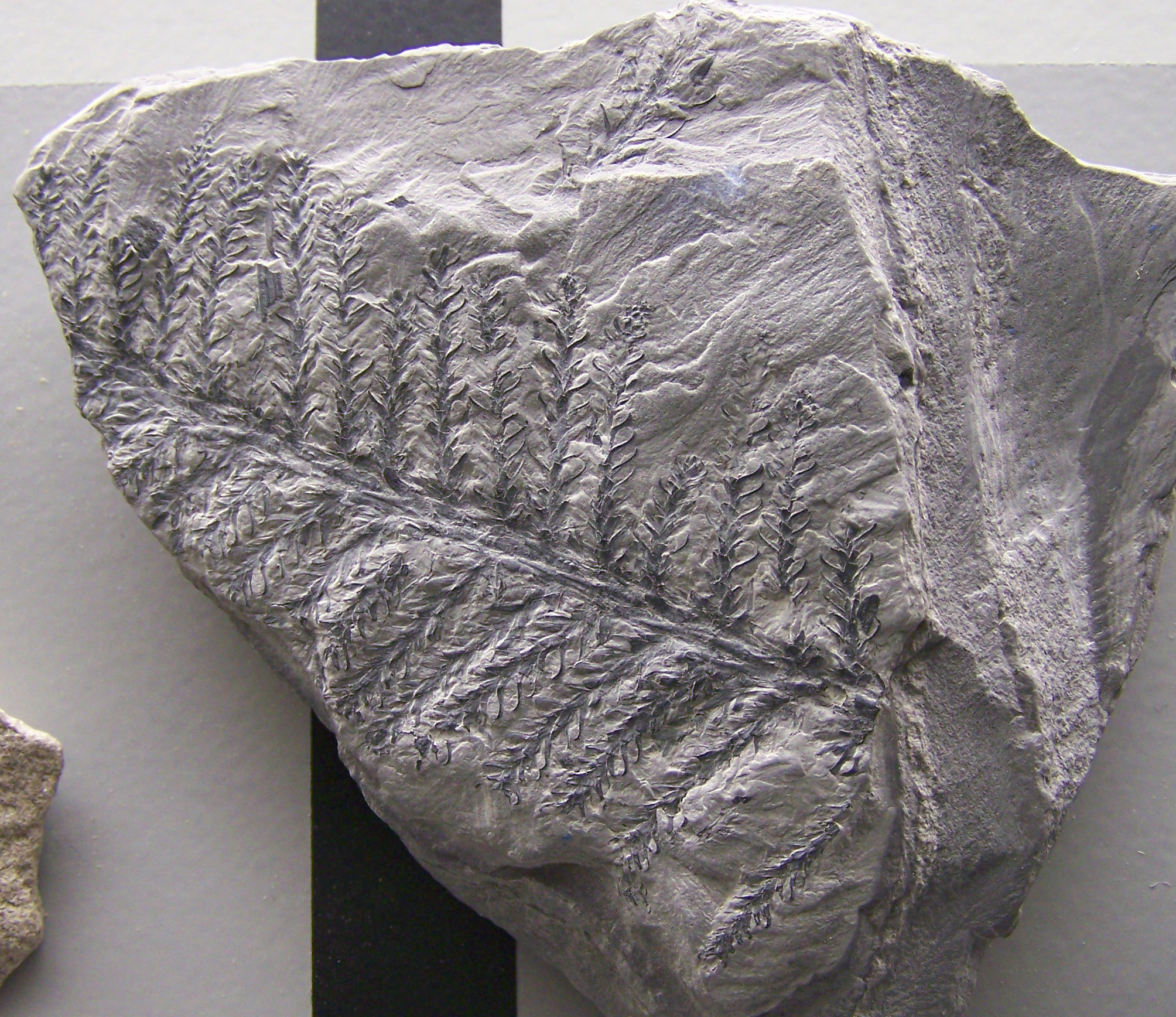
- Fossilized foliage of the Carboniferous-Permian conifer Walchia
  †Walchia
  - †Walchia hypnoides
  - †Walchia imbricata – or unidentified comparable form
  - †Walchia piniformis
  - †Walchia stricta
- †Walchiastrobus
- †Westonoceras
- †Wewokella
  - †Wewokella solida
- †Wilbernicyathus
  - †Wilbernicyathus donegani

== Z ==
- †Zaphrenthis
- †Zygospira
  - †Zygospira modesta – tentative report
