= Édouard de Verneuil =

French paleontologist (1805–1873)

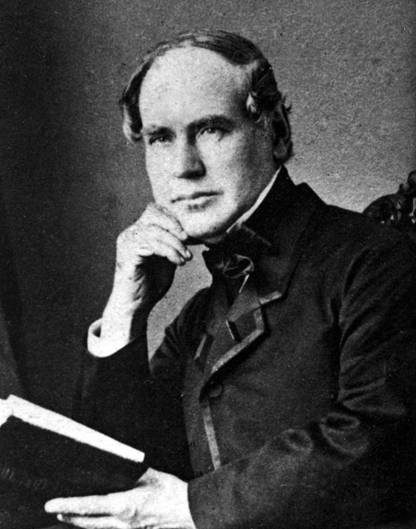
Edouard de Verneuil in 1860

Philippe Édouard Poulletier de Verneuil (French pronunciation: [filip edwaʁ pultje də vɛʁnœj]; 13 February 1805 – 29 May 1873) was a French paleontologist.

== Life ==
He was born in Paris and educated in law, but being of independent means he was free to follow his own inclinations, and having attended lectures on geology by Jean-Baptiste Elie de Beaumont he was so attracted to the subject that he devoted himself assiduously to the study of science. He spent several years in travel through various parts of Europe, specially examining the geology of the Crimea, on which he published an essay (Mem. Soc. Geol. France, 1837). He next investigated the Devonian rocks and fossils of the Bas-Boulonnais; and in 1839 accompanied Sedgwick and Murchison in a study of the older Palaeozoic rocks of the Rhenish provinces and Belgium, the palaeontological results being communicated to the Geological Society of London in conjunction with the Vicomte d'Archiac.

When Murchison commenced his geological examination of the Russian empire, he requested de Verneuil to accompany him, and the researches of the latter were incorporated in the second volume of The Geology of Russia in Europe and the Ural Mountains (1845). Subsequently, de Verneuil paid a visit to the United States to study the history of the palaeozoic rocks in that country, and the results were published in 1847 (Bull. Soc. Geol. France). In later years he made numerous expeditions into Spain, and his observations were embodied in Carte geologique de l'Espagne et du Portugal (1864), prepared in association with Edouard Collomb. In 1853 the Wollaston medal of the Geological Society of London was awarded to him, and in 1860 he was elected a foreign member of the Royal Society. He died in Paris.

De Verneuil was President of the Geological Society of France in 1840, 1853, and 1867.

The deformed brachiopod fossil Cyrtospirifer verneuili, known to quarrymen as the Delabole Butterfly, was found in the upper Devonian beds of North Cornwall. It was named after de Verneuil.
