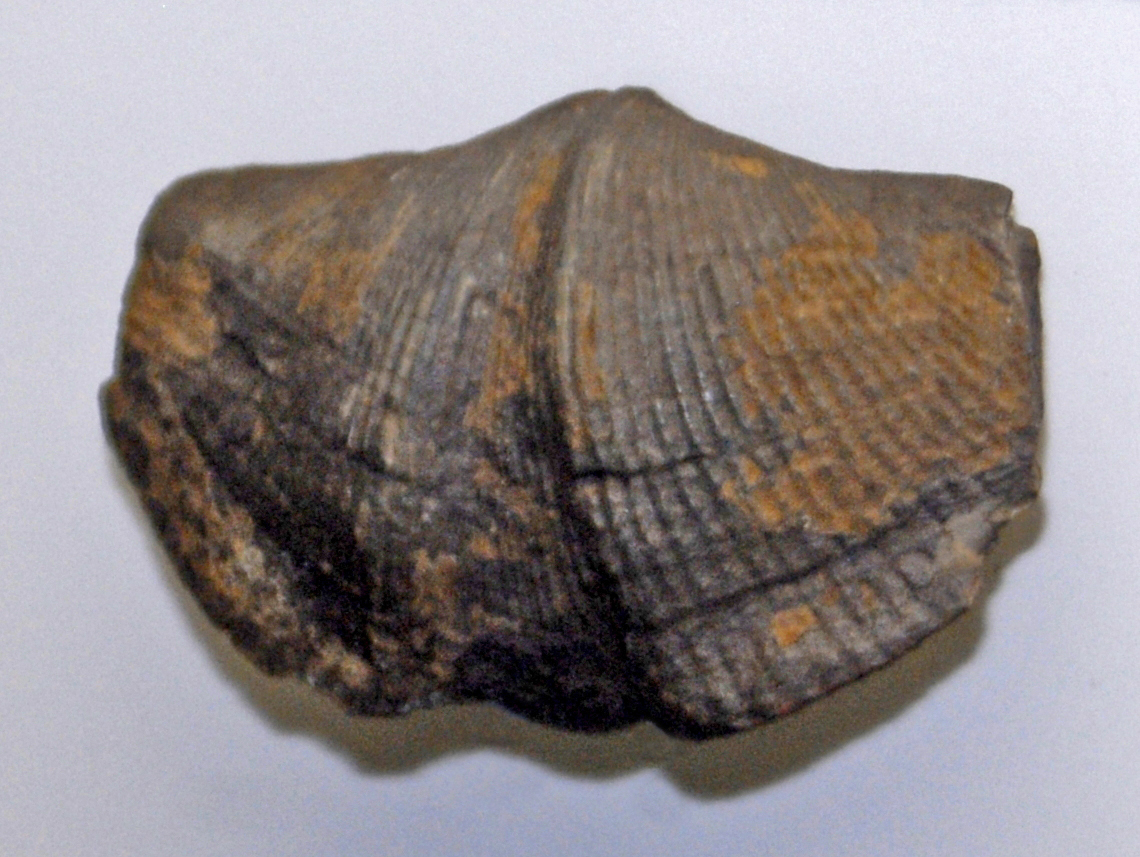
- Fossil specimen of Cyrtospirifer verneuili

Scientific classification
- Domain: Eukaryota
- Kingdom: Animalia
- Phylum: Brachiopoda
- Class: Rhynchonellata
- Order: †Spiriferida
- Suborder: †Spiriferidina
- Superfamily: †Cyrtospiriferoidea
- Family: †Cyrtospiriferidae; Termier & Termier, 1949

= Cyrtospiriferidae =

Family of brachiopods

Cyrtospiriferidae is an extinct family of brachiopods.

== Genera ==
- Acutella
- Austrospirifer
- Cyrtiopsis
- Cyrtospirifer
- Dichospirifer
- Dmitria
- Eodmitria
- Liraspirifer
- Mennespirifer
- Petshorospirifer
- Platyspirifer
- Pripyatispirifer
- Sinospirifer
- Sphaenospira
- Syringospira
- Tarandrospirifer
- Tenticospirifer
- Uchtospirifer
