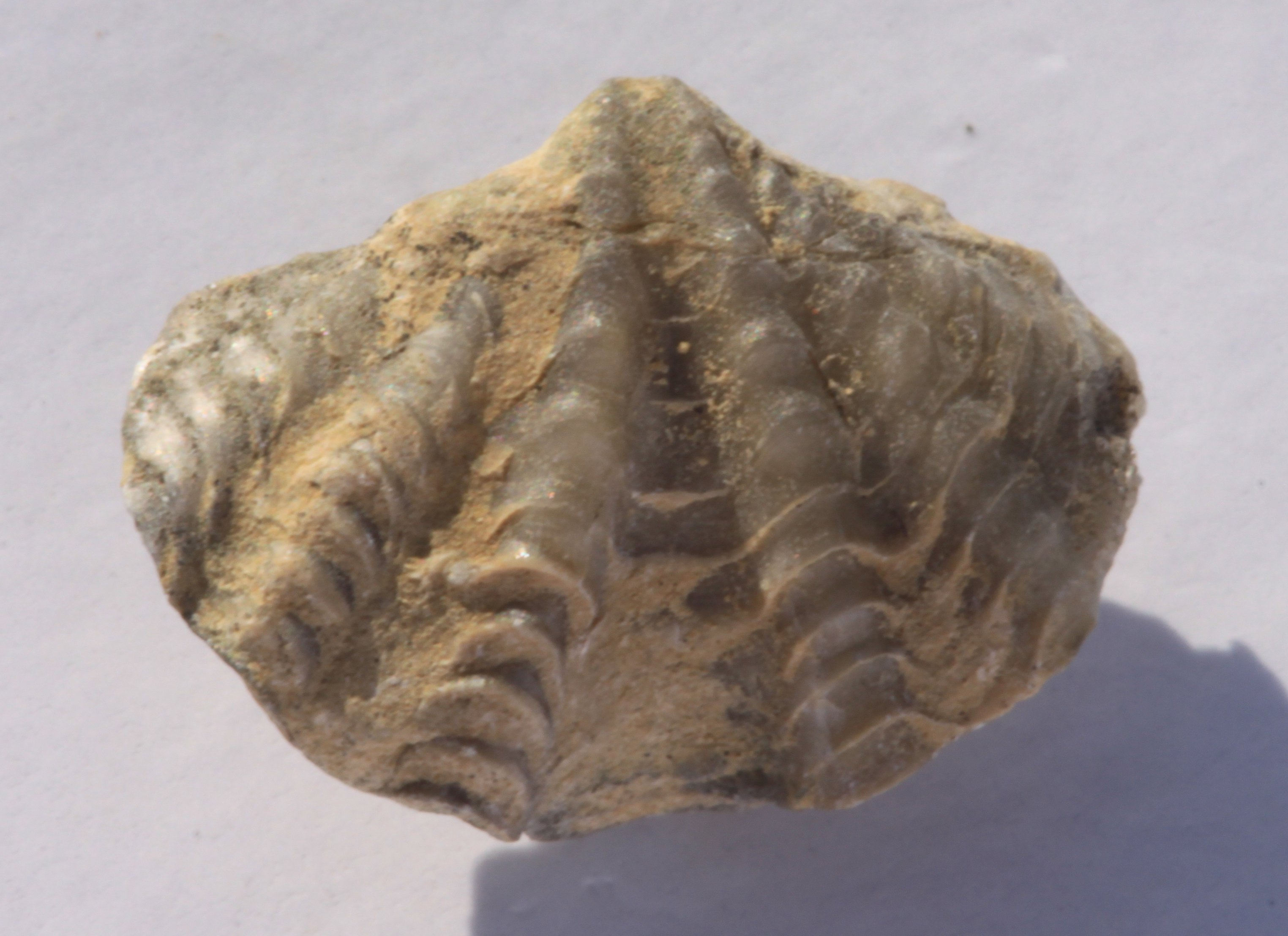
- ↑S. perlamellosus, 19mm - pedunculate valve ↓S. striatus: exterior, and interior with the skeleton of the lophophore (spiralium)
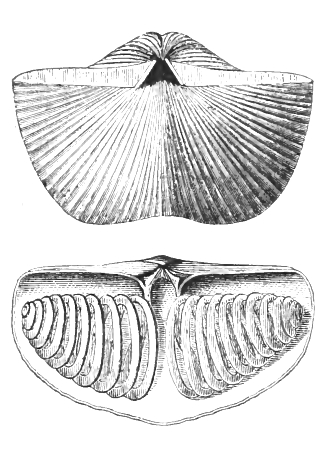

Scientific classification
- Kingdom: Animalia
- Phylum: Brachiopoda
- Class: Rhynchonellata
- Order: †Spiriferida
- Family: †Spiriferidae
- Subfamily: †Spiriferinae
- Genus: †Spirifer; Sowerby, 1818

Species
- See text

= Spirifer =

Spirifer Temporal range: Tournaisian-Bashkirian ~358–315 Ma

Extinct genus of brachiopods

Spirifer is a genus of marine brachiopods belonging to the order Spiriferida and family Spiriferidae. Species belonging to the genus lived in the Carboniferous (certainly in the Tournaisian and in the Visean, possibly also in the Serpukhovian and the Bashkirian).

This genus used to be treated more widely, so less critical sources list its species from the Middle Ordovician (Sandbian) through to the Late Triassic (Carnian) with a global distribution.

Like most brachiopods, representatives of Spirifer were stationary epifaunal suspension feeders.

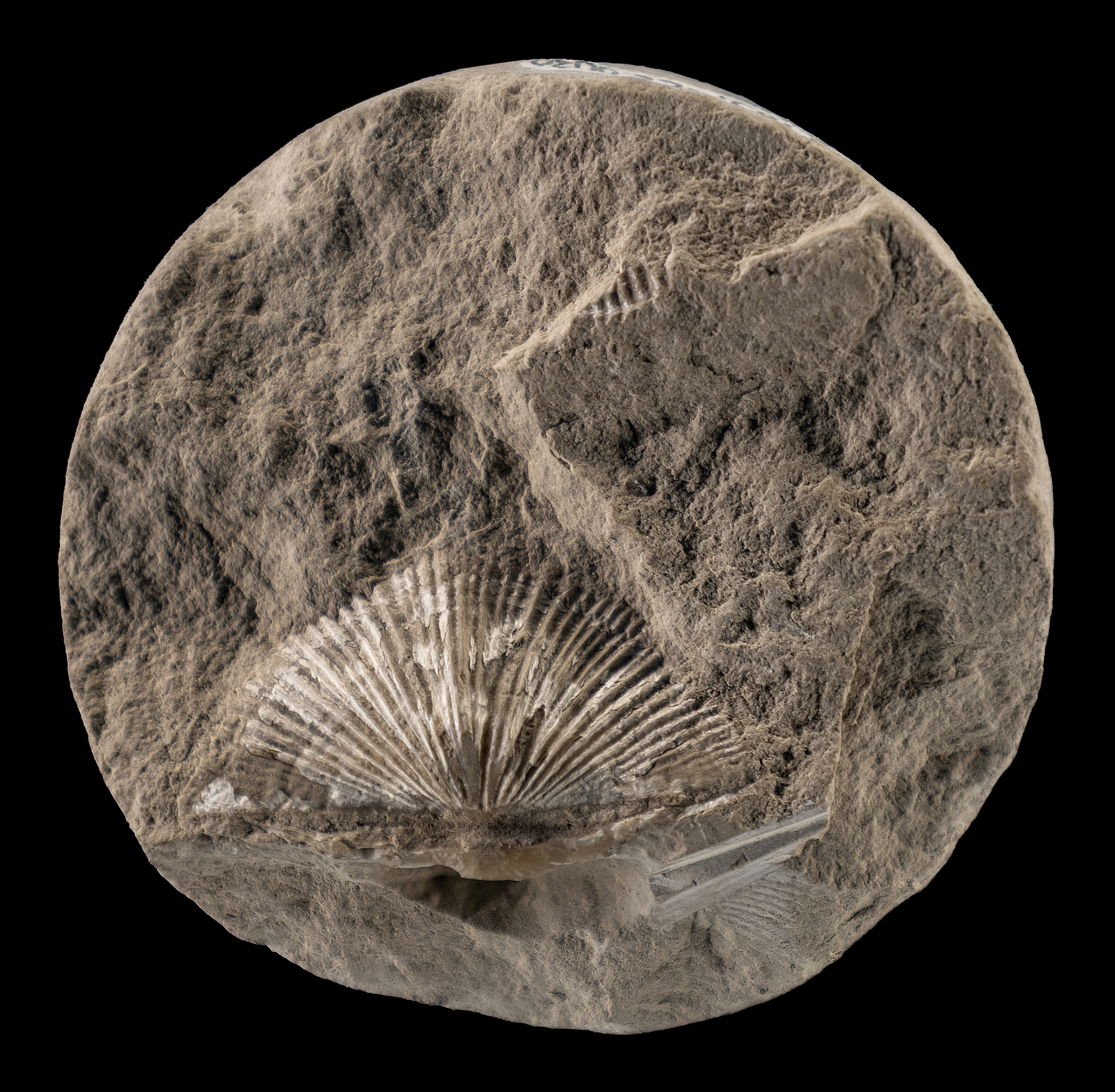
S. missouriensis. Early Carboniferous, Radville, Saskatchewan (Canada). At the Royal Tyrrell Museum of Palaeontology.

== Selected species ==
- Spirifer acutiplicatus Hayasaka, 1933
- Spirifer bambadhurensis Diener, 1903
- Spirifer baschkirica Tschernyschew, 1902
- Spirifer battu Gemmellaro, 1899
- Spirifer byrangi Chernyak, 1963
- Spirifer carnicus Schellwien, 1892
- Spirifer concentricus Lee and Su, 1980
- Spirifer distefanii Gemmellaro, 1899
- Spirifer dvinaensis Licharew, 1927
- Spirifer enderlei Tschernyschew, 1902
- Spirifer engelgardthi Chernyak, 1963
- Spirifer fritschi Schellwien, 1892
- Spirifer holodnensis Chernyak, 1963
- Spirifer lirellus Cvancara, 1958
- Spirifer malistanensis Plodowski, 1968
- Spirifer muensteri Suess, 1854
- Spirifer opimus Hall, 1858
- Spirifer pentagonoides Plodowski, 1968
- Spirifer pentlandi d'Orbigny, 1842
- Spirifer perlamellosus Hall, 1857
- Spirifer piassinaensis Chernyak, 1963
- Spirifer postventricosus Tschernyschew, 1902
- Spirifer pseudotasmaniensis Einor, 1939
- Spirifer rakuszi Einor, 1946
- Spirifer rockymontanus Marcou, 1858
- Spirifer schellwieni Tschernyschew, 1902
- Spirifer siculus Gemmellaro, 1899
- Spirifer spitiensis Stoliczka, 1865
- Spirifer strangwaysi De Verneuil, 1845
- Spirifer striatus Martin, 1809
- Spirifer subgrandiformis Plodowski, 1968
- Spirifer subtrigonalis Gemmellaro, 1899
- Spirifer supracarbonicus Tschernyschew, 1902
- Spirifer supramosquensis Nikitin, 1890
- Spirifer tareiaensis Einor, 1939
- Spirifer tegulatus Trautschold, 1876
- Spirifer undata Reed, 1944
- Spirifer uralicus Tschernyschew, 1902
- Spirifer zitteli Schellwien, 1892

== Reassigned species ==
As Spirifer has been described early on, since then, many species have been reassigned.

- S. archiaciformis = Sinospirifer subextensus
- S. bisulcatus = Angiospirifer bisulcatus
- S. chinensis mut. α = Sinospirifer subextensus
- S. gortanioides = Plicapustula gortanioides
- S. hayasakai = Lamarckispirifer hayasakai
- S. heterosinosus = Sinospirifer subextensus
- S. martellii = Plicapustula martellii
- S. pekinensis = Plicapustula pekinensis
- S. pellizzarii = Sinospirifer subextensus
- S. pellizzariformis = Sinospirifer subextensus
- S. pinguis = Latibrachythyris pinguis
- S. rotundatus = Latibrachythyris rotundatus
- S. subhayasakai = Sinospirifer subextensus
- S. verneuili = Cyrtospirifer verneuili
- S. verneuili var. subarchiaci = Plicapustula subarchiaci
- S. verneuili var. subextensus = Sinospirifer subextensus
- S. vilis = Sinospirifer subextensus
- S. wangleighi = Sinospirifer subextensus
- S. yassensis = Spinella yassensis
