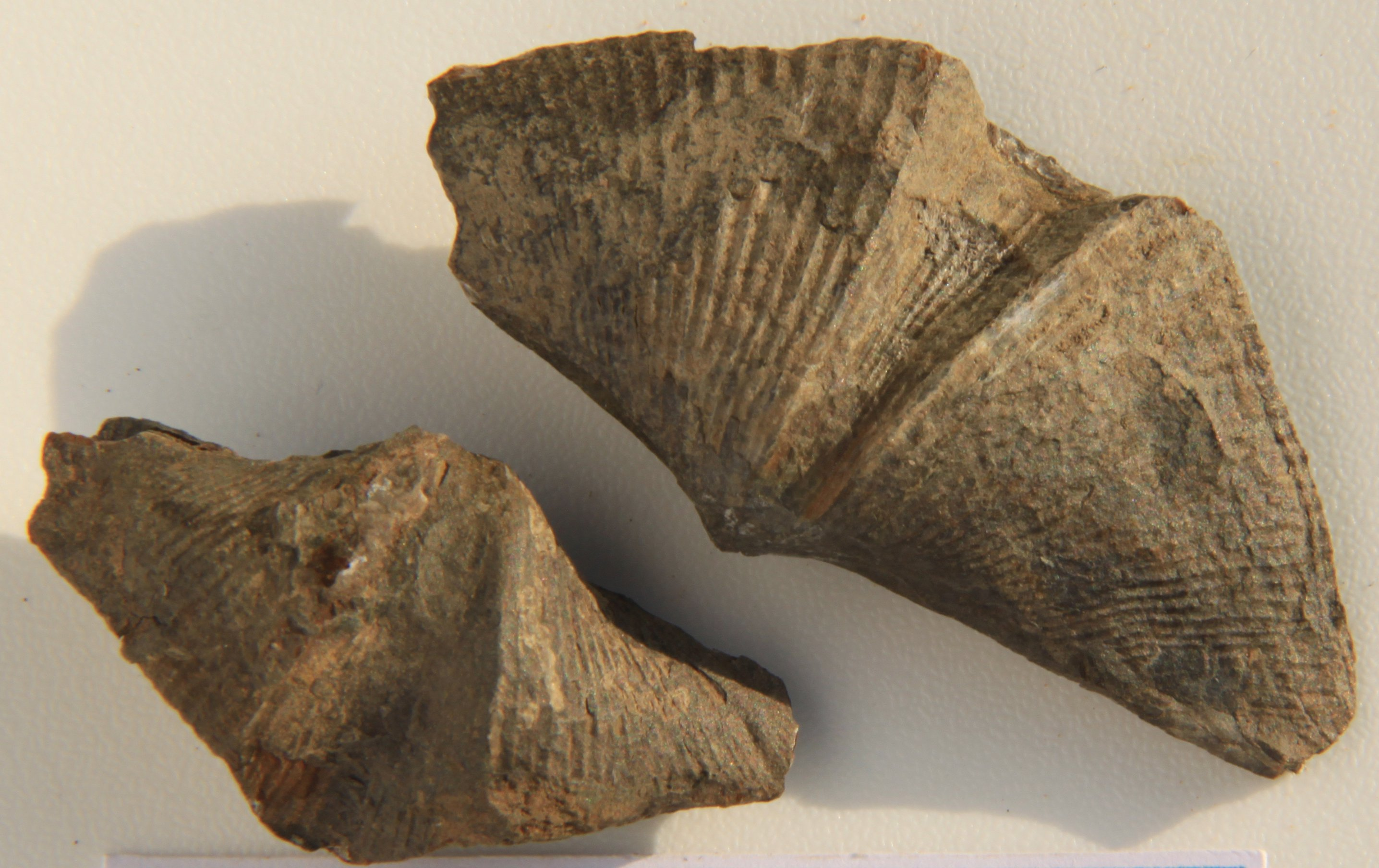
- Cyrtospirifer verneuili from Namur (Belgium), Upper Devonian

Scientific classification
- Domain: Eukaryota
- Kingdom: Animalia
- Phylum: Brachiopoda
- Class: Rhynchonellata
- Order: †Spiriferida
- Family: †Cyrtospiriferidae
- Genus: †Cyrtospirifer; Nalivkin, 1924

Species
- C. verneuili (Murchison), 1840 (type) = Spirifer verneuili, S. lonsdalii; C. ainosawensis Tazawa, Inose & Kaneko, 2017; C. aouinetensis Gourvennec, 2019; C. archiaci (Murchison, 1840); C. chemungensis (Conrad, 1842) = Delthyris chemungensis, C. altiplicus; C. choanjiensis Tazawa, 2017; C. conoideus (Roemer, 1843); C. disjunctus (Sowerby,1840); C. inermis (Hall, 1843) = Delthyris inermis; C. hornellensis Greiner, 1957; C. kharaulakhensis Fredericks, 1919; C. loonesi Brice, 2002; C. mylaensis Sokiran, 2006; C. placitus Stainbrook, 1945; C. preshoensis Greiner, 1957; C. robardeti Gourvennec, 2019; C. rudkinensis Sokiran, 2006; C. schelonicus Nalivkin, 1941; C. syringothyriformis (Paeckelmann, 1942); C. tenticulum (Verneuil, 1845) = Spirifer tenticulum; C. whitneyi (Hall, 1858)

= Cyrtospirifer =

Cyrtospirifer Temporal range: Upper Givetian - Lower Famennian

Extinct genus of brachiopods

Cyrtospirifer is an extinct genus of brachiopods. The fossils are present in the Middle and Upper Devonian.

== Taxonomy ==
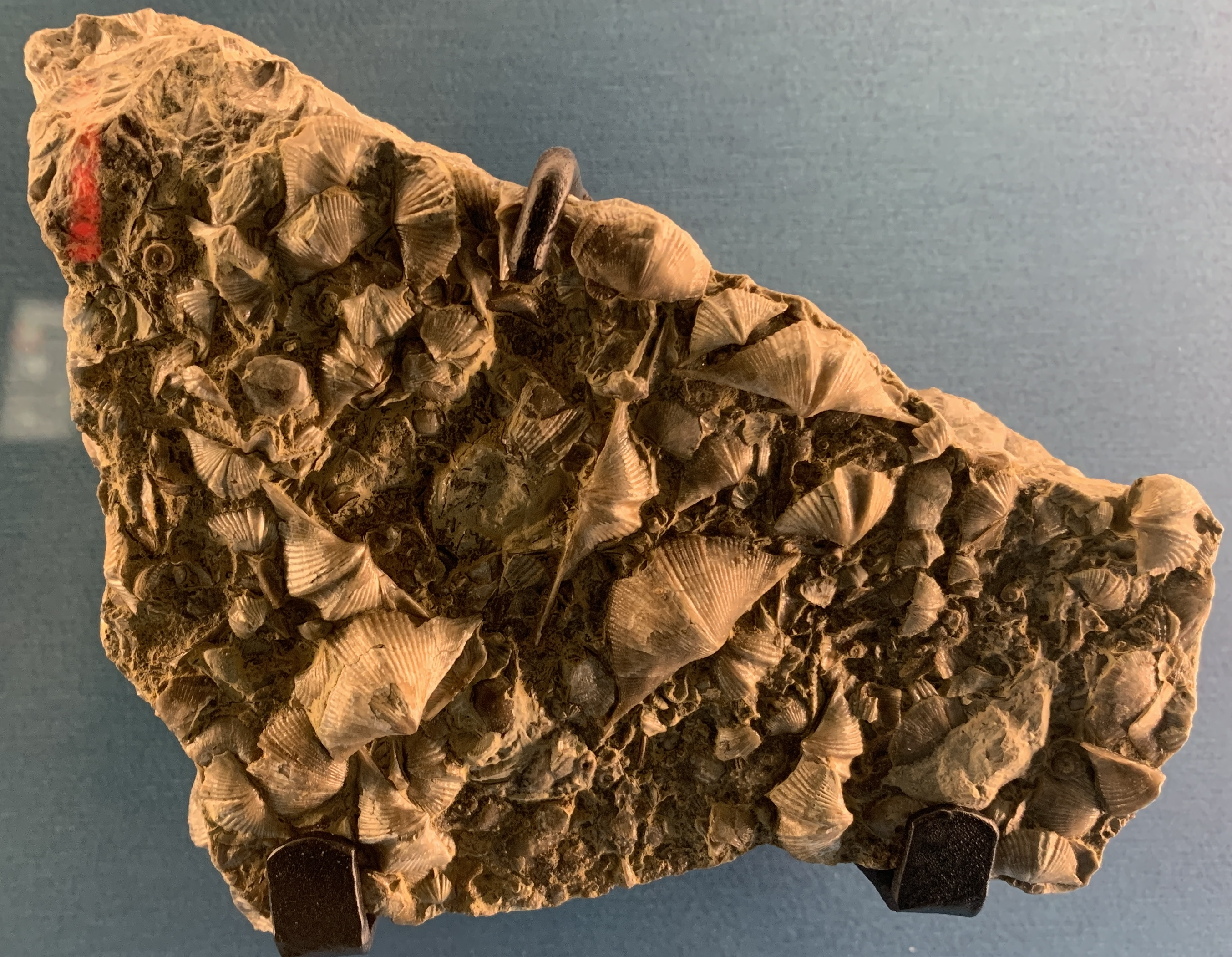
Cyrtospirifer sp. with Cyrtina sp. and Eleutherokomma sp.

It is likely that Tenticospirifer, that itself appeared during early Givetian, includes the ancestor of Cyrtospirifer. Cyrtospirifer first occurs in western Europe in the Late Givetian. Tenticospirifer has a relatively narrow hinge line and an inflated and thick shell in common with two of the oldest species known, C. verneuiliformis and C. aperturatus. This group dominated during the late Givetian, but was replaced by other species, such as C. syringothyriformis and C. verneuili which have wide hinge lines and thinner shells.

== Description ==
Cyrtospirifer has a medium to large sized shell, wider than long.

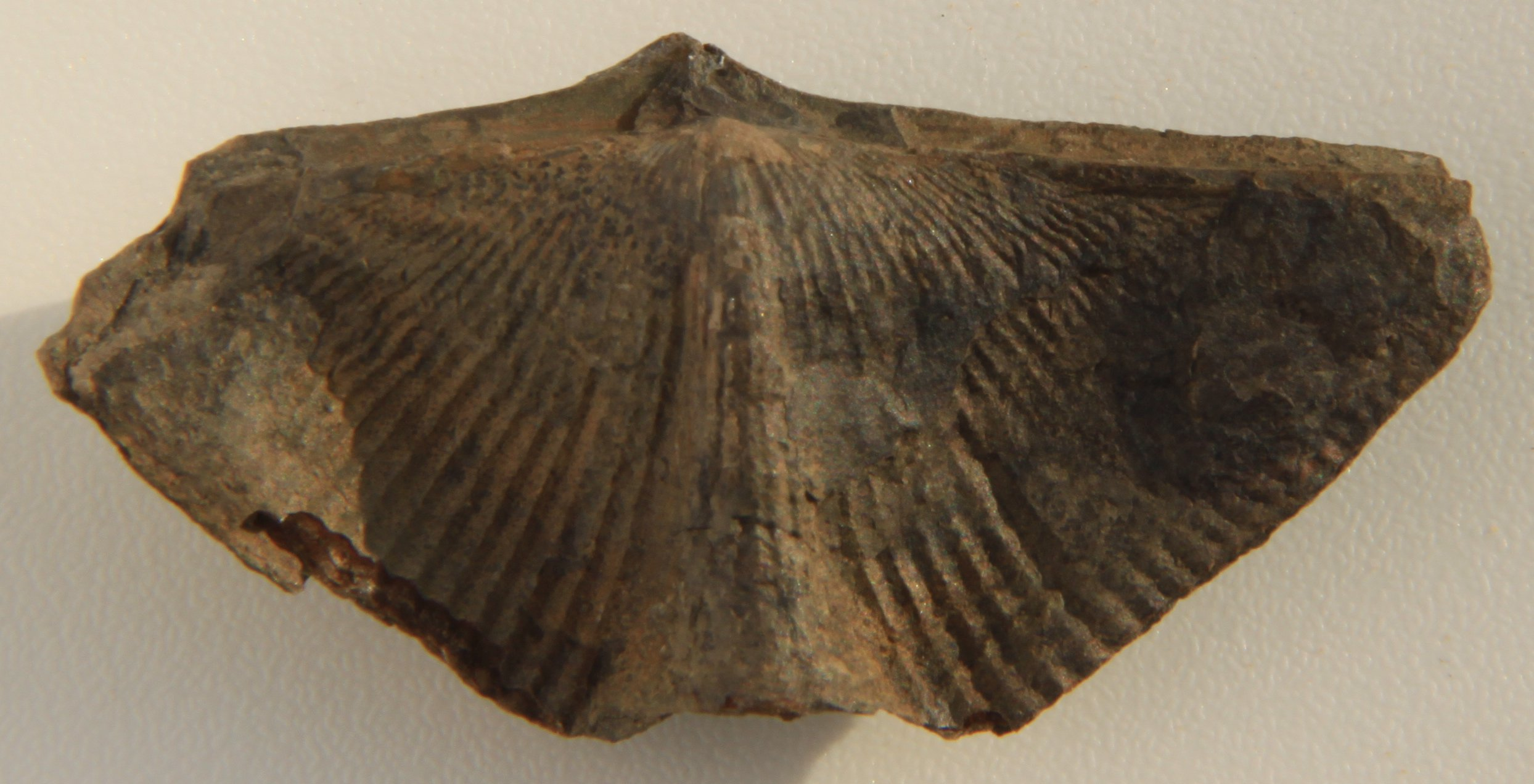
Cyrtospirifer verneuili, 24mm long and about 60mm wide, brachial valve

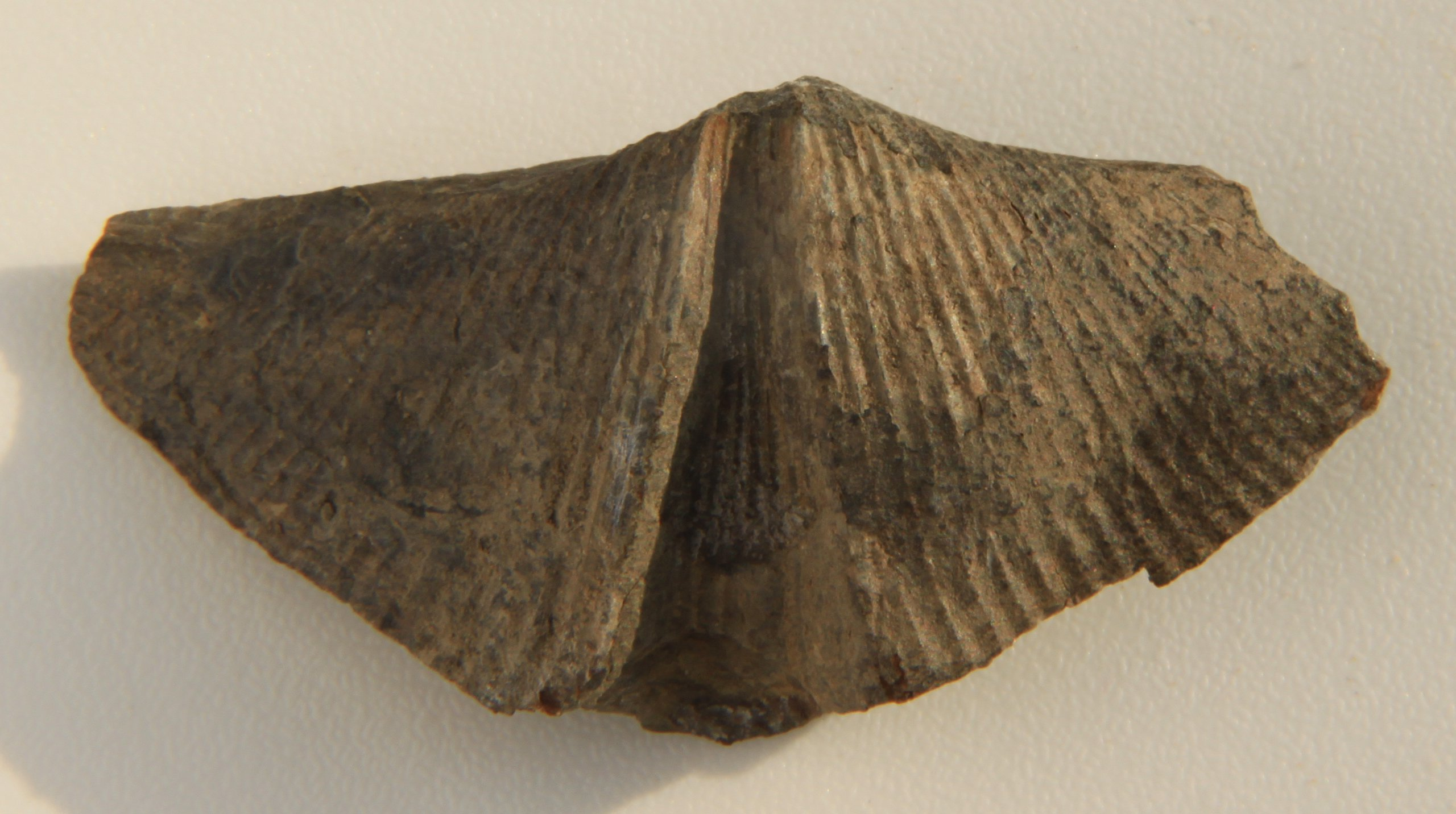
pedicle valve

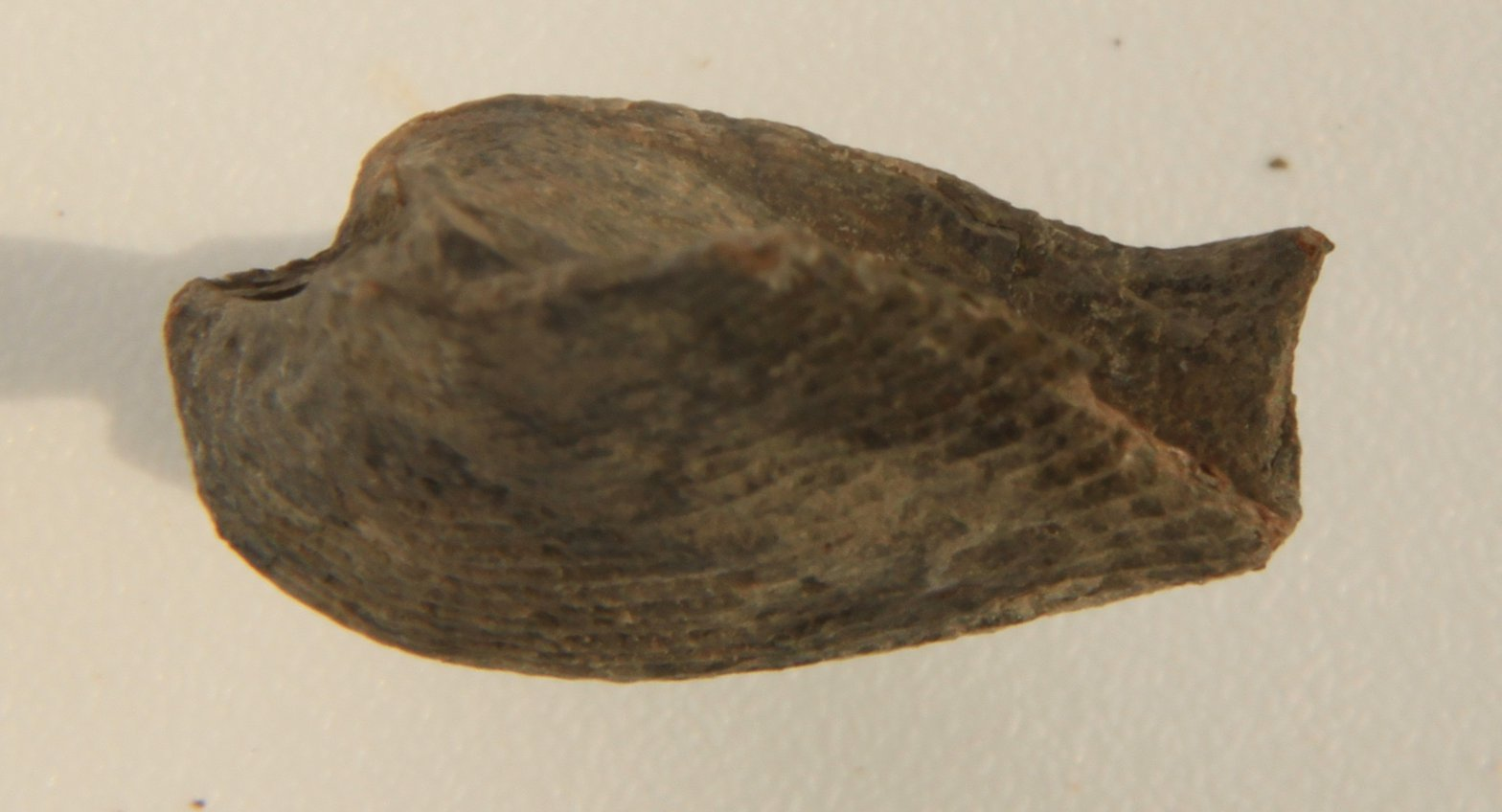
lateral

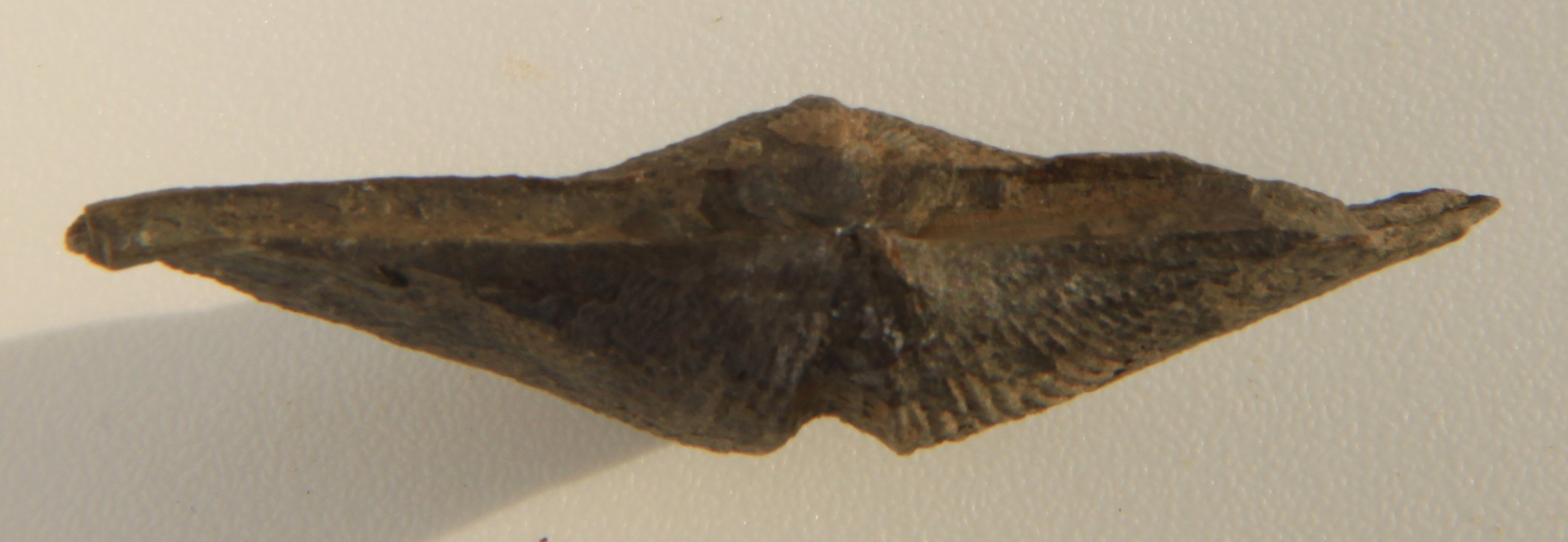
posterior

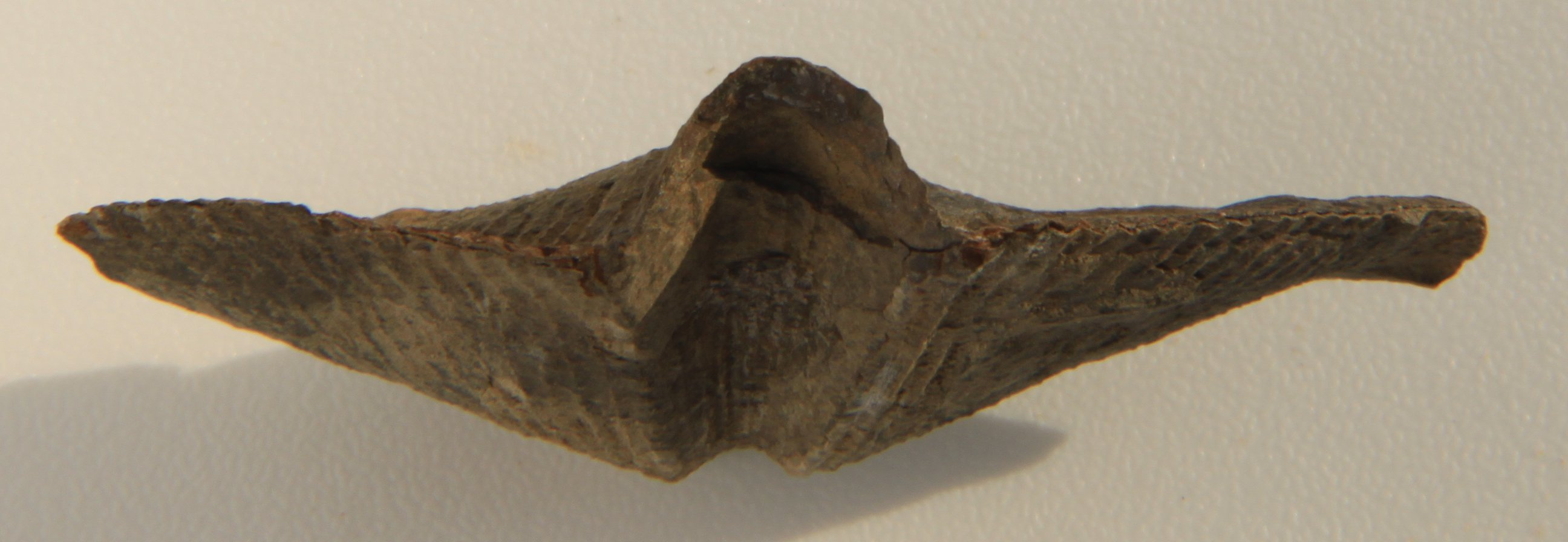
anterior

== Reassigned species ==
- C. glaucus = Regelia glauca
