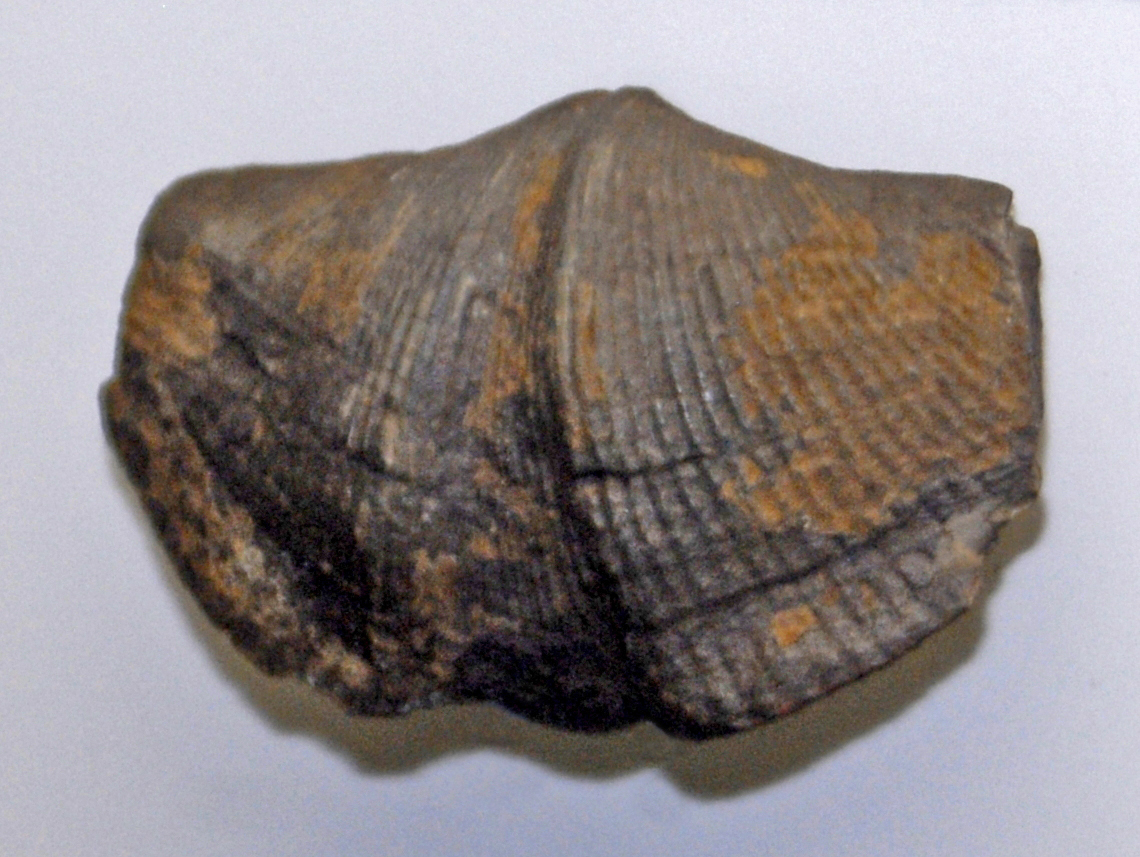
- Fossil specimen of Cyrtospirifer verneuili from Namur (Belgium), Upper Devonian

Scientific classification
- Domain: Eukaryota
- Kingdom: Animalia
- Phylum: Brachiopoda
- Class: Rhynchonellata
- Order: †Spiriferida
- Family: †Cyrtospiriferidae
- Genus: †Cyrtospirifer
- Species: †C. verneuili

Binomial name
- †Cyrtospirifer verneuili (Murchison, 1840)

= Cyrtospirifer verneuili =

Extinct species of marine lamp shell

Cyrtospirifer verneuili, also called Spirifer verneuili, is an extinct species of brachiopod. The fossils are present in the Upper Devonian.

In Cornwall they have the vernacular name Delabole butterfly, from the appearance of flattened forms in the slates at Delabole.
