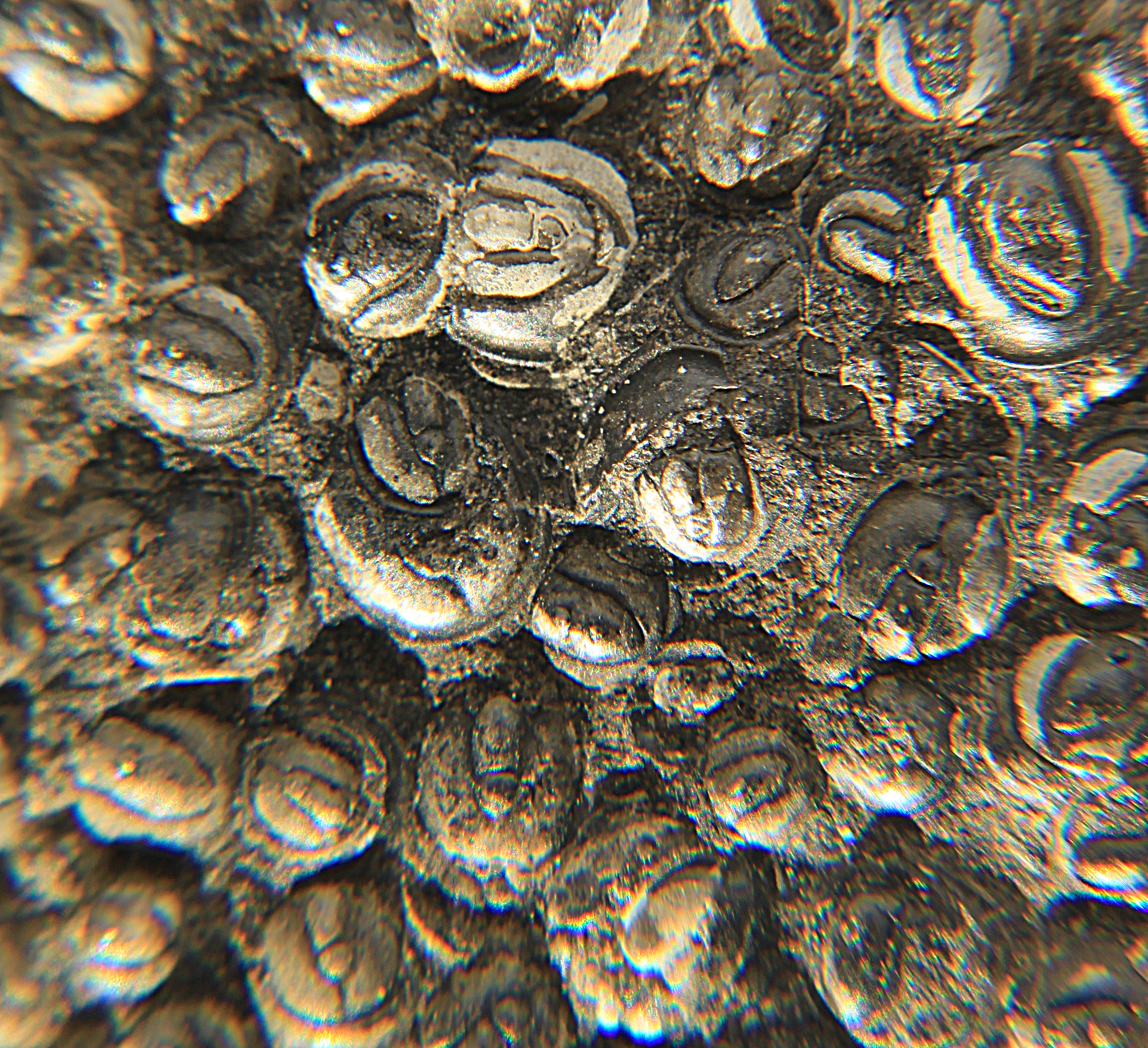
- Disarticulated cephalons and pygidia of Agnostus pisiformis, from Kinnekulle, Sweden

Scientific classification
- Kingdom: Animalia
- Phylum: Arthropoda
- Clade: †Artiopoda
- Class: †Trilobita (?)
- Order: †Agnostida
- Family: †Agnostidae
- Genus: †Agnostus; Brongniart, 1822

Subgenera
- Agnostus (Agnostus); type A. pisiformis (Wahlenberg, 1818) synonym Entomostracites pisiformes; Agnostus (Homagnostus) (Howell, 1935); type A. (Homagnostus) obesus (Belt, 1867) synonym A. pisiformis var. obesus, Homagnostus obesus; and see text

= Agnostus =

Agnostus Temporal range: upper Middle Cambrian–late Upper Cambrian

Extinct genus of trilobites

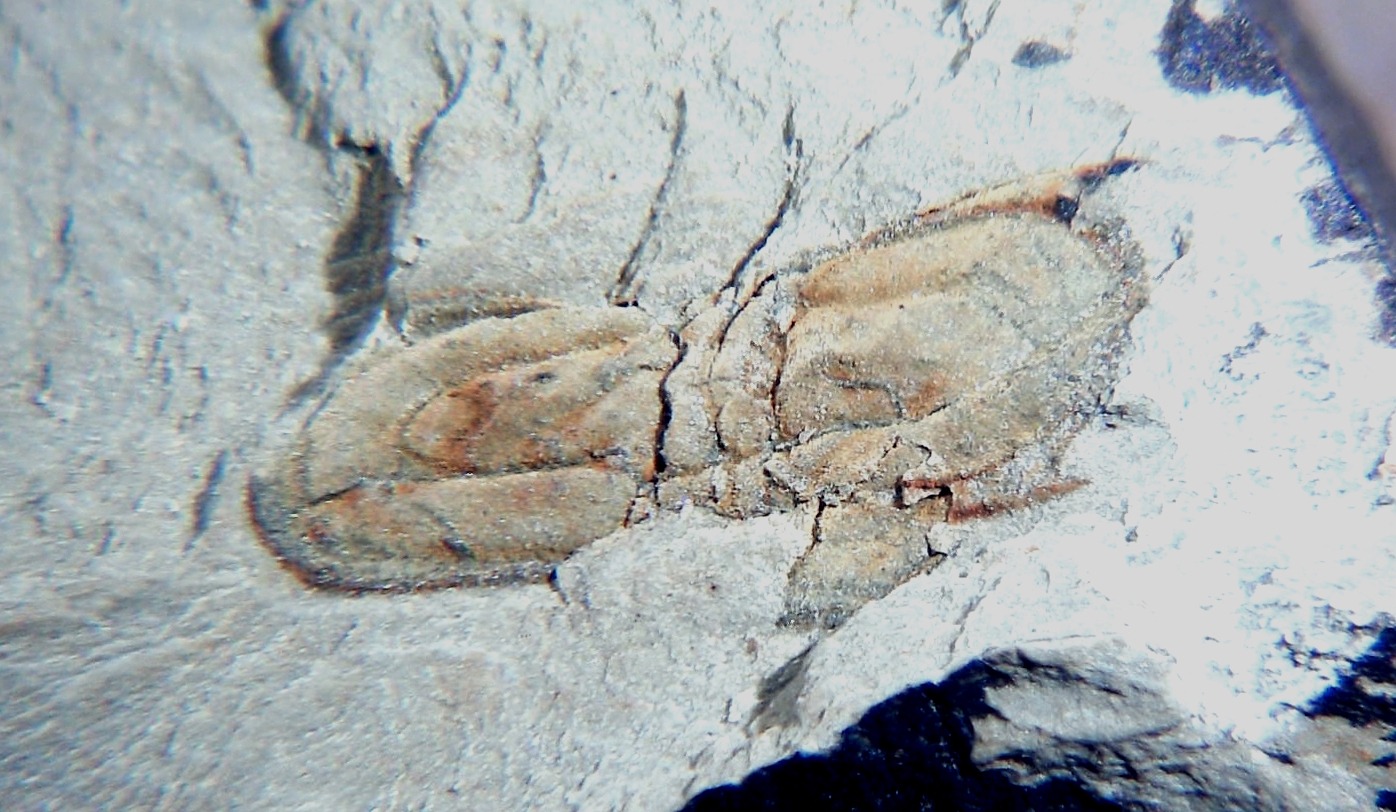
Agnostus sp. from the Middle Cambrian of Couloma, Hérault, France. Max Rouger Collection.

Agnostus is a genus of agnostid trilobites, belonging to the family Agnostidae, that lived during the late Middle Cambrian – Upper Cambrian (about 506 to 485 million years ago). It is the type genus of the family Agnostidae and is subdivided into two subgenera, Agnostus and Homagnostus.

== Etymology ==
Agnostus is from the Ancient Greek άγνωστος (ágnostos) "unknown", and reflects the fact that early paleontologists did not know what type of animal with which they were confronted. The species epithet has this origin:

- pisiformis derives from the Latin pīsum which means "pea", and forma meaning "shape", for its globe-like appearance when rolled.

== Description ==
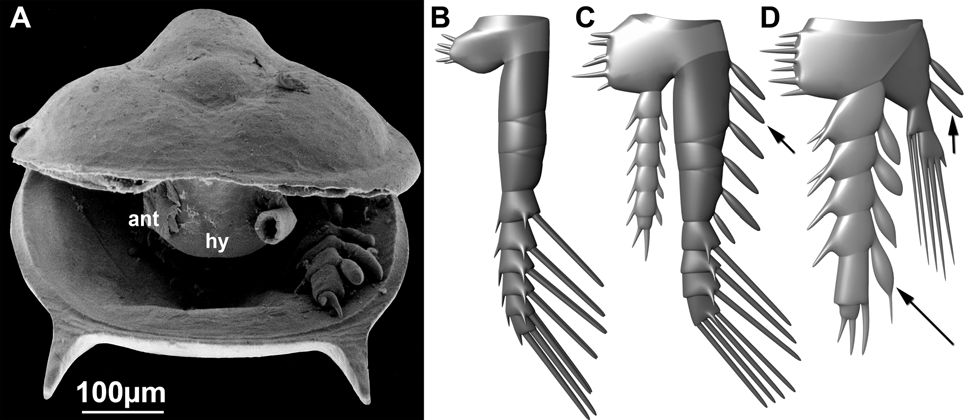
SEM micrograph of a fossil of Agnostus pisiformis and reconstruction of 2-4th cephalic appendages

Like all Agnostida, Agnostus is diminutive and the headshield (or cephalon) and tailshield (or pygidium) are around the same size (or isopygous) and outline. As in all Agnostina, Agnostus has two thorax segments. When Agnostina are enrolled, a tiny opening between the cephalon and the thorax becomes visible (the cephalothoracic aperture) that uniquely distinguishes this group from the Eodiscina. Two features shared with all Agnostoidea are that the basal glabellar lobes are anteriorly expanded, and that the frontal lobe of the central raised area of the cephalon (or glabella) is not laterally expanded compared to the backward lobe. This is unlike in the Condylopygoidea. In all Agnostidae the cephalic border is narrow and the pygidial axis is simple, the posterior lobe not wider than the anterior (or axiolobate), and usually long but not reaching border furrow. In Agnostus the glabella is connected to the border by a median preglabellar furrow. The anterior glabellar lobe is ogival or rounded at its front. The posterior lobe tapers forward. The glabella carries an axial node level with or slightly behind a variably developed second furrow. The pygidium has a long axis, although this usually does not reach the border furrow. The pygidial axis (or rhachis) is not connected to the border by a median (postaxial ) furrow. The pygidium carries backward directed spines on its margins, where it curves back towards the midline.

In the subgenus Agnostus (Agnostus), the axis of the pygidium is relatively narrow, ending pointed, or narrowly rounded, and furrows crossing the pygidial axis are weak at best. The subgenus Agnostus (Homagnostus) has a broadly rounded termination of the axis extending nearly to posterior border furrow. The axis is narrower halfway along its length and crossing furrows are well developed.

=== Appendages ===
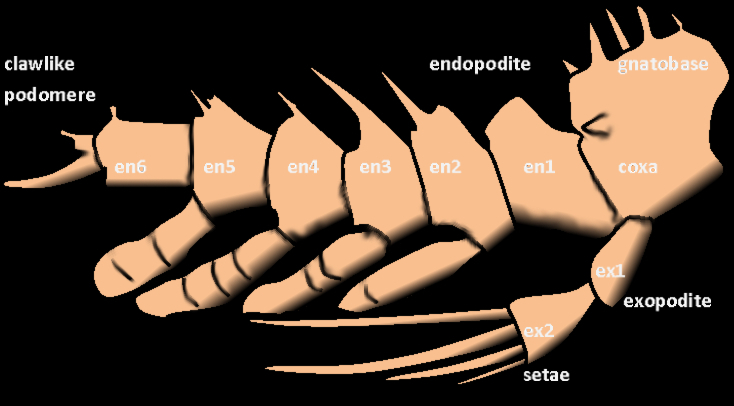
Drawing of a biramous leg of Agnostus pisiformis

Agnostid appendages are known only from exceptionally preserved specimens of Agnostus pisiformis from the Upper Cambrian Orsten deposits of Sweden (Müller & Walossek 1987) and the appendages of meraspid developmental stages of A. pisiformis (½-1 mm total body length) are the best preserved of any trilobite found so far. The species has nine pairs of appendages, the antennules and eight pairs of "legs" that differ in size and composition. Four pairs of appendages originate from the cephalon, two from the thorax, and three from the pygidium. The frontal antennule are short and stout. The most forward pair of "legs" has a small coxa, a seven-podomere exopodite carrying long, bristle-like setae and gill-like extensions, and no endopodite. The second pair has a five-podomere exopodite and a six-podomere endopodite. The third has a three-podomere exopodite and a six-podomere endopodite. The fourth has a two-podomere exopodite and a seven-podomere endopodite. The fifth has a single-podomere exopodite and a six-podomere endopodite. Further appendages are more and more reduced in size and complexity (Müller & Walossek 1987).

== Distribution ==
Agnostus is said to have had a cosmopolitan distribution. The nominate subgenus occurs from the late Middle Cambrian to the early Upper Cambrian, while the subgenus Agnostus (Homagnostus) is restricted to the early Upper Cambrian.

- A. artilimbatus occurs in the Middle Cambrian of Kazakhstan (Kyrshabakty River: Lejopyge armata trilobite zone, Zhumabai Formation, Goniagnostus nathorsti trilobite zone, Aktas Formation; Ayusokkanian (505.0 - 498.5 Ma), 43.5° N, 70.0° E).
- A. pisiformis is known from the earliest Upper Cambrian of Sweden (A. pisiformis Zone, Alum shale, Adrarum, Scania). The species was first recorded in the UK by Rushton (1978, p. 258, pl. 24, figs. 15–19) from the Mancetter and Outwoods Formations and A. pisiformis Biozone within the Merevale No. 3 Boreole, Nuneaton, Central England. It occurs in east maritime Canada (the pisiformis Zone and also in the laevigata Zone, judging from the information given by Hutchinson, 1962, p. 127, etc.) and also in Siberia (A. pisiformis – Homagnostus fecundus Zone (Ivshin and Pokrovskaya, 1968). More recently, A. pisiformis has been recovered from the Aber Llong Formation, Loch Warren [SM 7912 2387], NNE of Cradle Rock, and about 500 m east of Porth-y-rhaw, near St Davids, South West Wales (Guzhangian Stage, pisiformis Biozone).

== Taxonomy ==
A. pisiformis was the first nominal species to be described and illustrated in the literature. Magnus von Bromell in 1729 described disarticulated heads and tails in matrix as "minimorum vermiculorum vaginipennium" ("small beetle-like worms"). The earlier concepts of the genus Agnostus were very wide, initially including almost all of the Agnostida, but this has gradually been narrowed down. This is the reason why a large number of species are now assigned to other genera, often in other families or even to the Eodiscina.

=== Species ===
Species classified under the genus include:

For authorship of the Type species, A. pisiformis, see Rushton (1978, p.258).

- A. pisiformis Wahlenberg, 1818; non Linnaeus, 1757, p.121. (Type species)
- A. obesus Belt, 1867
- A. artilimbatus Öpik, 1967
- A. babcocki Peng and Robison, 2000
- A. captiosus Lazarenko, 1966
- (?) A. medius
- (?) A. angustus
- A. neglectus Westergard, 1946
- A. valentinus Lochman, 1944

=== Species previously assigned to Agnostus ===
As the genus Agnostus was erected early on, many species have since been reassigned.

- A. acadicus = Acadagnostus acadicus
- A. acadicus declivus = Peronopsis (Svenax) scutalis
- A. acutilobus = Triplagnostus acutilobus
- A. americanus = Lotagnostus americanus
- A. atavus = Ptychagnostus atavus
- A. barlowi = Ciceragnostus barlowi
- A. bidens = Acadagnostus rakuroensis
- A. bifidus = Pseudoperonopsis bifidus
- A. bituberculatus = Toragnostus bituberculatus
- A. brevifrons = Hypagnostus brevifrons
- A. brevispinus = Redeagnostus ferox
- A. brighamensis = Pentagnostus (Pentagnostus) brighamensis
- A. caducus = Segmentagnostus caducus
- A. calvus = Micragnostus calvus
- A. cambrensis = Peronopsis (Peronopsis) redita
- A. chinensis = undetermined Baltagnostus
- A. consors = Geragnostus consors
- A. cyclopyge = Pseudagnostus cyclopyge
- A. cyclopygeformis = Rhaptagnostus cyclopygeformis
- A. damesi = Acadagnostus acadicus
- A. desideratus = Mallagnostus desideratus
- A. dusli = Granuloagnostus dusli
- A. dux = Anglagnostus dux
- A. elkedrensis = Itagnostus elkedrensis
- A. exaratus = Peronopsis (Svenax) scutalis exarata
- A. exculptus = Tomagnostella exculpta
- A. fallax = Acadagnostus acadicus
- A. ferralsensis = Homagnostoides ferralsensis
- A. fissus = Tomagnostus fissus
- A. frici = Chatkalagnostus frici
- A. galba = Galbagnostus galba
- A. gibbus = Triplagnostus gibbus
- A. gibbus var. hybridus = Onymagnostus hybridus
- A. girvanensis = Trinodus girvanensis
- A. glandiformis = Phalagnostus glandiformis
- A. granulatus = Pleuroctenium granulatum
- A. hedeni = Lotagnostus hedeni
- A. hirundo = Segmentagnostus hirundo
- A. hoi = Oncagnostus hoi
- A. incertus Brogger, 1878 = Peronopsis (Svenax) scutalis
- A. innocens = Trilobagnostus innocens
- A. interstricta = Itagnostus interstricta
- A. kjerulfi = Linguagnostus kjerulfi
- A. laevigata = Lejopyge laevigata
- A. laiwuensis = Ammagnostus laiwuensis
- A. lautus = Pentagnostus (Meragostus) bonnerensis
- A. lens = Cotalagnostus lens
- A. liaotungensis = Acadagnostus rakuroensis
- A. lingula = Peronopsis (Svenax) lingula
- A. lobatus = Calodiscus lobatus
- A. longifrons = Triplagnostus longifrons
- A. maccoyi = Segmentagnostus hirundo
- A. montis = Peronopsis (Peronopsis) montis
- A. morea = Corrugatagnostus morea
- A. nathorsti = Goniagnostus nathorsti
- A. nodosus = Glyptagnostus reticulatus
- A. nobilis = Weymouthia nobilis
- A. nudus var. marginata = Valenagnostus marginatus
- A. nudus ovalis = Phalagnostus nudus
- A. orientalis = Agnostotes orientalis
- A. ozakii = Ammagnostus laiwuensis
- A. parvifrons = Hypagnostus parvifrons
- A. perrugatus = Corrugatagnostus perrugatus
- A. planicauda = Diplagnostus planicauda
- A. prolongus = Pseudagnostus prolongus
- A. punctuosus = Ptychagnostus punctuosus
- A. pusilla = Peronopsis (Svenax) pusilla
- A. quadrata = Quadragnostus quadrata
- A. rakuroensis = Baltagnostus rakuroensis
- A. repandrus = Clavagnostus repandrus
- A. reticulatus = Glyptagnostus reticulatus
- A. rex = Condylopyge rex
- A. robustus = Itagnostus interstrictus robustus
- A. rotundus = undetermined Hypagnostus
- A. sallessi = Pseudoperonopsis sallessi
- A. scutalis = Peronopsis (Svenax) scutalis scutalis
- A. securiger = Pseudagnostus (Sulcatagnostus) securiger
- A. segmenta = Pentagnostus (Meragostus) segmenta
- A. shandongensis = Ammagnostus laiwuensis
- A. sidenbladhi = Geragnostus sidenbladhi
- A. similaris = Sphaeragnostus similaris
- A. solus = Quadragnostus solus
- A. spitiensis = Peronopsis (Svenax) spitiensis
- A. tenuis = Peronopsis (Svenax) scutalis tenuis
- A. trilobatus = Gratagnostus trilobatus
- A. trisectus = Lotagnostus trisectus
- A. trisectus germanicus = Lotagnostus germanicus
- A. tullbergi = Geragnostus tullbergi
- A. viator = Baltagnostus rakuroensis
- A. vir = Acadagnostus acadica
