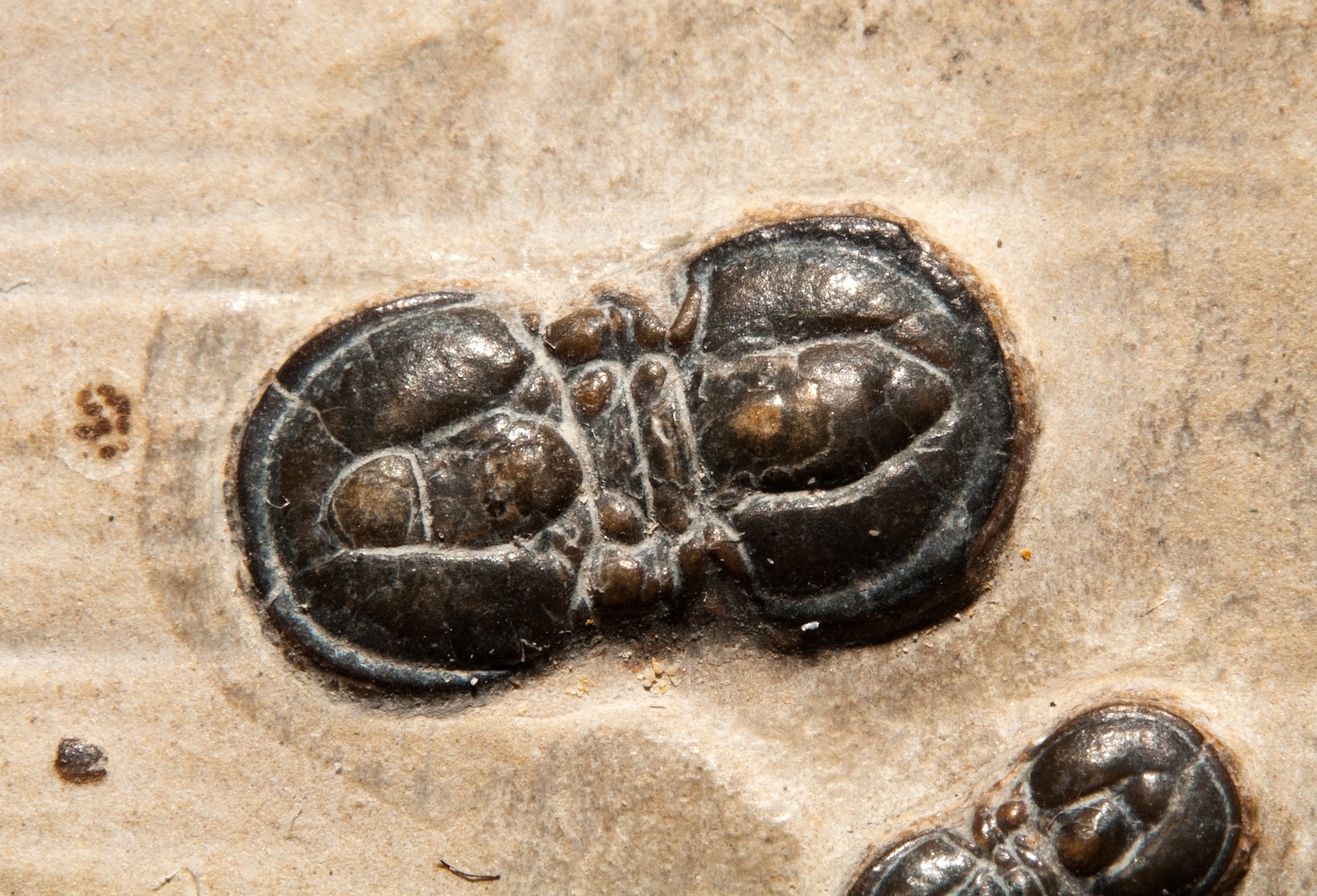

Scientific classification
- Kingdom: Animalia
- Phylum: Arthropoda
- Clade: †Artiopoda
- Class: †Trilobita (?)
- Order: †Agnostida
- Family: †Peronopsidae
- Genus: †Peronopsis; Hawle and Corda, 1847

Subgenera
- Peronopsis (Peronopsis); Peronopsis (Proacadagnostus) Naimark, 2012; Peronopsis (Svenax) Öpik, 1979; Peronopsis (Vulgagnostus) Naimark, 2012; and see text for species

= Peronopsis =

Peronopsis Temporal range: earliest Mayan to earliest Batyrbayan

Genus of trilobites (fossil)

Peronopsis (meaning "broach-like" or possibly "boot-like") is a genus of trilobite restricted to the Middle Cambrian. Its remains have been found in Asia, Australia, Europe, and North America.

== Etymology ==
The subgenus Svenax is a contraction of Sven Axel, the given names of the paleontologist Sven Axel Tullberg.

== Taxonomy ==
=== Position of Peronopsis palmadon ===
Peronopsis palmadon is intermediate between Peronopsidae and Condylopygidae, but it is not clear whether P. palmadon is ancestral to the Condylopigidae, a condylopigid exhibiting regression towards ancestral characters, or an example of parallel evolution.

=== Species previously assigned to Peronopsis ===
- P. acadica = Acadagnostus acadicus
- P. bifidus = Pseudoperonopsis bifidus
- P. bonnerensis = Pentagnostus (Meragostus) bonnerensis
- P. brunfloensis = Redeagnostus brunfloensis
- P. bulkurensis = Pentagnostus (Meragostus) bulkurensis
- P. columbensis = Pseudoperonopsis columbensis
- P. comes Resser and Erdo, 1937 = Ammagnostus laiwuensis
- P. comis Öpik, 1979 = Euagnostus comis
- P. crassa = Ammagnostus crassa
- P. cylindrica = Quadragnostus cylindrica
- P. cylindrata = Ammagnostus laiwuensis
- P. ekip = Ammagnostus laiwuensis
- P. evansi = Archaeagnostus evansi
- P. fallax conica = Quadragnostus conica
- P. fallax depressa = Quadragnostus depressa
- P. fallax sinopsis = Redeagnostus ferox sinopsis
- P. fallax xiaoshiwanensis = indetermined Agnostidae
- P. gaspensis = Itagnostus gaspensis
- P. grossus = Ammagnostus laiwuensis
- P. gullini = Ammagnostus laiwuensis
- P. huzhuensis = indetermined Agnostidae
- P. interstricta = Itagnostus interstrictus
- P. jegorovae = Ammagnostus jegorovae
- P. lata = Diplorrhina lata
- P. marginalis = Baltagnostus marginalis
- P. maijangensis = Archaeagnostus maijangensis
- P. miqueli = Baltagnostus miqueli
- P. munda = Trilobagnostus munda
- P. quadrata sulcata = Quadragnostus sulcata
- P. quadratiformis = Ammagnostus laiwuensis
- P. recta = Diplorrhina recta
- P. roddyi = Eoagnostus roddyi
- P. rotundatus = Quadragnostus rotundatus
- P. segmenta = Pentagnostus (Meragostus) segmenta
- P. shandongensis = Ammagnostus laiwuensis
- P. taitzuhoensis = Itagnostus gaspensis taitzuhoensis
- P. tramitis = Acadagnostus acadicus
- P. ultima Poulsen, 1960 = Clavagnostus ultima
- P. ultimus Ergaliev, 1980 = Pentagnostus (Meragostus) shabaktensis

== Species and distribution ==
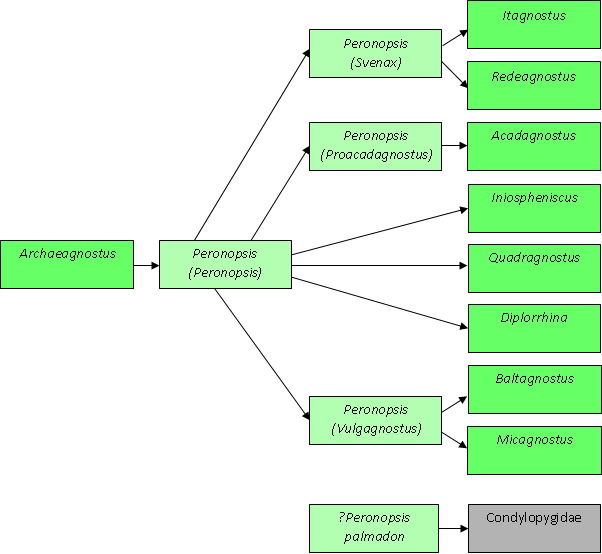
Schematic showing the relationship between the different subgenera of Peronopsis (light green) with other Peronopsid genera (darker green). Unclear is the position of ?Peronopsis palmadon, a transitional form between the agnostoids and the condylopygids.

=== Subgenus Peronopsis (Peronopsis) ===
- P. integra (Beyrich, 1845) (Type), synonyms Battus integer and Mesagnostus integer, is known from the Middle Cambrian of the Czech Republic (Hydrocephalus lyelli-zone and Paradoxides gracilis-zone, Jince Formation, Bohemia) and Sweden (Paradoxides oelandicus-zone, Öland).
- P. amplaxis Robison, 1982 has been found in the Middle Cambrian of Central Asia and North America (Triplagnostus gibbus-zone, Nevada; House Range, Utah; Branche Cove, Newfoundland).
- P. batenica Bognibova, 1971 occurs in the Middle Cambrian of the Russian Federation (Eldakh Horizon, Eldakh Mountain, Betenev Range, Altai).
- P. crassa Lermontova, 1940 is present in the Middle Cambrian of the Russian Federation (Paradoxides forchhammeri-zone, Orlinaya Mountains, Kuznetsk Basin).
- P. deons Jell and Webbers, 1992 has been collected in the Middle Cambrian of Antarctica (Triplagnostus gibbus-zone, Edson Hills, Ellsworth Mountains, West Antarctica).
- P. hypagnostiformis Bognibova, 1971 has been found in the Middle Cambrian of the Russian Federation (Mandybashskii Horizon, Shakhmatovo, East Sayan).
- P. inarmata Hutchinson, 1962 occurs in the Middle Cambrian of Newfoundland, Canada (Paradoxides bennetti-zone, Avalon Peninsula).
- P. montis Matthew, 1889 is known from the Middle Cambrian of the Russian Federation (Kounamkites-zone, Daldyn river Basin, and Nekekit River; Ovatoryctocara-zone, Molodo River, Olenik Uplift, Yakutia; Shistocephalus antiquus-zone, Lena River), and Canada (Mount Stephen, British Columbia; Bathyuriscus-Elrathina-zone, Rocky Mountains).
- P. uzbekistanica Hajrullina, 1970 was excavated from the Middle Cambrian of Uzbekistan (Elrathina poletaevae-zone, Amgaian, South Tien Shan).

=== Subgenus Peronopsis (Proacadagnostus) ===
- P. normata (Whitehouse, 1936) (Type) synonym Diplorrhina normata is recorded from the Middle Cambrian of the Russian Federation (Ovatoryctocara-zone, Molodo River, Olenek uplift, Western Yakutia, Eastern Siberia; Kounamkites-zone, Nekekit River), Scandinavia (Paradoxides oelandicus-zone), England (terminal beds with Paradoxides, Shropshire), Spain (Accadoparadoxides muroensis-zone; Eccaparadoxides sduyi-zone, Valdemiedes Formation), China (Crepicephalina-zone, lower Fu-chou Series, Tchang-hsing-tou Island, Liaotung; Kiu-lung Group, Shan-tung), and Australia (Dinesus-stage, Templetonian River; Xystridura templetonensis-zone, Elkedra, Northern Territory).

=== Subgenus Peronopsis (Svenax) ===
- P. pusillus (Tulberg, 1880) (Type) synonym Agnostus pusillus has been found in the Middle Cambrian of Australia (Ptychagnostus punctuosus-zone, Quita Formation, Northern Territory) and Sweden (Ptychagnostus punctuosus-zone, Andrarum, Gislovshammar and Brantewick).
- P. egenus (Resser & Endo, 1937) is known from the Middle Cambrian of the Russian Federation (Kounamkites-zone, Daldyn River basin, Central Siberia; Tomagnostus fissus-zone, Lena River; Pseuanocarina aojiformis-zone, Buom-Pastach), China (Mapan Formation, Chi-chiachen-tzu, Manchoukuo; Duliujiang Formation, Zhalagou, Sandu, Guizhou), England (Paradoxides hicksi-zone, Abbey Shales, Nuneaton, Warwickshire) and Greenland (Ptychagnostus atavus-zone, Kap Stenton Formation).
- P. eoscutalis Hajrullina, 1970 occurs in the Middle Cambrian of Uzbekistan (Elratina pletaevae-zone, Amgaian, South Tien Shan).
- P. hartshillensis Kobayashi, 1939 has been deposited in the Middle Cambrian of England (Paradoxides hicksi-zone, Nuneaton, Warwickshire).
- P. lingula (Grönwall, 1902) synonym Svenax vafer, is present in the Middle Cambrian of Australia (Doryagnostus notalibre-zone, V-creek Canyon, Northern Territory) and Greenland (Ptychagnostus atavus-zone, Henson Gletscher Formation).
- P. matthewi Hutchinson, 1962 has been found in the Middle Cambrian of England (Paradoxides hicksi-zone, Abbey Shales, Warwickshire) and Canada (Paradoxides davidis-zone, Avalon Peninsula, Newfoundland).
- P. scutalis Hicks, 1872 was recorded originally from the Menevia Formation (Porth-y-rhaw Group) of Rees et al., (2014, p. 72) in the eastern side of Porth-y-rhaw, SW Wales, which is therefore type locality for the species. Subspecies of scutalis include:
  - Peronopsis scutalis scutalis Salter (Hicks, 1872, p. 175, pl. 5 figs 11, 12 [non pl. 1, figs 9, 10, = Ptychagnostus punctuosus (Angelin); nec pl.5, figs, 13, 14, = P. scutalis (s.l.)] from the Hypagnostus parvifrons Biozone and basal Pt. punctuosus Biozone of Porth-y-rhaw and from the parvifrons Biozone exposed behind the lifeboat house, Solva Harbour, St David's;
  - Peronopsis scutalis tenuis (Illing, 1916) from the lower Tomagnostus fissus Biozone in the Abbey Shale Formation of Nuneaton, central England and the coeval lower Menevia Formation of Dwrhyd, Nine Wells, St David's;
  - Peronopsis scutalis exarata (Grönwall, 1902, p. 77, pl. 1 fig 17), described originally from the Biozones of Hypagnostus parvifrons and Paradoxides davidis in Bornholm, and occurring also in the same Biozones at Porth-y-rhaw.

P. scutalis s.l. Salter, is recorded also from the Middle Cambrian of the Russian Federation (Mandybashskii horizon, Dolgii mys mountain, Betenev range; Tomagnostus fissus Zone, Lena River; Kounamkites Zone, Nekekit River, Khorbusuonka River, and Daldyno-Alakitshii District; Pseudanomocarina aojiformis zone, Hormustah District), Australia (Triplagnostus gibbus Zone, Sandover Beds early, Northern Territory); Greenland (Ptychagnostus atavus Zone, Henson Gletscher Formation; P. punctuosus Zone, Nyebö, North Greenland; Lejopyge laevigata Zone, Holm Dal Formation), Canada (Ptychagnostus atavus Zone, Saint John Formation; Paradoxides abenacus Zone, Saint Martin; both New Brunswick; P. hicksi Zone, Deep Cove, Newfoundland), Sweden (Ptychagnostus punctuosus Zone, Andrarum, Gislovshammar and Brantevik; Solenopleura s.l. brachymetopa Zone, Andrarum) and Italy (Gonnesa Formation, Sardinia). P. scutalis s.l. is also recorded from the Ford Beds, H. parvifrons Biozone, of Ford railway station, Pembrokeshire, SW Wales, described by Thomas & Jones (1912).

- P. spitiensis (Reed, 1910) has been collected from the Middle Cambrian of India (Parahio Horizon, Changnu, Himalayas).

=== Subgenus Peronopsis (Vulgagnostus) ===
- P. longinqua Öpik, 1979 (Type) has been excavated from the Middle Cambrian of Australia (Templetonian-zone, Sandover Bedsearly, Northern Territory) and the Russian Federation (lower Pseudanomocarina-zone, Homustah District, Amga River; Kounamkites-zone, Nekekit River).
- P. gedongensis Huang and Yuan, 1994 synonym P. pseudointerstrictus is recorded from the Middle Cambrian of China (Middle part of the Kaili Formation, Taijiang County, Guizhou), Sweden (Andrarum; Paradoxides oelandicus-zone, Mossberga, Öland) and the Russian Federation (Kounamkites-zone, Lena River).
- P. prolixa (Öpik, 1979) occurs in the Middle Cambrian of Australia (Triplagnostus gibbus-zone, Sandover Bedsearly, Northern Territory).
- P. guoleensis Sun, 1989 is present in the Middle Cambrian of China (Inouyops-zone, Hsuchuang Formation, Guole, Inner Mongolia).
- P. taijiangensis is found in the Middle Cambrian of China (Oryctocephalus indicus-zone, Upper Kaili Formation, Taijiang County, Guizhou) and the Russian Federation (lower Pseudanomocarina-zone, Homustah District, Amga River).

=== Unrevised species ===
These species may be assigned to one of the subgenera later or be reassigned to another genus.

- P. clarae Howell, 1925
- P. coreanus Kobayashi, 1935
- P. howelli Hutchinson, 1962
- P. magezhuangensis Zhang and Wang, 1985
- P. ovalis Zhou, 1982
- P. palmadon Kordule and Šnajdr, 1979
- P. rectangularis Howell, 1925
- P. sayramhuensis Zhang, 1981
- P. sinensis Yang and Liu
- P. triangula Lin and Zhang, 1979
- P. xichuanensis Yang
