= Tullberg =

Tullberg may also refer to:

== People ==
- Mike Tullberg (born 1985), Danish footballer
- Sven Axel Tullberg (1852–1886), Swedish botanist

== Other uses ==
- Tullberg's woodpecker, bird specues
