= Yukoniidae =

Yukoniidae Temporal range: Atdabanian to Toyonian

Scientific classification
- Kingdom: Animalia
- Phylum: Arthropoda
- Clade: †Artiopoda
- Class: †Trilobita (?)
- Order: †Agnostida
- Suborder: †Eodiscina
- Superfamily: †Eodiscoidea
- Family: †Yukoniidae; S. Zhang, 1980

Genera
- Alaskadiscus S. Zhang in W. Zhang, Lu et al., 1980; Egyngolia Korobov, 1980 (Atdabanian); Ekwipagetia Fritz, 1973 (Atdabanian); Lenadiscus Repina in Khomentovskii & Repina, 1965 (Botomian); Yukonia Palmer, 1968; Yukonides Fritz, 1972 (Atdabanian)

Extinct family of trilobites

Yukoniidae S. Zhang, 1980 [nom. transl. et emend. Jell, in Whittington et al., 1997 ex Yukoniinae S. Zhang in W. Zhang, Lu et al., 1980] is a small family of trilobites, belonging to the Eodiscina.

== Type genus and species ==
Yukonia intermedia Palmer 1968 (Plate 2, figures 14, 17–19, 22, 23, 27, 28; text figure 4).

== Taxonomy ==
The Yukoniidae probably descended from the Tsunyidiscidae and gave rise to the Eodiscidae.

== Description ==
Yukoniidae are typically isopygous, belonging to the Superfamily Eodiscoidea. The narrow glabella is usually parallel sided, anteriorly rounded and separated from smooth anterior border by broad (sag.) preglabellar field which occupies about 25% of cephalic length excluding occipital spine. Posterior glabellar furrows are reduced to a pair of slits low on sides of glabella and directed backwards. Occipital ring bears a strong backwardly directed spine. Yukonia intermedia Palmer (1968) has three thoracic segments, the anterior of which has strong backwardly directed pleural spines. Pygidium of Yukoniidae has an axis of three to seven rings.
