= Calodiscidae =

Calodiscidae Temporal range: Lower Cambrian

Scientific classification
- Domain: Eukaryota
- Kingdom: Animalia
- Phylum: Arthropoda
- Class: †Trilobita (?)
- Order: †Agnostida
- Suborder: †Eodiscina
- Superfamily: †Eodiscoidea
- Family: †Calodiscidae; Kobayashi, 1943

Genera
- Calodiscus; Korobovia; Neocobboldia; Pseudocobboldia; Sinodiscus

Synonyms
- Brevidiscinae; Neocobboldinae

Family of trilobites

The Calodiscidae Kobayashi, 1943 [nom. transl. Öpik, 1975 ex Calodiscinae Kobayashi, 1943] are a family of trilobites belonging to the order Agnostida that lived during the Lower Cambrian (Botomian and Toyonian). They are small or very small, and have a thorax of two or three segments. The Calodiscidae includes five genera (see box).

== Taxonomy ==
The probable ancestors of the Calodiscidae are among the Tsunyidiscidae. The Calodiscidae had no descendants.

== Description ==
Like all Agnostida, the Calodiscidae are diminutive and the headshield (or cephalon) and tailshield (or pygidium) are of approximately the same size (or isopygous) and outline. The central raised area of the cephalon (or glabella) has parallel sides or tapers forward, the front being rounded and expanded, and may be divided by transverse glabellar furrows. The occipital ring is defined by a complete transverse furrow and is neither spinose nor expanded. When present, the eye lobes are short and prominent. The thorax is only known in Chelediscus (two segments) and Sinodiscus (three segments). The pygidium has a wide, tapering axis of less than six segments.
