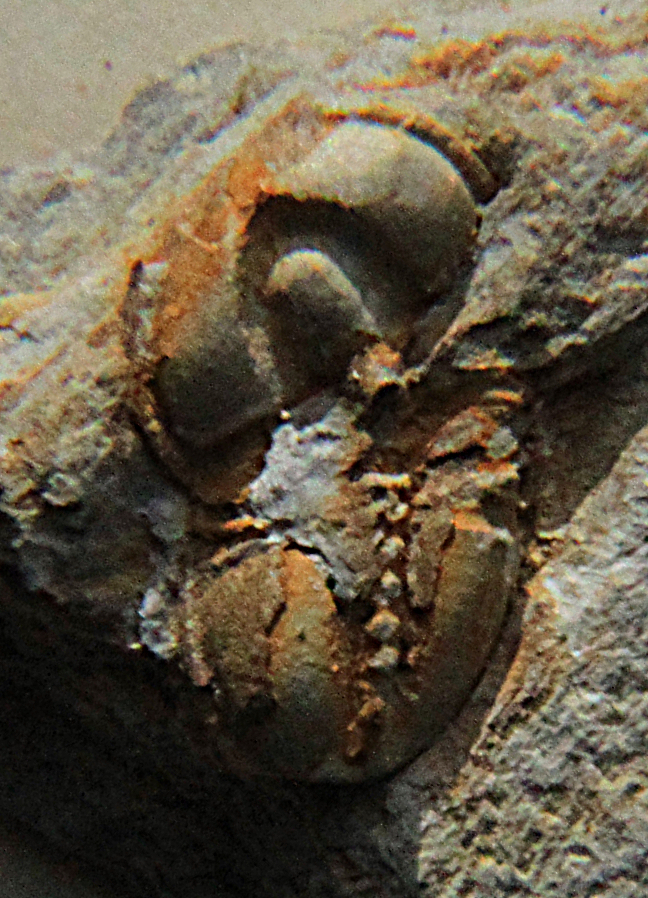
- Internal mould of Eodiscus punctatus scanicus, 8mm in length. collected from the lower part of the Menevia Formation (Mid Cambrian Drumian Stage), Mawddachites hicksi Biozone, of Dwrhyd near Nine Wells on the St David's Peninsula, SW Wales.

Scientific classification
- Kingdom: Animalia
- Phylum: Arthropoda
- Clade: †Artiopoda
- Class: †Trilobita (?)
- Order: †Agnostida
- Suborder: †Eodiscina; Kobayashi, 1939
- Superfamily: †Eodiscoidea; Raymond, 1913

Families
- Calodiscidae; Eodiscidae; Hebediscidae; Tsunyidiscidae; Weymouthiidae; Yukoniidae

= Eodiscina =

Eodiscina Temporal range: Lower and Middle Cambrian

Suborder of agnostid trilobites

Eodiscina is trilobite suborder. The Eodiscina first developed near the end of the Lower Cambrian period (late Atdabanian) and became extinct at the end of the Middle Cambrian. Species are tiny to small, and have a thorax of two or three segments. Eodiscina includes six families classified under one superfamily, Eodiscoidea.

== Taxonomy ==
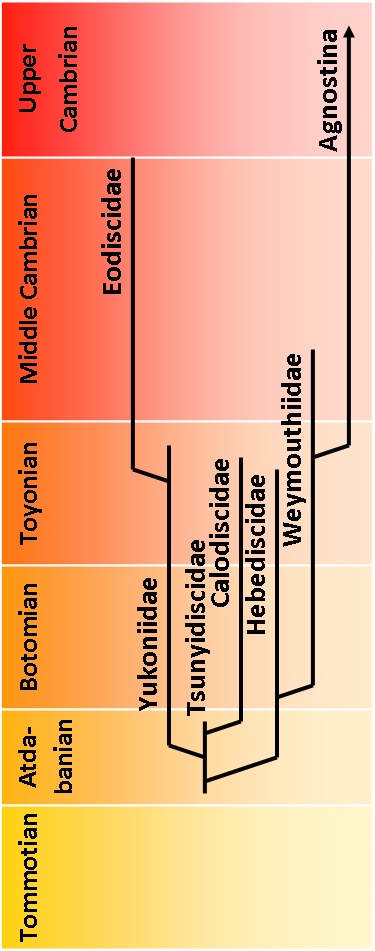
Cladogram of the relations between the families of the Eodiscina, according to Jell, 1975

The Eodiscina are mostly considered the more primitive suborder of the Agnostida, and the Agnostina the more advanced. Some scholars do not consider the Agnostina true trilobites, and consequently rejected the idea that they were related to the Eodiscina. Consequently, these scientists have proposed to elevate the group to ordinal level, which would thus be called Eodiscida Kobayashi, 1939.

=== Origin ===
The oldest known eodiscoid is Tsunyidiscus. The glabella of Tsunyidiscus is extremely similar to that of Dipharus clarki, and distinct from all other eodiscoids. D. clarki is thought to represent an immature stage of the redlichioid Bulaiaspis rather than an eodiscoid. This is because of the dominant palpebroocular ridges, extremely long librigenae, and free pleural tips on the pygidium of variable numbers of segments. In short: Tsunyidiscus has probably developed through paedomorphosis from Bulaiaspis. Alternatively Sinodiscus changyangensis has been considered the most primitive of the Eodiscina.

Many characters that are divergent from other trilobites may be explained by paedomorphosis, such as the small number of thorax segments and proparian facial sutures, that occur in all trilobites during larval development, while the Eodiscoid abathochroal eye is not unlike early development stages of the holochroal eye, where lenses are also separated.

=== Relations within the Agnostida ===
Three lineages are thought to have evolved from the monotypical family Tsunyidiscidae. First the Calodiscidae. Second the Yukoniidae, who sprouted the Eodiscidae. And finally the Hebediscidae, that themselves gave rise to the Weymouthiidae, which contain Tannudiscus, the probable ancestor of the peronopsid genus Archaeagnostus, the earliest of the Agnostina.

=== Differences with some other simplified trilobites ===
Agnostina and a few other trilobites also have very few thorax segments. All Agnostina lack eyes and only have two thorax segments, characters they share with some of the later Eodiscina. Eodiscina however always have an articulating half-ring. This seals the opening in the axis between cephalon and the anterior thorax segment that is created when the animal was enrolled. Agnostida do not have an articulating half-ring, resulting in an opening between the thorax and the cephalon when enrolled, called cephalothoracic aperture. Thoracocare (Corynexochida) has only two thoracic segments at maturity, but has a very wide subquadrate glabella that touches the frontal border along its entire width and lacks a pygidial border. Taklamakania, Pseudampyxina and Nanshanaspis (Raphiophoridae) have 3 thorax segments, but with subtriangular cephalon and pygidium, genal spines, and Taklamakania with a frontal glabellar spine.

== Description ==
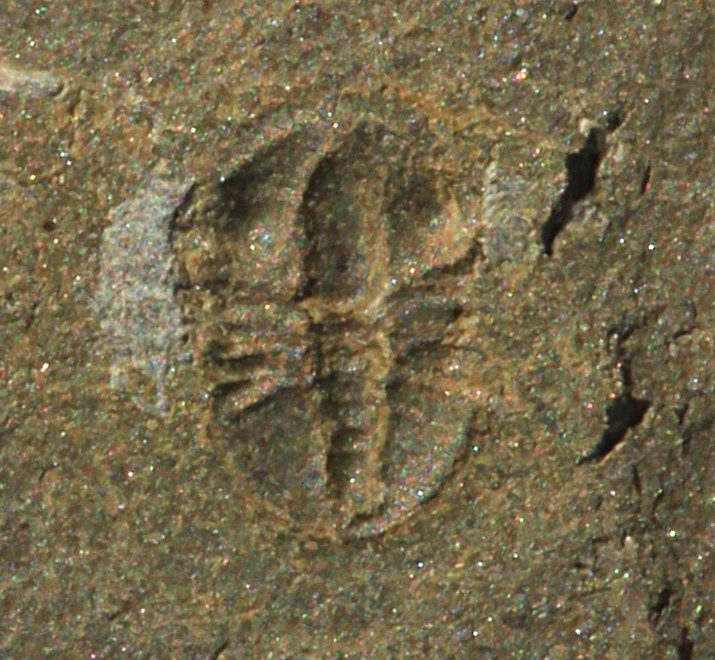
Pagetia taijiangensis, 3mm, from Kaili, Guizhou, China

Like all Agnostida, members of the Eodiscina are relatively small and isopygous with the cephalon and pygidium of approximately similar size and outline. Thorax consisting of two or three fulcrate segments. Cephalon strongly parabolic in outline with maximum width (tr.) usually anterior to genal angle and either occulate or lacking eyes. The border is convex. Hypostome is natant. Rostral plate is lacking or uncalcified. Facial sutures are present in early Eodiscina, but are lost in some later representatives. When present, the facial sutures are proparian. Outline of the pygidium closely matches that of the cephalon, is usually segmented, with axis almost extending to the border, and in some species the pleural region is segmented. Examples of the protaspid growth stage are known in a few species.

=== Eye ===
If present, the eyes of Eodiscina are unique among trilobites. They have up to 70 small lenses per eye, not touching but separated from each other by the so-called interlensar sclera. Each lens has an individual cornea, that is limited to the lens surface. The interlensar sclera is not deeper than the lenses. This type of eye is called abathochroal. A second type of eye, called schizochroal, is unique to the Phacopina suborder, and has up to several hundreds of relatively large lenses (0.05-0.5 mm), that do not touch either, but the corneal membrane extends into the sclera outside the lens, and the sclera is deeper than the lens. The most usual type of trilobite eye, called holochroal, has usually thousands of small hexagonal lenses without an interlensar sclera, and a common cornea. Many later Eodiscina however, lost their visual organs altogether, and this may have resulted from living in an environment with very low visibility.
