= Diplorrhina =

Diplorrhina Temporal range: early Middle Cambrian earliest Amgan to latest Mayan

Scientific classification
- Kingdom: Animalia
- Phylum: Arthropoda
- Clade: †Artiopoda
- Class: †Trilobita (?)
- Order: †Agnostida
- Family: †Peronopsidae
- Genus: †Diplorrhina; Hawle & Corda, 1847

Species
- D. triplicata Hawle & Corda, 1847 (type); D. cuneifera (Barrande, 1846) synonyms Battus cuneiferus, Peronopsis cuneifera; D. lata (Shabanov, 1972) synonym Peronopsis lata; D. redita Pek et Vanĕk, 1971; D. recta (Pokrovskaya et Jegorova, 1972) synonym Peronopsis recta

Synonyms
- Mesospheniscus

Extinct genus of trilobites

Diplorrhina Hawle and Corda (1847) is a genus of trilobite belonging to Order Agnostida. It lived during the early Middle Cambrian (Amgan and Mayan stages) in what are now the Czech Republic and the North Siberian plateau. as in members of the family Peronopsidae it lacks a preglabellar furrow. Both cephalon and pygidium lack spines. It is difficult to distinguish Diplorrhina from many other peronopsids.

== Taxonomy ==
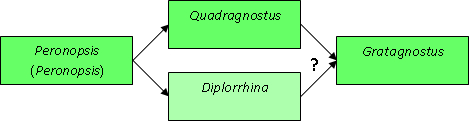
Schematic showing the relationship between the genus Diplorrhina (light green) with other Peronopsid genera (darker green).

The ancestor of Diplorrhina is most likely one of the Siberian species of the genus Archaeagnostus. D. recta is the most primitive species and it gave rise to D. cuneifera, which was in turn ancestral to Diplorrhina triplicata.

=== Species previously assigned to Diplorrhina ===
- D. normata = Peronopsis (Proacadagnostus) normata
- D. spitiensis = Peronopsis (Svenax) spitiensis

== Distribution ==
- D. triplicata is known from the early Middle Cambrian of the Czech Republic (Eccaparadoxides pusillus and P. gracilisZones, Skryje Beds, pod hruskou, near Tyrovice and near Ginetz).
- D. cuneifera has been collected from the early Middle Cambrian of the Czech Republic (Eccaparadoxides pusillusZone Skryje Beds, near Tyrovice)
- D. redita occurs in the early Middle Cambrian of the Czech Republic (Paradoxides gracilis Zone, Jince Formation). Agnostus cambrensis Harkness & Hicks (1871, p. 390) was identified by Lake (1906, p. 18) as Agnostus integer Beyrich (now Peronopsis integra), but re-examination of this specimen shows it to be referable to Diplorrhina redita (Pek & Vanĕk 1971, p.274, pl.1, figs. 4 & 5). The species was placed in Peronopsis by Rees et al., (2014, p. 73). From upper part of the Whitesands Bay Formation (Rees et al., 1914 p. 72), lower T. fissus Biozone.
- D. recta was recovered from the early Middle Cambrian of Eastern Siberia (Ovatoryctocara Zone, Molodo River, Olenek Uplift, and Kounamkite-zone, Nekekit River and Amidai River, all Western Jakutia).
- D. lata is found in the Middle Cambrian of Eastern Siberia (Kounamkites Zone, Nekekit River).

== Description ==
Both border and border furrow of the cephalon are relatively narrow. The transglabellar furrow is straight or curved slightly towards posterior. The posterior glabellar lobe is parallel sided, has two pairs of lateral furrows and small basal lobes; there is no median node. The pygidial border is flattened and wide with posterolateral angles, but no spines. The pygidal lobes reach the median node but do not cross the axis. The distance between the pygidial axis and border furrow is short or sometimes touching.

=== Differences with Peronopis ===
Diplorrhina differs from members of the subgenus Peronopsis (Peronopsis) in the better developed transaxial furrows, better developed lateral furrows of the glabella, larger basal lobes, and in the trend towards the formation of a transverse depression of the axis.
