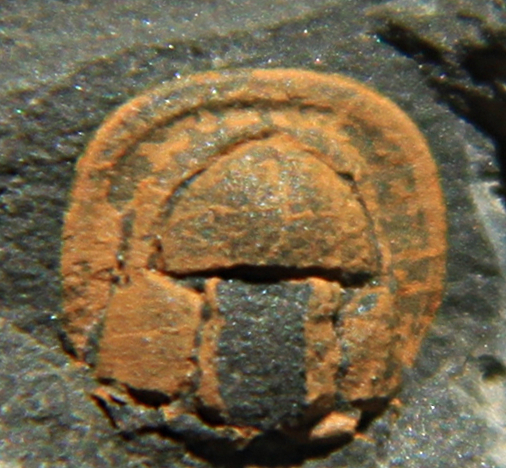

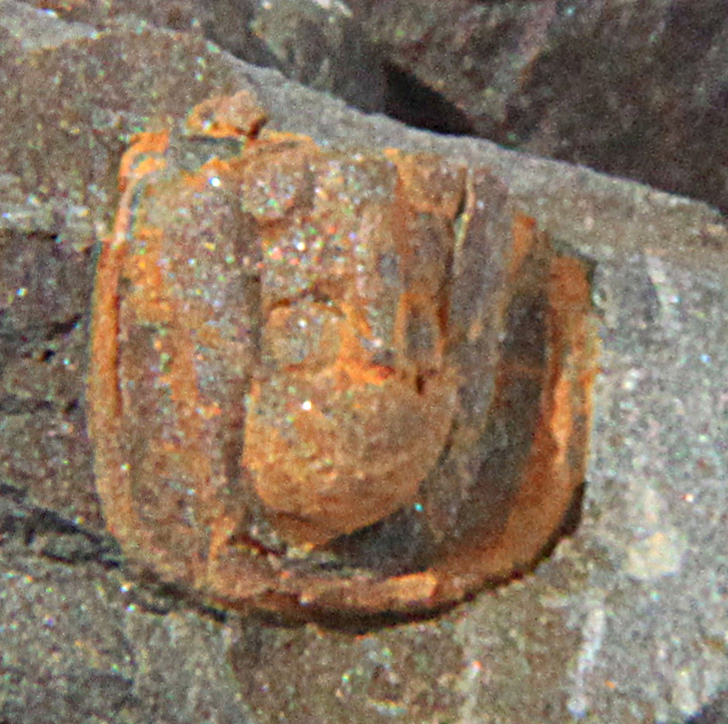
- Cephalon (top) and pygidium (bottom) of Condylopyge rex

Scientific classification
- Kingdom: Animalia
- Phylum: Arthropoda
- Clade: †Artiopoda
- Class: †Trilobita (?)
- Order: †Agnostida
- Family: †Condylopygidae
- Genus: †Condylopyge; Hawle & Corda, 1847

Species
- C. rex (Barrande, 1846) (type) synonyms Battus rex, Agnostus rex; C. amitina Rushton, 1966; C. antiqua Elicki & Pillola, 2004; C. imperator Howell, 1935; C. blayaci (Howell, 1935) synonym Fallagnostus blayaci; C. globosa (Illing, 1916); C. carinata Westergård, 1936; C. cruzensis Liñan & Gozalo, 1986; C. eli Geyer, 1998; C. matutina Dean, 2005; C. regia (Sjögren, 1872); C. aff. regia (Sjögren, 1872); C. spinigera Westergård, 1944; C. vicina Egorova in Savitsky et al., 1972; C. cambrensis Hicks (in Harkness and Hicks, 1871), probably a senior synonym of C. carinata Westergård, 1936

Synonyms
- Paragnostus; Fallagnostus

= Condylopyge =

Condylopyge Temporal range: latest Lower to early Middle Cambrian (Toyonian to Mayaian)

Genus of trilobites

Condylopyge is a genus of agnostid trilobite that lived during the late Lower and early Middle Cambrian, in what are today Canada (Newfoundland and New Brunswick), the Czech Republic, England and Wales, France, Germany, Italy, Morocco, the Russian Federation (North-East Siberia), Spain, Turkey and Sweden. It can easily be distinguished from all other Agnostida because the frontal glabellar lobe is notably wider than the rear lobe. It belongs to the same family as Pleuroctenium but the frontal glabellar lobe does not fold around the rear lobe, as it does in that genus. Condylopyge is long ranging, possibly spanning the early Cambrian Terreneuvian Series in Nuneaton, central England into at least Drumian strata (middle stage of the Miaolingian Series) at various locations elsewhere.

== Description ==
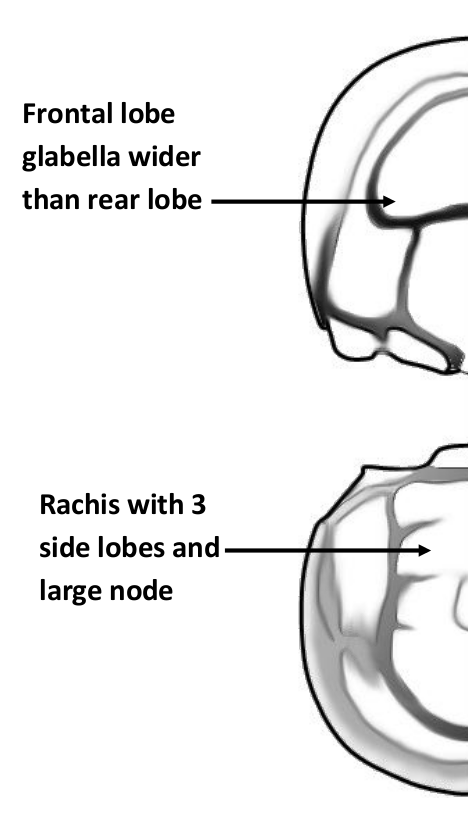

Condylopyge is isopygous with cephalon and pygidium of approximately equal size. The characteristic lateral expansion of the frontal glabellar lobe, occipital structures, and pygidial axis with three pairs of lateral lobes and a terminal piece differentiate Condylopygidae from all other agnostids. The presence of a spine on the occipital band has been recognised as a distinctive feature of condylopygoids (Rushton 1966: p. 29). Condylopyge is easily distinguished from its sister taxon, Pleuroctenium, because the frontal glabellar lobe does not extend partially around the posterior glabellar lobe. Furthermore the frontal glabellar lobe is never bisected medially as in Pleuroctenium. The pygidium may carry a pair of backwardly directed spines, but this also occurs regularly in Pleuroctenium.

== Distribution ==
- C. eli, was originally collected from the Jbel Wawrmast Formation, Bou Tiouit section, at 51.1 m, in Morocco, Morocconus notabilis Zone. Holotype pygidium refigured by Geyer & Vincent (2014, p. 384, fig. 9D).
- C. antiqua was recovered from the latest Lower to the early Middle Cambrian of Italy (Campo Pisano Formation, 4 km south-east of Fluminimaggiore, Iglesiente area, South-West Sardinia).
- C. amitina From the Purley Shale Formation (c. 450' above base), Camp Hill, St. Paul's Church, Stockingford, Nuneaton, Warwickshire, England [Closest ICS interval: Cambrian Series 3 – Terreneuvian (521–541.0 Ma).
- C. imperator and C. blayaci were found in the early Middle Cambrian Couloma Formation of France (Paradoxides beds, Herault, Languedoc).
- C. carinata is present in the early Middle Cambrian of Morocco (A. birameus beds, Tissafin stage, Jbel Wawrmast Formation, Feijas internes group, Touchagt near Tinedjad, in the North of Alnif). The species, originally described by Westergård (1936) from the Mossberga Borehole in Öland, Sweden, occurs also in Borgholm on the same island and possibly in Wales as C. cambrensis (Rees et al., p.12).
- P. cruzensis has been identified from the early Middle Cambrian of Spain (Acadoparadoxides mureroensis trilobite zone, Valdemiedes Formation, Aragon).
- C. matutina is present in the Middle Cambrian of Turkey (Çal Tepe Formation, near Seydişehir, Central Taurides).
- C. globosa was collected from the Abbey Shale Formation (horizon C2), Tomagnostus fissus Biozone of Hartshill Hayes, near Nuneaton, Warwickshire, England.
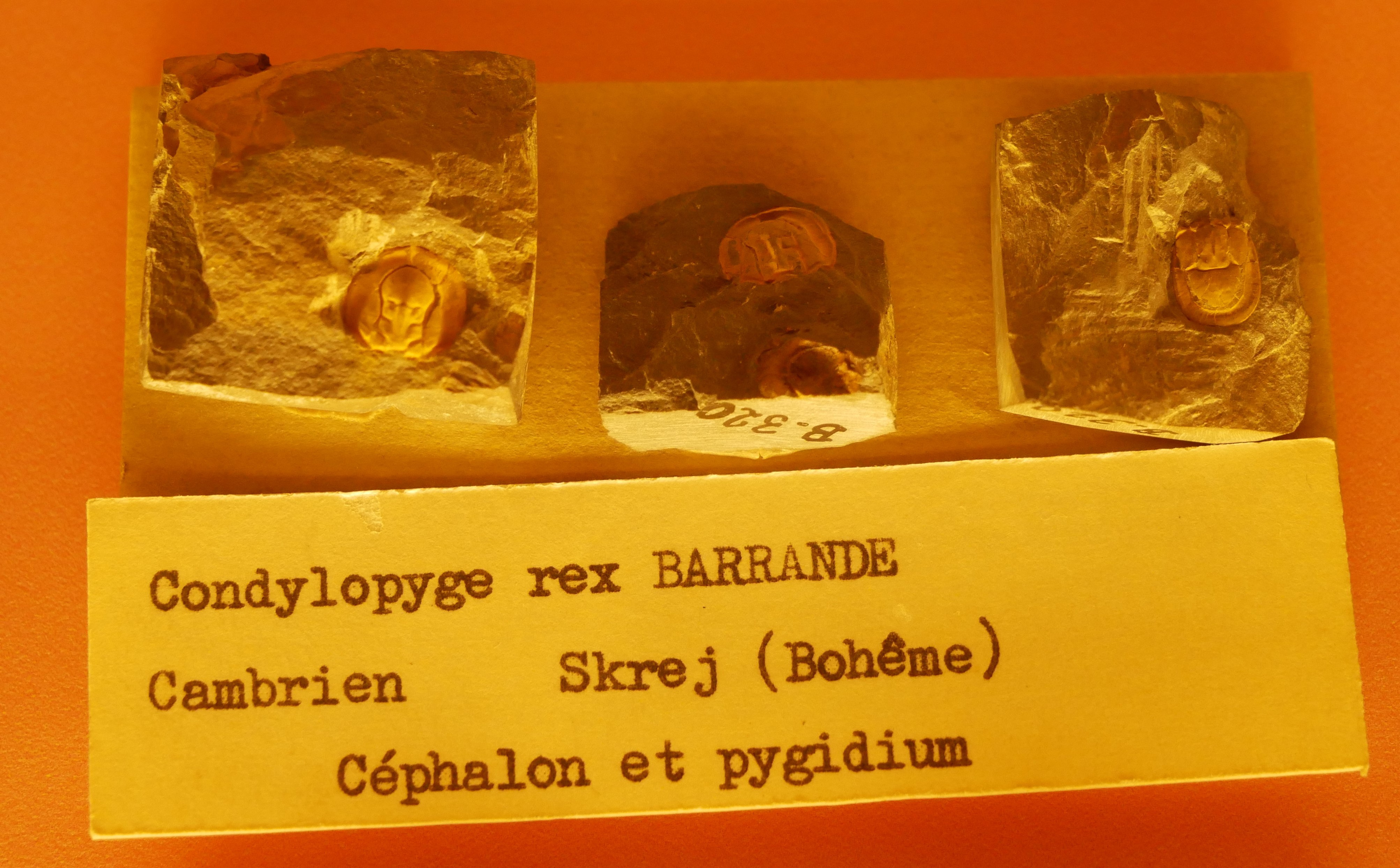
- Condylopyge rex, Muséum National d'Histoire Naturelle.
  C. rex has been collected from the early Middle Cambrian of the Czech Republic (E. pusillus-zone, Týřovice an Skryje, Bohemia), and Spain (Badulesia-zone, Los Villares Formation, Sierra de Córdoba). Illing (1916) recorded this species from the Abbey Shale Formation (horizons A4 - D3) at Hartshill Hayes, near Nuneaton. Condylopyge cf. rex is recorded from Locs, CF - 2 and PR - 4 of Rees et al. (2014) and from within the Drumian Biozones of Tomagnostus fissus and Hypagnostus parvifrons, in the Menevia Formation of SW Wales, respectively.
- C. regia occurs in the Baltoparadoxides oelandicus Biosuperzone (in Öland confined to the zone of Eccaparadoxides insularis). - Öland: Borgholm; Mossbega (boring); Stora Frö; Torp, parish of Böda (boulder). Jämtland: Brunflo (boulder). Fairly infrequent in Öland and rare in Jämtland.
- C. aff. regia was found close to Viken, a hamlet near the north-east corner of Näkten, 14 km SW of Brunflo and 20 km south of Östersund, Jämtland (locs. 1-3 of Rushton and Weidner, 2007, pl. 1, Figs 1-4).
- Condylopyge spinigera is recorded from the Zone of Ptychagnostus s.l. atavus at Brantevik (boulder 8o); basal layer of the zone of Pt. (Pt.) punctuosus and probably also the former zone at Andrarum (boring), Scania. - Rare (Westergärd 1946, pp 33, 34, pl. 2, figs. 3 - 8).
- C. cambrensis is recorded from the Trwyncynddeiriog headland located 1.3 km SSW of St David’s Cathedral and 500 m east of Porth Clais Harbour in SW Wales; The fauna is of late Baltoparadoxides oelandicus [B. pinus] Biosubzone age); Newgale Formation, Pen-y-Cyfrwy Member (of Rees et al., 2014). Known examples of this species cannot be distinguished from C. carinata and cambrensis may in fact be a senior synonym of carinata (Rees et al., op. cit., p 12).
- C. sp. occurs in the early Middle Cambrian of the United States (Chamberlain's Brook Formation, Braintree Member, Hayward's Quarry, Massachusetts).
- C. sp. also occurs in the early Middle Cambrian of Spain (Solenopleuropsis thorali trilobite zone, Genestosa Member, Oville Formation, Los Barrios de Luna, León).
- C. carinata vicina Egorova in Savitsky et al. (1972) is from the Cambrian Judomian–Olenetsky type section in the Kuonamsky Complex deposits, Siberian Platform, Russia.
- C. sp.? Material tentatively assigned to Condylopyge has been reported from the Leny Limestone of Perthshire, Scotland by Fletcher & Rushton (2007) who suggested that the species appears to occur also in the Kounamkites Zone of the River Nekekit area, Siberia, and figured by Egorova & Savitsky (1976, pl. 50, fig. 12) as “Condylopyge carinata vicina”.
