= Korobovia =

Korobovia Temporal range: Late Botomian

Scientific classification
- Domain: Eukaryota
- Kingdom: Animalia
- Phylum: Arthropoda
- Class: †Trilobita (?)
- Order: †Agnostida
- Family: †Calodiscidae
- Genus: †Korobovia; Korovnikov, 2007

Species
- K. ocellata Jell, 1990 type species; K. khorbosuonica Korovnikov, 2007

Extinct genus of trilobites

Korobovia Korovnikov, 2007, is an extinct genus from a well-known class of fossil marine arthropods, the trilobites. It lived during the later part of the Botomian stage, which lasted from approximately 524 to 518.5 million years ago. This faunal stage was part of the Cambrian Period.

== Etymology ==
The genus has been named after the Russian paleontologist M. N. Korobov. The species epithet khorbosuonica refers to the Khorbosuonka River (a tributary of the Olenyok River), in the vicinity of which fossils of this species have been found.
