= Sven Axel Tullberg =

Swedish botanist, palaeontologist and geologist

Sven Axel Theodore Tullberg (27 February 1852 – 15 December 1886) was a Swedish botanist, palaeontologist and geologist. The subgenus Svenax derived its name from a contraction of Sven Axel, the given names of Tullberg.

== Biography ==
Tullberg was born at Landskrona in Skåne County, Sweden. Tullberg studied geology at Lund University from 1871 and became a professor in 1880. He worked as an assistant geologist from 1879 and as geologist and palaeontologist at the Geological Survey of Sweden from 1881. Initially, he focused on botanical subjects including the genus Ranunculus and published Öfversigt af de skandinaviska arterna af slägtet Ranunculus (1873). Together with J. Eriksson, he contributed to the Skåne flora in Bidrag till Skånes flora (1873) and wrote about the genus Primula in Om några på Möen förekommande Primulaformer (1876).

Then he focused on palaeontology and geology, especially the Silurian deposits in Skåne. His first palaeontological work was about the species of the genus Agnostus near Andrarum. Later he studied graptolites from both paleontological and stratigraphic perspective.

== Selected works ==
Publications included: "Some Didymograplus Species in Lower Graptolite Crime at Kivik's Esperöd" (1880), "Trenne New Graptolisms" (1880), "On The Graptolites Described by Hisinger and the Older Swedish Authors" (1882), "Skåne's Graptolites: I. General overcrowding of the Silurian foundations in Skåne etc. " (1882), "II. Graptolite faunas in the Cordiolaskiffern and Cyrtograptusskiffrarna" (1883) and the "Schichtfolge des Silur in Schonen" in Zeitschrift der Deutschen geologischen Gesellschaft '35' (1883). Other works of stratigraphic and palaeontological content describe the layeredness in Cambodia and Silure at Rostanga (1880) and reports of geological tours on Öland (1882). He further described the fossils of the Jurassic collected by Adolf Erik Nordenskiöld on Nova Zembla in "Über Versteinerangen aus den Aucellschichten Noraja Zemljas" (1881), describing marine molluscs from the Hörs sandstone and depicting the geological charts (with Gustaf Linnarsson).
