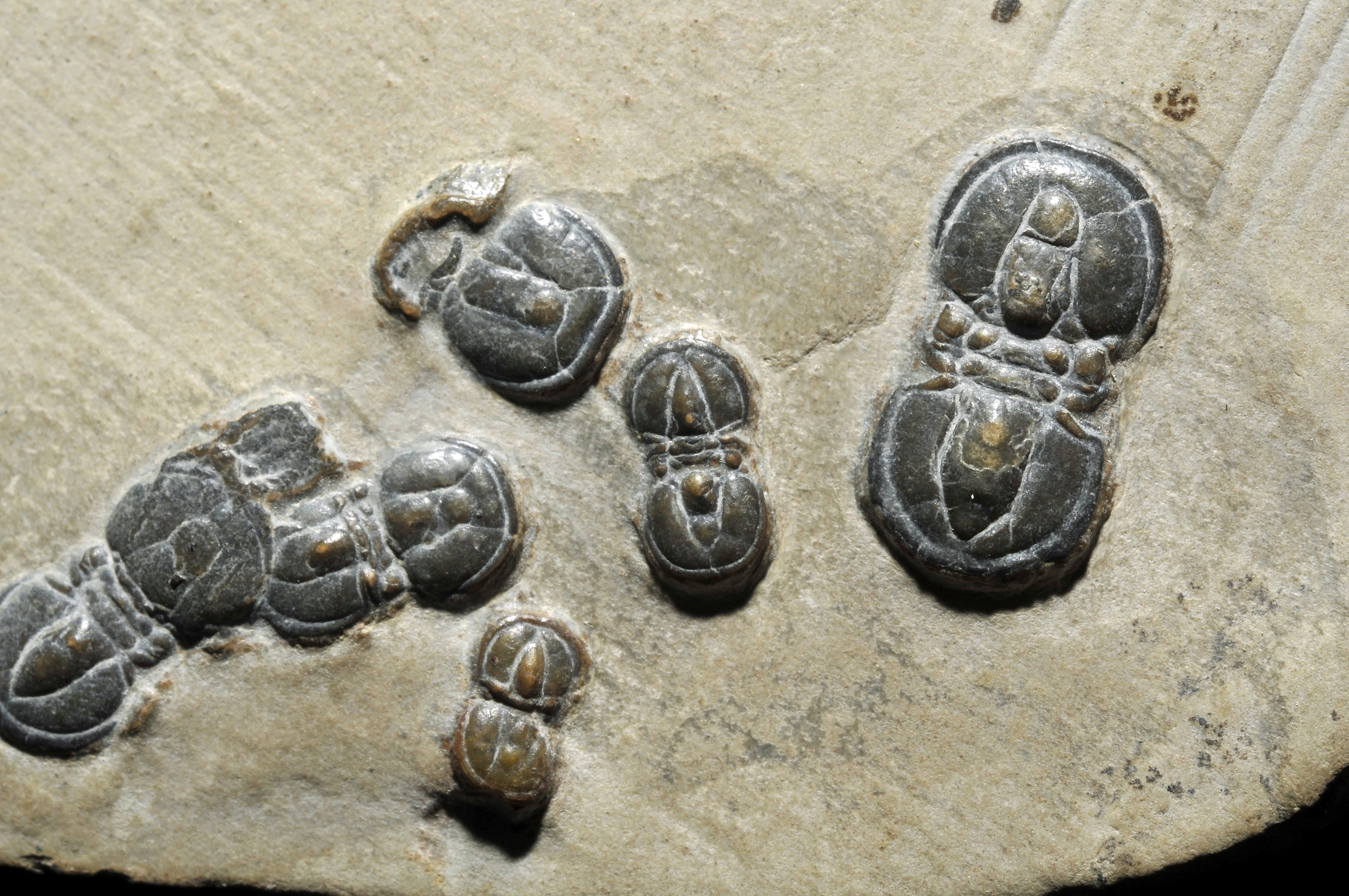
- Itagnostus interstrictus, until recently known as Peronopsis interstricta, from the Wheeler Shale, Utah

Scientific classification
- Domain: Eukaryota
- Kingdom: Animalia
- Phylum: Arthropoda
- Class: †Trilobita (?)
- Order: †Agnostida
- Suborder: †Agnostina
- Superfamily: †Agnostoidea
- Family: †Peronopsidae; Westergård, 1936

Genera
- Acadagnostus; Archaeagnostus; Baltagnostus; Diplorrhina; Eoagnostus; Gratagnostus; Iniosheniscus; Itagnostus; Micagnostus; Pentagnostus; Peronopsis; Peronopsella; Quadragnostus; Redeagnostus

Synonyms
- Archaeagnostinae; Quadragnostinae

= Peronopsidae =

Peronopsidae Temporal range: Cambrian Series 2 to Furongian

Extinct family of trilobites

The Peronopsidae (which may also be called peronopsids) comprise the earliest family of the Agnostina suborder. Species of this family occurred on all paleocontinents. The earliest representatives of this family first occur just before the start of the Middle Cambrian, and the last disappeared just after the start of the Upper Cambrian.

== Distribution ==
Peronopsidae are cosmopolitan.

=== Temporal distribution ===
Temporal distribution:

- Archaeagnostus, Toyonian (Nephrolenellus multinodus-zone) and Amgaian (Ovatoryctocara-zone).
- Eoagnostus, Toyonian (Nephrolenellus multinodus-zone) and Amgaian (Ovatoryctocara-zone).
- Peronopsis (Proacadagnostus), Amgaian (Ovatoryctocara- and lower Kounamkites-zones).
- Diplorrhina, Amgaian (Ovatoryctocara- and Kounamkites-zones)
- Peronopsis (Peronopsis), Amgaian (Ovatoryctocara-, Kounamkites- and Triplagnostus gibbus-zones).
- Pentagnostus (Pentagnostus), Amgaian (Ovatoryctocara-, Kounamkites- and Triplagnostus gibbus-zones).
- Pentagnostus (Meragnostus), Amgaian (Kounamkites- and Triplagnostus gibbus-zones).
- Peronopsis (Vulgagnostus), Amgaian (Kounamkites-, Triplagnostus gibbus- and T. fissus/Ptychagnostus atavus-zones).
- Itagnostus, Amgaian (Kounamkites-, Triplagnostus gibbus- and T. fissus/Ptychagnostus atavus-zones) to Mayanian (Ptychagnostus punctuosus-zone).
- Quadragnostus, Amgaian (Kounamkites-, Triplagnostus gibbus- and T. fissus/Ptychagnostus atavus-zones) to Mayanian (Ptychagnostus punctuosus- and Goniagnostus nathorsti-zones).
- Peronopsis (Svenax), Amgaian (T. fissus/Ptychagnostus atavus-zones) to Mayanian (Ptychagnostus punctuosus- and Goniagnostus nathorsti-zones).
- Micagnostus, Amgaian (Triplagnostus gibbus-zone).
- Redeagnostus, Amgaian (T. fissus/Ptychagnostus atavus-zones) to Mayanian (Ptychagnostus punctuosus-, Goniagnostus nathorsti- and Lejopyge laevigata-zones).
- Gratagnostus, Amgaian (T. fissus/Ptychagnostus atavus-zones) to Mayanian (lowest Ptychagnostus punctuosus-zone).
- Acadagnostus, Amgaian (Triplagnostus gibbus- and T. fissus/Ptychagnostus atavus-zones) to Mayanian (Ptychagnostus punctuosus-zone).
- Baltagnostus, Amgaian (Triplagnostus gibbus- and T. fissus/Ptychagnostus atavus-zones) to lowest Ayusok-Kanskian.

== Taxonomy ==
The Peronopsidae are considered to be the earliest family of the Agnostina. This implicates that the earliest Peronopsid genus (Archaeagnostus) probably descended directly from the Eodiscoid genus Tannudiscus (Weymouthiidae). Some scholars do not consider the Agnostina true trilobites, and consequently rejected the idea that they were related to the Eodiscina.

=== Relations within the Peronopsidae ===
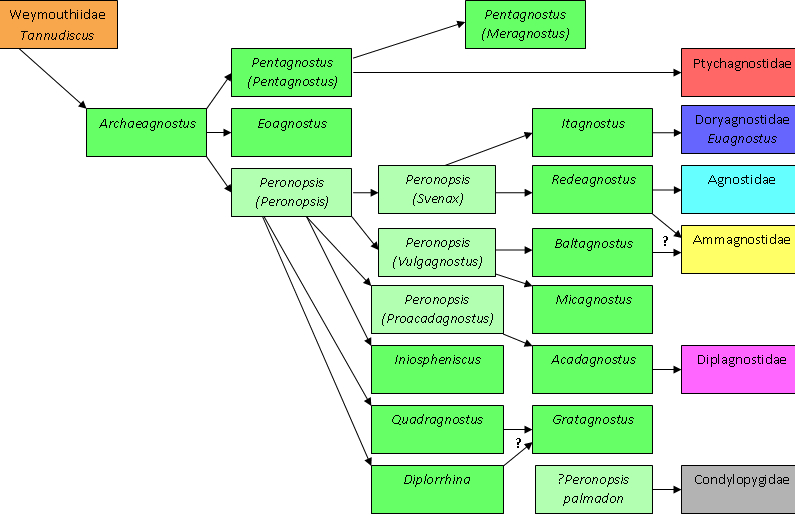
Relations between the subgenera of Peronopsis (light green), other peronopsid genera (darker green), the ancestral (orange) and descending families (other colors)

Many lineages are thought to have evolved within the Peronopsidae, six of which gave rise to later Agnostina families.

- Archaeagnostus developed into Pentagnostus, which sprouted the Ptychagnostidae family early on, and also developed into the advanced subgenus Pentagnostus (Meragnostus). Archaeagnostus also developed into the effaced genus Eoagnostus. Archaeagnostus is finally the ancestor of the subgenus Peronopsis (Peronopsis).
- The early nominate subgenus of Peronopsis gave rise to the genera Quadragnostus and Diplorrhina, either of which developed into Gratagnostus.
- Peronopsis (Peronopsis) contains the ancestor of Iniospheniscus.
- Peronopsis (Peronopsis) fathered the subgenus Peronopsis (Svenax), which early on sprouted the genus Redeagnostus, itself the ancestor of the Agnostidae family. Later Peronopsis (Svenax) probably developed into Itagnostus, which is transitional to the Doryagnostidae family.
- Peronopsis (Peronopsis) brought forth the subgenus Peronopsis (Vulgagnostus), itself the ancestor of Baltagnostus from which the Ammagnostidae descended. The effaced genus Eoagnostus also descends from Peronopsis (Vulgagnostus).
- A further lineage from Peronopsis (Peronopsis) includes Peronopsis (Proacadagnostus), Acadagnostus, and Pseudoperonopsis, the earliest genus of the Diplagnostidae family.
- Peronopsis palmadon is transitional to the Condylopygoidea superfamily.

=== Genera previously assigned to the Peronopsidae ===
- Connagnostus is reassigned to the Agnostidae
- Euagnostus is reassigned to the Doryagnostidae
- Pseudoperonopsis is reassigned to the Diplagnostidae

== Description ==
Like all Agnostida, members of the Peronopsidae are diminutive, with the headshield (or cephalon) and tailshield (or pygidium) of approximately the same size (or isopygous) and outline. Like all Agnostina, Peronopsidae have only two thorax segments. The cephalon and pygidium usually have a complete set of furrows. The preglabellar furrow - between the front and the central raised area of the cephalon (or glabella) - is lacking or incomplete. The cephalon carries no spines. The border around the pygidium is not forked.
