= Eoagnostus =

Eoagnostus Temporal range: terminal Toyonian to early Amgaian (Nephrolenellus multinodus-zone, Ovatoryctocara granulata-zone, earliest Kounamkites-zone)

Scientific classification
- Domain: Eukaryota
- Kingdom: Animalia
- Phylum: Arthropoda
- Class: †Trilobita (?)
- Order: †Agnostida
- Family: †Peronopsidae
- Genus: †Eoagnostus; Resser and Howell, 1938

Species
- Eoagnostus roddyi Resser and Howell, 1938 (type); Eoagnostus acrorhachis Rasetti and Theokritoff, 1967

Extinct genus of trilobites

Eoagnostus is an extinct genus from a well-known class of fossil marine arthropods, the trilobites. It lived during the terminal Lower Cambrian (Toyonian), until the earliest Middle Cambrian (earliest Kounamkites-zone, part of the lower Amgaian).

== Distribution ==
- Eoagnostus roddyi terminal Lower Cambrian of the United States (Bonnia-zone, Kinzers Shale, Lancaster, New York; Pennsylvania; Vermont) and the early Middle Cambrian of Newfoundland, and Greenland (around the boundary of Ovatoryctocara-zone, Henson Gletscher Formation).
- Eoagnostus acrorhachis occurs in the terminal Lower Cambrian of the United States (Bonnia-zone, Hatch Hill, New York).

== Description ==
Almost identical to Archaeagnostus, but the frontal lobe of the central raised area of the cephalon (or glabella) is effaced, while the back of glabella is inflated.
