= Sinodiscus =

Sinodiscus Temporal range: Late Atdabanian

Scientific classification
- Domain: Eukaryota
- Kingdom: Animalia
- Phylum: Arthropoda
- Class: †Trilobita (?)
- Order: †Agnostida
- Family: †Calodiscidae
- Genus: †Sinodiscus; Chang, in Lu et al. 1974

Species
- †S. shipaiensis Chang in Lu et al. 1974 (type); †S. changyangensis Zhang in Zhou et al., 1977; †S. kunshanensis Zhang & Zhou, 1985; †S. trisulcatus Zhang & Zhou, 1985

Extinct genus of trilobites

Sinodiscus is an extinct genus from a well-known class of fossil marine arthropods, the trilobites. It lived during the late Atdabanian stage, which lasted from 530 to 524 million years ago during the early part of the Cambrian Period.

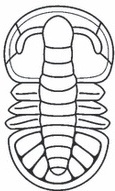
S. changyangensis Zhang, mature (holaspid) exoskeleton as reconstructed by Dai & Zhang (2013).

Dai and Zhang (2013) were able to reconstruct both the morphology and ontogeny of S. changyangensis Zhang based on a large number of well preserved examples from the lower Cambrian Shuijingtuo Formation in Changyang, Hubei Province, South China.
