= Egyngolia =

Egyngolia Temporal range: Atdabanian to Botomian

Scientific classification
- Kingdom: Animalia
- Phylum: Arthropoda
- Clade: †Artiopoda
- Class: †Trilobita (?)
- Order: †Agnostida
- Family: †Yukoniidae
- Genus: †Egyngolia; Korobov, 1980

Species
- E. obtusa Korobov, 1980 (type); E. willochra Jell, 1990; E. zaicevi (Korobov, 1980) synonym Mongolodiscus zaicevi

Synonyms
- Mongolodiscus

Extinct genus of trilobites

Egyngolia is a genus of very small sized trilobites, that lived during the Lower Cambrian (Atdabanian to Botomian) in what are today the Russia Federation (Siberian Platform, Dzhagdy Mountains), Mongolia, and South Australia.

== Etymology ==
Egyngolia has been named after the Egyngolskaya Suite, the type location of the type species of the genus. obtusa means blunt.

== Distribution ==
- E. obtusa, Lower Cambrian (Botomian, Egyngolskaya Suite), northwestern Mongolia.
- E. willochra, South Australia (Lower Botomian)

== Description ==
Like other Agnostida the body of Egyngolia is diminutive, the headshield (or cephalon) and tailshield (or pygidium) are of approximately same size, with 3 thoracic segments in-between. For a member of the Yukoniidae family central raised area of the cephalon or (glabella) is relatively wide. The four furrows crossing the glabella are impressed as deep circular pits isolated or almost isolated from axial furrow (which defines the glabella). The two middle transverse furrows may continue faintly across the glabella. The palpebral lobes are short but prominently raised, and the librigenae tiny. The anterior border usually is a short rim marginal to a long border furrow. The pygidium has a rhachis of six or seven rings and tiny terminal portion, with a small tubercle on each ring, and without a terminal spine. The pleural areas usually with well impressed pleural furrows. The border is narrow and usually carries six pairs of small marginal tubercles.
