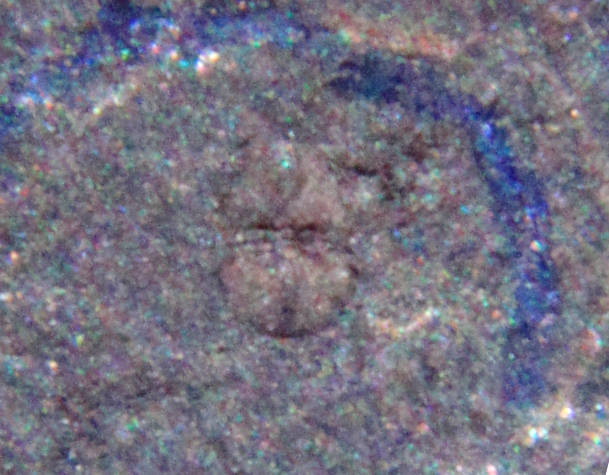
- Thoracocare minuta, 2 mm along the midline, Spence Formation

Scientific classification
- Domain: Eukaryota
- Kingdom: Animalia
- Phylum: Arthropoda
- Class: †Trilobita
- Order: †Corynexochida
- Family: †Zacanthoididae
- Genus: †Thoracocare; Robison and Campbell, 1974

Species
- T. minuta Robison and Campbell, 1974 (type) synonym Vistoia minuta; T. idahoensis (Resser, 1939) synonym Tonkinella idahoensis

= Thoracocare =

Thoracocare Temporal range: Lower Middle Cambrian (Albertella and Glossopleura-zones)

Extinct genus of trilobites

Thoracocare is a minute to very small (1.7 – 3.6 mm long) trilobite, that lived during part of the Middle Cambrian in what are today the states of Idaho, Nevada and Utah. It is the only trilobite known with just two thorax segments outside most members of the Agnostida order. It can be distinguished from Agnostida by the very wide subquadrate glabella (about half the cephalon), parallel-side widening forward in the largest specimen, with the full front side touching the border. Two species are known, one, T. idahoensis, only from pygidia.

== Etymology ==
Thoracocare is derived from the Greek θώραξ (thorax) meaning "breastplate" and ἀκαρής (akares) meaning "tiny".

== Distribution ==
- Thoracocare minuta is known from the Middle Cambrian of the United States (Glossopleura-zone, Spence Tongue Member, Lead Bell Shale/Spence Shale Formation, Idaho, 42.0° N, 112.0° W).
- Thoracocare idahoensis was collected from the Middle Cambrian of the United States (Glossopleura-zone, north side of Two Mile Canyon, Malad Range, and the top bed of the Naomi Peak Limestone, both in Idaho; lower and middle Albertella-zone, Belted Range, Nevada)

== Ecology ==
Thoracocare minuta occurs in the same deposit as Pagetia rugosa, Pentagnostus bonnerensis, Elrathina spencei, Oryctocare sp., Oryctocephalus walcotti, and Ogygopsis typicalis. Scholars consider that Thoracocare minuta may have lived in the water column (a pelagic lifestyle) rather than on the seafloor.

== Description ==
Thoracocare is a very small to minute trilobite (1.7 – 3.6 mm long in adulthood), with an elliptical body outline. The headshield (or cephalon) and tailshield (or pygidium) are of approximately same size (or isopygous) with 2 thoracic segments between them. The central raised area of the cephalon (or glabella) is broad, subrectangular, tapering slightly to the back in larger specimens and touching the frontal border, and without transverse furrows. Fixed cheeks are subtriangular. Free cheeks are rarely present. Dorsal sutures are proparian. The pygidium is subcircular, about 1 2/3× as wide as long. The segmentation of the pygidial axis (or rhachis) and pleura is indiscernible or very weak. The rhachis is about 1/3 of the pygidial width anteriorly, tapering evenly backwards. There is no pygidial border. There may be small spines extending from the frontal corners of the pygidium.

=== Differences with other Corynexochida ===
All other known corynexochoid genera have at least five thorax segments. Other early (Middle Cambrian) species also differ by having less wide glabellas and better defined pygidial furrows.

=== Differences with Agnostida ===
In Thoracocare minuta the glabella is more than 1/3 of the width of the cephalon, is parallel sided or expands forward and reaches the frontal border. It also lacks a pygidial border.
