= Acadagnostus =

Acadagnostus Temporal range: Middle Cambrian (upper Amgaian to latest Mayaian)

Scientific classification
- Kingdom: Animalia
- Phylum: Arthropoda
- Clade: †Artiopoda
- Class: †Trilobita (?)
- Order: †Agnostida
- Family: †Peronopsidae
- Genus: †Acadagnostus; Kobayashi, 1939

Species
- A. acadicus (Hartt in Dawson, 1868) (Type) synonyms Agnostus acadicus, Peronopsis tramitis, Pseudoperonopsis iniugata; A. ancisa (Öpik, 1979) synonym Pseudoperonopsis ancisa; A. australis (Robison, 1978) synonym Baltagnostus australis; A. certus (Öpik, 1979) synonym Euagnostus certus; A. karatauensis (F. Ergaliev, 2008) synonym Lisogoragnostus karatauensis; A. rakuroensis Kobayashi, 1939 synonyms Agnostus damesi, Agnostus liaotungensis, Peronopsis uzbekistanica; A. syrma (Öpik, 1979) synonym Pseudoperonopsis syrma

Genus of trilobites

Acadagnostus is a genus of trilobite from the Middle Cambrian, with 7 species currently recognized. The type species A. acadicus has the widest distribution known from any peronopsid (with Peronopsis integer and P. scutalis) and has been found in North America, Greenland, England, Western Europe, Eastern Europe, Central Asia, the Altai Mountains, the Siberian shield, China, and Australia.

== Etymology ==
- ancisa is Latin meaning 'cut round', referring to the shape of the rear pygidial margin.
- australis is Latin for 'southern'.
- certus is Latin meaning 'definite' or 'sure'.
- syrma is Ancient Greek meaning 'robe with a train', indicating the wide pygidial border in the rear.

== Description ==
Like all Agnostida, Acadagnostus is diminutive, with the headshield (or cephalon) and tailshield (or pygidium) of approximately the same size (or isopygous) and outline. Like all Agnostina, Acadagnostus has only two thorax segments. Like all Peronopsidae, the cephalon and pygidium have a complete set of furrows, and the preglabellar furrow - between the front of the central raised area of the cephalon (or glabella) - is lacking or incomplete.

Acadagnostus has a round cephalon without spines. The cephalic border is narrow, while the border furrow is wide. The lateral furrows of posterior lobe of glabella can be seen as sets of pits or a narrow straight or slightly curved backward furrow. It carries a node at or slightly behind the center of the rear lobe. The pygidium is subquadrate, has a flat border, that is sometimes posteriorly widened and has a weak bifurcation. A pair of small spines at the outer rear corners is present. The border furrow is wide. The rhachis has parallel sides or is conical, but the second segment is not narrower than its neighbours. Furrows crossing the rhachis are absent or weak. The segments are shown by differences in relief of the rhachis. There is a large median node, and a postaxial furrow is present, but usually very short.

== Taxonomy ==
Schematic showing the relationship between Acadagnostus (light green), other Peronopsid genera (darker green) and other families (other colors).

The ancestor of Acadagnostus is probably close to Peronopsis normata. It is believed that Acadagnostus gave rise to Pseudoperonopsis, the earliest representative of the Diplagnostidae family.
