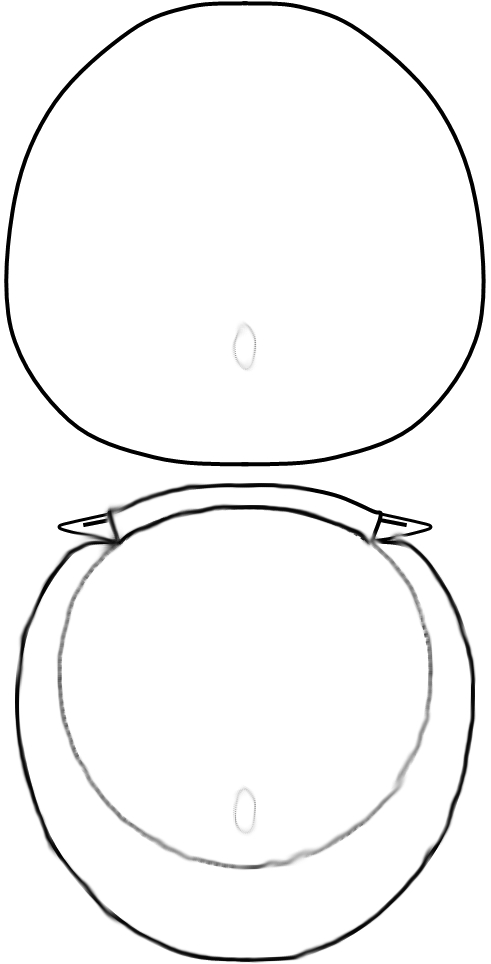
- Sphaeragnostus cingulatus, linedrawing

Scientific classification
- Kingdom: Animalia
- Phylum: Arthropoda
- Class: Trilobita
- Order: Agnostida
- Family: Sphaeragnostidae Kobayashi, 1939
- Genus: Sphaeragnostus Howell & Resser in Cooper & Kindle, 1936

Species
- S. similaris (Barrande, 1872) (Type) synonym Agnostus similaris; S. cingulatus (Olin, 1906) synonym Agnostus cingulatus, S. cerus, S. gaspensis europeensis, S. subcircularis; S. gaspensis gaspensis Howell & Resser in Cooper & Kindle, 1936; S. gaspensis quxianensis Ju in Qiu et al, 1983; S. nudatus Koroleva, 1982; S. orientalis Petrunina

= Sphaeragnostus =

Sphaeragnostus Temporal range: Ordovician

Sphaeragnostus is an extinct genus from a well-known class of fossil marine arthropods, the trilobites. It can be recognized by having two thorax segments, a totally effaced headshield (or cephalon), while the tailshield (or pygidium) although effaced, has a clear furrow parallel to its border, and a short, convex, subcircular axis. It lived during the Ordovician (upper Tremadoc to Ashgill).

== Taxonomy ==
It is difficult to relate Sphaeragnostus to other agnostids, and it is undecided whether this genus should be assigned to the Agnostoidea, the Condylopygoidea, or a new monotypic superfamily.

== Distribution ==
- S. similaris has been found in the Middle Ordovian of the Czech Republic (Llandeilo of Bohemia, Dobrotivå Formation).
- S. cingulatus is known from the Upper Ordovician of Sweden (Koången, Lindegård near Lund, and Scania, Jerrestad Mudstone Formation), Denmark (Vasegård, Læså, Bornholm, Jerrestad Mudstone), Poland (Brzezinki) and China (Katian of Jiangxi, western Zhejiang and Subei, Gansu).
- S. gaspensis was collected from the Upper Ordovician of Canada (Grande Coupe beds, Percé, Quebec)
- S. nudatus has been excavated from the Upper Ordovician of Kazakhstan (lower Majlisor horizon, Caradoc).

== Description ==
Like all Agnostida, Sphaeragnostus is diminutive and the cephalon and pygidium are of approximately the same size and outline (or isopygious). Like all Agnostina, Sphaeragnostus has only two thorax segments. The cephalon is externally totally effaced and lacks border furrows, axial furrows, and the glabellar node. The pleural regions of thorax segments are very small, while the axis is very wide (perpendicular to the midline) and remarkably short (along the axis). The pygidium has well-defined border furrows and narrow borders. Axial furrows define a short, broad, convex, subcircular, and unfurrowed axis, that bears both axial and terminal nodes. It lacks a median postaxial furrow. If there are spines on the ”rear corners” of the pygidium, these are minute.

=== Differences with Leiagnostus ===
Cephalons of Sphaeragnostus are extremely effaced and look much like Leiagnostus species. Pygidia of Sphaeragnostus however, differ from other highly effaced genera in a smooth but easily recognizable subcircular axis.
