= Calodiscus =

Calodiscus Temporal range: late Lower Cambrian

Scientific classification
- Kingdom: Animalia
- Phylum: Arthropoda
- Clade: †Artiopoda
- Class: †Trilobita (?)
- Order: †Agnostida
- Family: †Calodiscidae
- Genus: †Calodiscus; Howell, 1935

Species
- †Calodiscus lobatus Hall, 1847 – Type species; †Calodiscus foveolatus Howell, 1935; †Calodiscus lunulatus (Kobayashi, 1943) [=Brevidiscus lunulatus Kobayashi, 1943]; †Calodiscus tianshanicus Xiang & Zhang, 1985 [=C. xinjiangensis Xiang & Zhang, 1985]; †Calodiscus resimus Repina, 1972; †Calodiscus schucherti (Matthew, 1896)

Synonyms
- Goniodiscus Raymond, 1913; Brevidiscus Kobayashi, 1943

Genus of trilobite

Calodiscus is a genus of Eodiscinid trilobite in the family Calodiscidae. It lived during the late Lower Cambrian, with remains found in Canada (Newfoundland & Labrador), the United States (Massachusetts, New York State), Greenland, The United Kingdom (England), Sweden, France, Germany, Italy (Sardinia), Kazakhstan, the Russian Federation and China.

The type species by original designation is Agnostus lobatus Hall, 1847 from the upper part of the lower Cambrian Browns Pond Formation (formerly Schodack Formation) at Troy in the Taconic region of New York State, USA [= Calodiscus korolevi Pokrovskaya in Ergaliev and Pokrovskaya, 1977; Calodiscus lakei Rasetti, 1952; and Calodiscus n. sp. A of Geyer, 1988, according to Cederström et al., 1988].

Lochman (1956) demonstrated that Calodiscus agnostoides (Kobayashi, 1943) represents late meraspid instars of C. lobatus (Cederström et al., 1988, p. 500).

Of four named Calodiscus species from the Lower Cambrian of the Siberian Platform revised by Korovnikov and Bushuev (2024) only two, C. resimus Repina, 1972 and C. schucherti (Matthew, 1896) were retained in the genus. C. helena (Walcott, 1889) and C. granulosus Jegorova et Shabanov, 1972 (Korovnikov and Bushuev, op cit.) were considered significantly different to assign them a new genus, Paracalodiscus, within the family Weymouthiidae Kobayashi, 1943.

The generic homonym Calodiscus, as described by Rabenhorst in 1853, is a genus of freshwater diatom. However the type species, Calodiscus superbus, has been reclassified as Campylodiscus superbus (Rabenhorst).
