= Skryje (Rakovník District) =

- Municipality
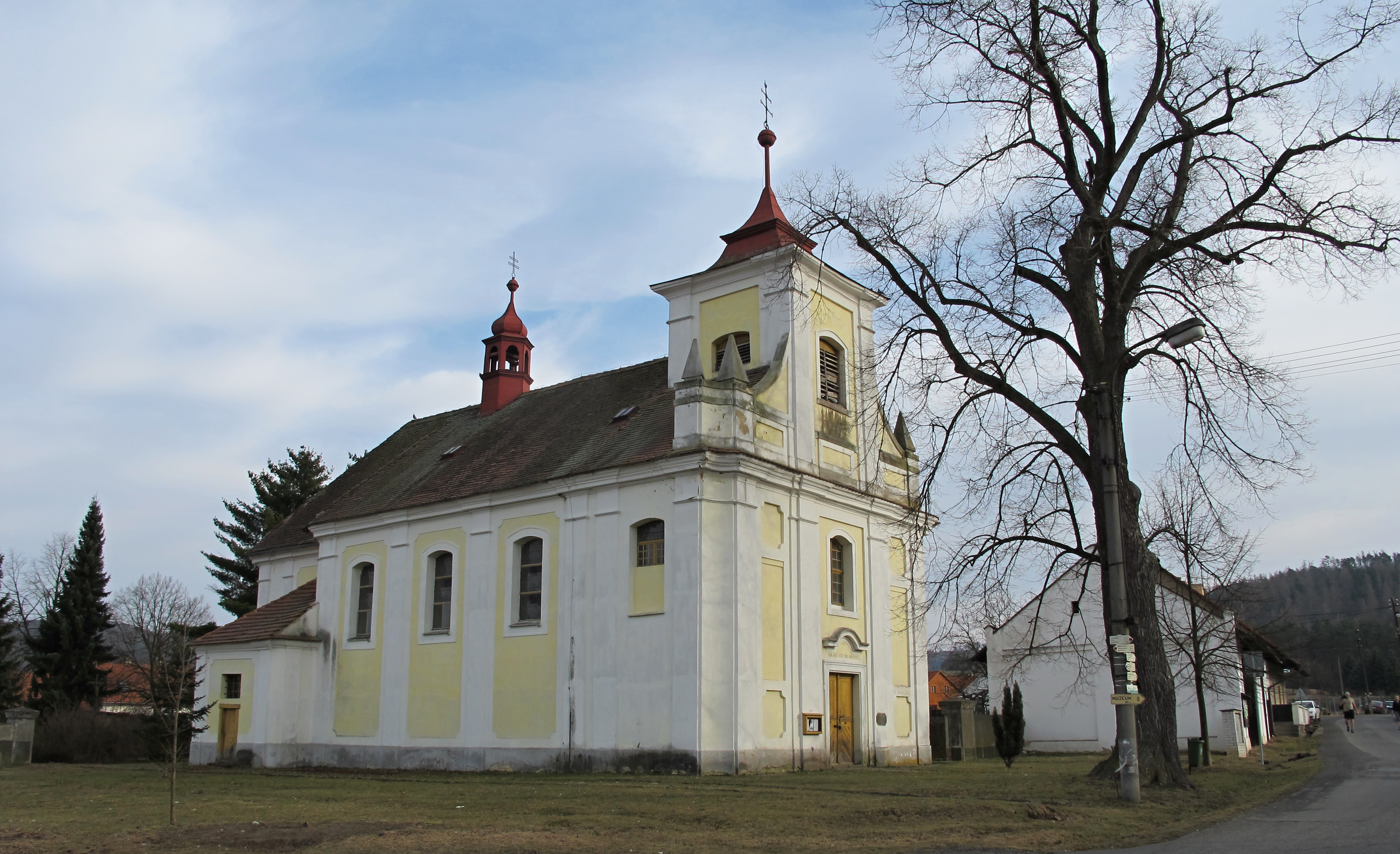
- Church of Saint Michael the Archangel

- Flag Coat of arms

- Location in the Czech Republic
- Coordinates: 49°57′54″N 13°45′52″E
- Country: Czech Republic
- Region: Central Bohemian
- District: Rakovník
- First mentioned: 1239

Area
  - Total: 15.05 km^{2} (5.81 sq mi)
- Elevation: 332 m (1,089 ft)

Population (2026-01-01)
  - Total: 160
  - Density: 11/km^{2} (28/sq mi)
- Time zone: UTC+1 (CET)
  - Summer (DST): UTC+2 (CEST)
- Postal code: 270 42
- Website: www.skryje.cz

Skryje is a municipality and village in Rakovník District in the Central Bohemian Region of the Czech Republic. It has about 200 inhabitants. The historic centre of the village is well preserved and is protected as a village monument zone.

== Etymology ==
The Czech word skryj denoted a person who was hiding or who was hiding something. The name Skryje denoted the village where such people lived.

== Geography ==
Skryje is located about 15 kilometres (9 mi) south of Rakovník and 40 km (25 mi) west of Prague. The northern part of the municipal territory lies in the Plasy Uplands, the southern part lies in the Křivoklát Highlands. The highest point is the hill Vlastec at 612 m (2,008 ft) above sea level. The municipality is situated on the right bank of the Berounka River. The entire municipality is located within the Křivoklátsko Protected Landscape Area.

== History ==
The first written mention of Skryje is from 1239, when it was owned by the Kladruby Abbey. From 1375 to 1601, the village was owned by various lesser nobility. From 1601 until the abolition of manorialism, Skryje was part of the Křivoklát estate.

== Demographics ==
Historical population

Year	Pop.	±%
1869	597	—
1880	592	−0.8%
1890	546	−7.8%
1900	498	−8.8%
1910	510	+2.4%

Year	Pop.	±%
1921	476	−6.7%
1930	434	−8.8%
1950	295	−32.0%
1961	265	−10.2%
1970	199	−24.9%

Year	Pop.	±%
1980	204	+2.5%
1991	163	−20.1%
2001	144	−11.7%
2011	151	+4.9%
2021	153	+1.3%

Source: Censuses

== Transport ==
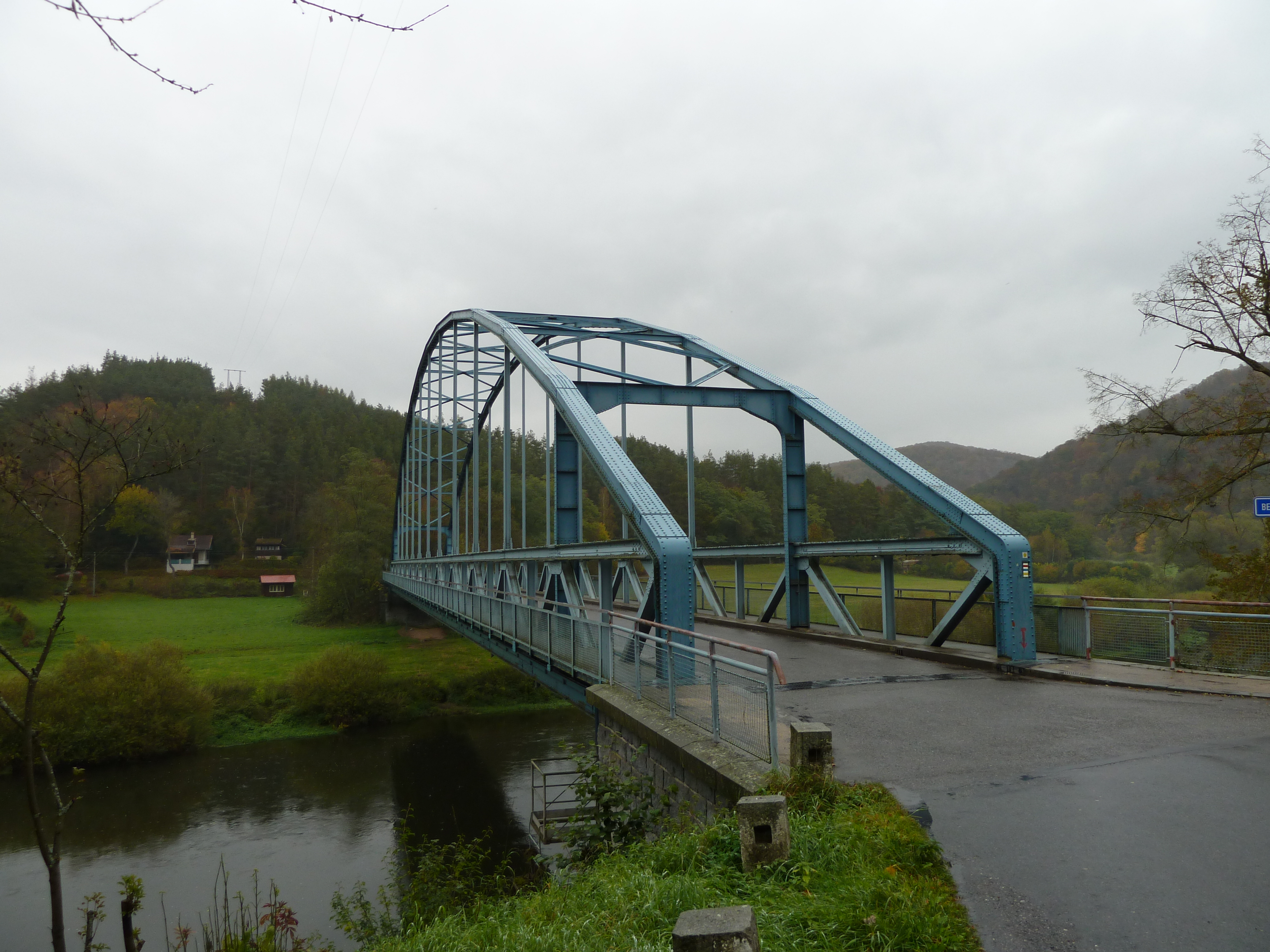
Bridge over the Berounka

There are no railways or major roads passing through the municipality.

== Sights ==
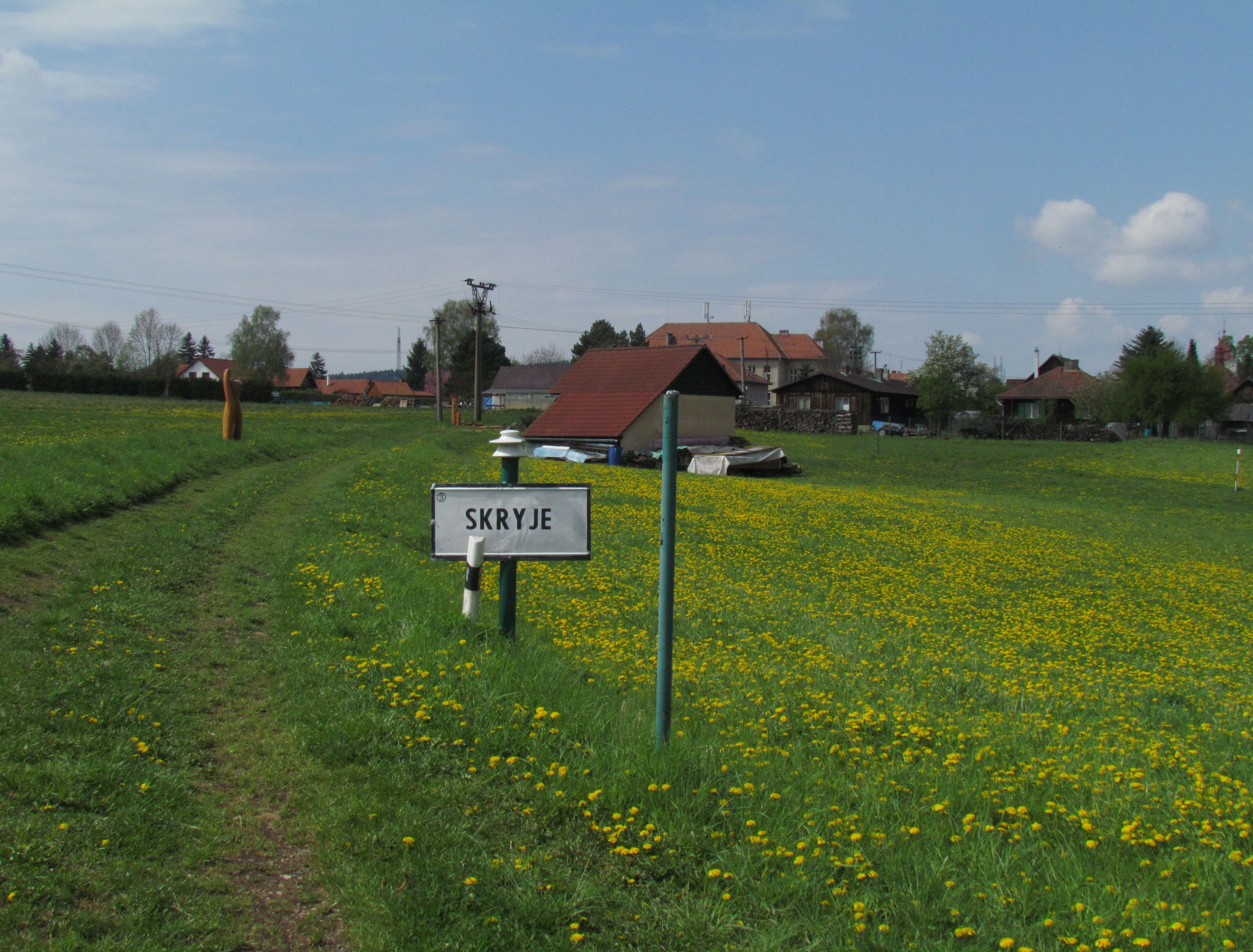
Educational trail

Skryje is known for paleontological and geological research. The first mention of the collection of local fossils comes from 1832. The village became famous when French geologist Joachim Barrande discovered rich fossil deposits of trilobites in the close surroundings of the village, when he was surveying the terrain for a horse-pulled railway.

Today there is the Monument to Joachim Barrand, which is a small museum with paleontological and geological exposition. Part of the museum is dedicated to a country life in Skryje and its surroundings in the early 20th century.

There is also an educational trail dedicated to fossil sites and creatures whose fossils have been found here. It is still possible to find fossils in several places.

The Church of Saint Michael the Archangel was first mentioned in 1350, already as a parish church. The current Baroque building dates from 1713.
