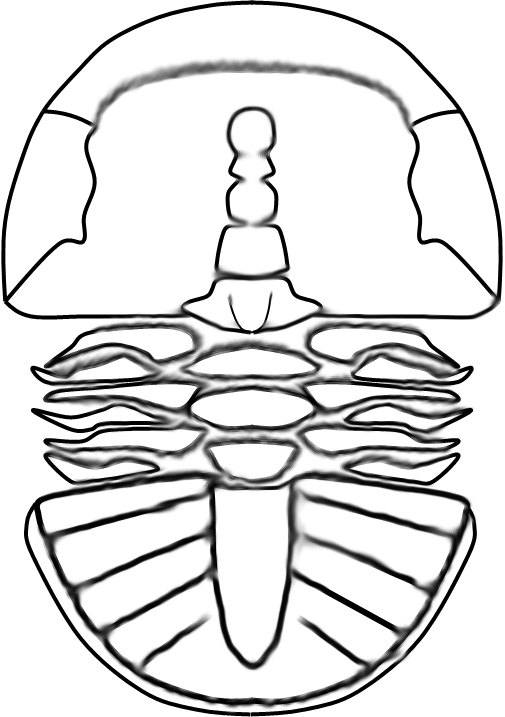
- linedrawing of Tsunyidiscus niutitangensis

Scientific classification
- Domain: Eukaryota
- Kingdom: Animalia
- Phylum: Arthropoda
- Class: †Trilobita (?)
- Order: †Agnostida
- Suborder: †Eodiscina
- Superfamily: †Eodiscoidea
- Family: †Tsunyidiscidae; Zhang, 1980
- Genus: †Tsunyidiscus; W. Chang, 1966

Species
- T. niutitangensis (Chang ,1964) (Type); T. aclis (Zhou, 1975); T. acutus (Sun, 1983); T. armatus (Zhang & Zhu, 1980); T. chintingshanensis (Lu, 1942); T. limbanodus Qian in Zhang et al., 1980; T. longquanensis (Zhang and Zhu in Zhang et al., 1980); T. pengshuiensis Zhang & Clarkson, 2012; T. pertenus Lin et al., 2004; T. yanjiazhiensis S. Zang et al. in Yin and Li, 1978; And see text

= Tsunyidiscus =

Tsunyidiscus Temporal range: Late Atdabanian

Genus of trilobites

Tsunyidiscus is a trilobite belonging to the suborder Eodiscina. Tsunyidiscus appeared near the end of the Lower Cambrian, during the late Atdabanian stage of geologic time and some collections suggest it may have survived into the Botomian. The genus is very small (up to 7mm), oculate and isopypous with a narrow dome-shaped glabella and a narrow bullet-shaped pygidial axis. Thorax consists of three segments. Tsunyidiscus is the only genus currently attributed to the family Tsunyidiscidae.

== Description ==
Like other Agnostida the body of Tsunyidiscus is diminutive, the headshield (or cephalon) and end-section (pygidium) are of approximately same size (isopygous), with 3 thoracic segments in-between, each consisting of a horizontal inner portion that abruptly passes into an inclined outer portion (fulcrate). The cephalon has a deeply parabolic outline and maximum width (tr.) usually anterior to (to the front of) genal angle. Glabella extremely narrow, lateral glabellar furrows usually obscure, with rounded and expanded frontal glabellar lobe. The most backward lobe of the glabella (called occipital ring or LO) at least as long as the lobe in front of it (L1), and is usually expanded laterally, may bear sharp, posteriorly directed spine. Long, curved posterior fixigenal spine may be present. The furrow between those two lobes (SO) is transverse and uninterrupted. The facial sutures are proparian. The free cheeks or (librigena) are ½× as long as the cephalon. The pygidium has a narrow, multisegmented axis (with five, six or more segments). The thorax and pygidial axis segments may carry nodes.

== Species and distribution ==
- Tsunyidiscus aclis (Zhou, 1975)

= Emeidiscus planilimbatus, Mianxiandiscus badaowanensis, M. emeiensis, M. gaoqiaoensis, M. jinningensis, M. sichuanensis

Collected in the Lower Cambrian of China (Atdabanian: Jinning, 24.7° N, 102.7° E and Maotianshan 24.0°N, 102.0°E, Yuanshan Formation, Yunnan).

- Tsunyidiscus acutus (Sun, 1983)

Present in the Lower Cambrian of China (Atdabanian, Shuijingtuo Formation, Yichang and Zgui, Yangtze Gorge Area, Hubei, 111°E, 30.5°N)

- Tsunyidiscus armatus (Zhang & Zhu, 1980)

Occurs in the Lower Cambrian of China (Atdabanian: Weng'an, Longshancun Section, Niutitang Formation, Guizhou, 27.1°N, 107.5°E)

- Tsunyidiscus chintingshanensis (Lu, 1942)

= T. kaiyangensis, Eodiscus chintingshanensis, Guizhoudiscus chintingshanensis, G. kaiyangensis, H. chintingshanensis

Occurs in the Lower Cambrian of China (Zhongxin).

- Tsunyidiscus limbanodus Qian in Zhang et al., 1980
- Tsunyidiscus longquanensis (Zhang and Zhu in Zhang et al., 1980)

= Shizhudiscus longquanensis

- Tsunyidiscus niutitangensis (Chang, 1964)

= Hebediscus niutitangensis

Known from the Lower Cambrian of China (Atdabanian: Jinning, 24.7° N, 102.7° E and Malong, 25.4° N, 103.4° E, Yuanshan Formation, Yunnan; Zhijin, Gezhongwu Section, and Weng'an, Longshancun Section, Niutitang Formation, GuiZhou, 26.7°N, 105.8°E.

- Tsunyidiscus pengshuiensis Zhang & Clarkson, 2012 was extracted from the Lower Cambrian of China (Qiongzhusi Formation).
- Tsunyidiscus pertenus Lin et al., 2004

= T. orientalis, Hebediscus orientalis, Hupeidiscus orientalis

Found in the Lower Cambrian of China (Atdabanian: Huanglian Member, Jiumenchong Formation, 28.2°N, 109.2°E, Taijiang, Wuhe Member, Jiumenchong and Bianmachong Formations, 26.7° N, 108.3° E); Botomian: Weng'an, Longshancun Section, Mingxinsi Formation, Guizhou, 27.1°N, 107.5°E; Atdabanian: Pangwangcun Member, Huangboling Formation, Anhui, 30.1°N, 117.0°E

- Tsunyidiscus yanjiazhiensis S. Zang et al. in Yin and Li, 1978
- Tsunyidiscus sp.

Present in the Lower Cambrian of China (Atdabanian: Shuijingtuo Formation, Yangtze Gorge, Hubei, 30.8° N, 111.3° E).

== Taxonomy ==
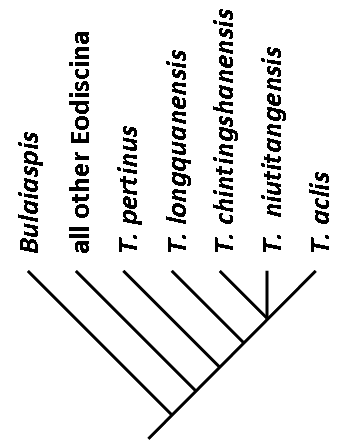
Cladogram of the relations within the monotypical family Tsunyidiscidae, with other Eodiscina and with the ancestral genus Bulaiaspis (Redlichiina, Chengkouaspidae)

=== Ancestors ===
Tsunyidiscus is the oldest known eodiscoid. The glabella of Tsunyidiscus is extremely similar to that of Dipharus clarki, and distinct from all other eodiscoids. D. clarki is thought to represent an immature stage of the redlichioid Bulaiaspis rather than an eodiscoid. This is because of the dominant palpebroocular ridges, extremely long librigenae, and free pleural tips on the pygidium of variable numbers of segments. In short: Tsunyidiscus is thought to have developed through paedomorphosis from Bulaiaspis.

=== Descendants ===
Three lineages are thought to have evolved from Tsunyidiscus. First the Hebediscidae, that themselves gave rise to the Weymouthiidae, which contain Tannudiscus, the probable ancestor of the Agnostina. Second the Yukoniidae, who sprouted the Eodiscidae. And finally the Calodiscidae.
