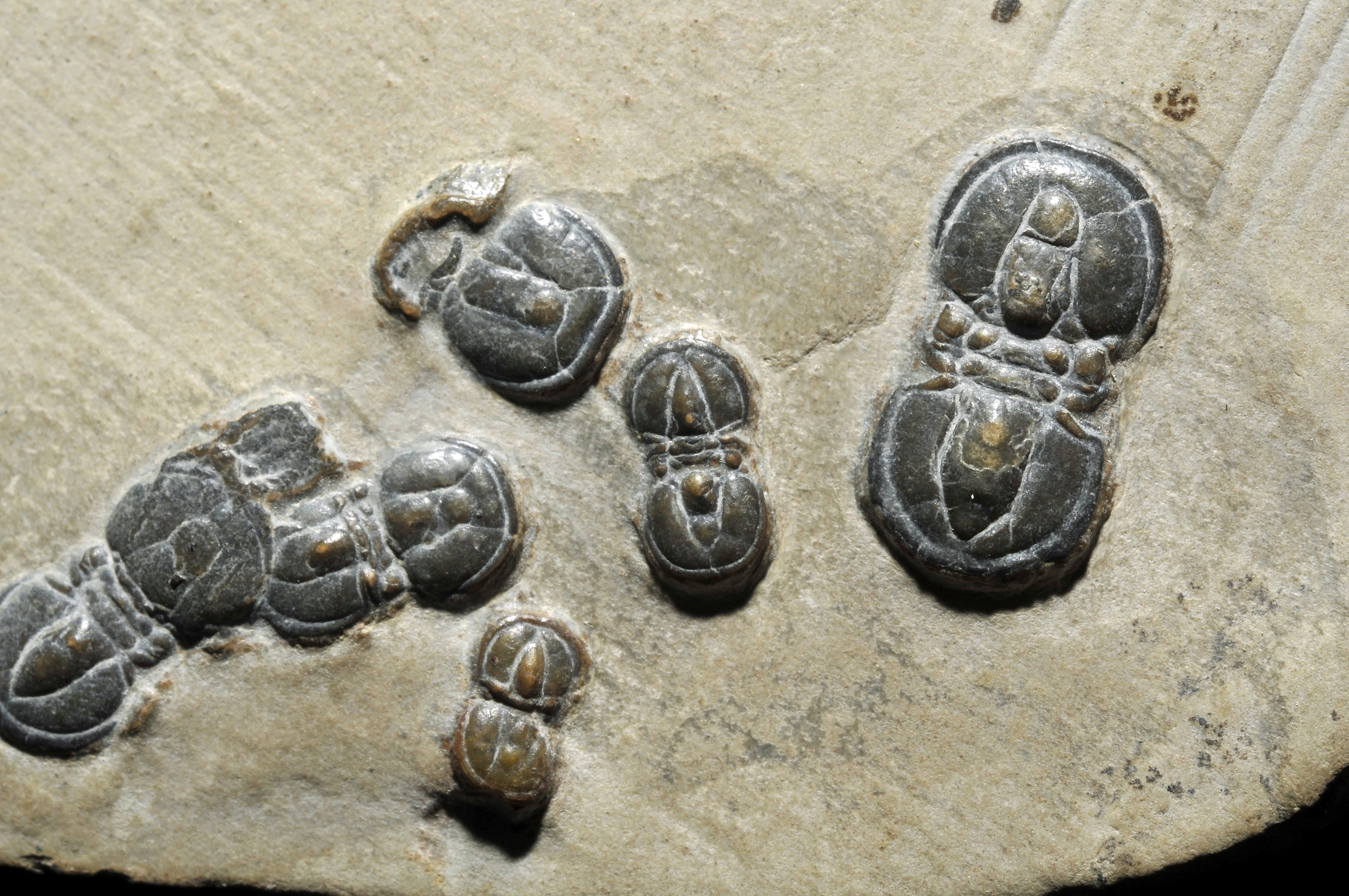
- Itagnostus interstrictus, until recently known as Peronopsis interstricta, from the Wheeler Shale, Utah

Scientific classification
- Kingdom: Animalia
- Phylum: Arthropoda
- Clade: †Artiopoda
- Class: †Trilobita (?)
- Order: †Agnostida
- Family: †Peronopsidae
- Genus: †Itagnostus; Öpik, 1979

Species
- I. elkedrensis (Etheridge, 1902) (type); I. comis (Öpik, 1979); I. doylei (Laurie, 2006); I. gaspensis (Rasetti, 1948); I. g. gaspensis I. g. taitzuhoensis (Lu, 1957): I. interstrictus (White, 1874) synonyms Euagnostus levifrons, Peronopsis interstricta; I. i. interstrictus I. i. robustus (Deiss, 1939) synonym Agnostus robustus: I. krusei (Laurie, 2006); I. oepiki (Laurie, 2004); I. subhastatus (Geyer & Peel, 2017); I. walleyae (Laurie, 2006)

= Itagnostus =

Itagnostus Temporal range: earliest Mayan to earliest Batyrbayan

Extinct genus of trilobites

Itagnostus is a genus of trilobite restricted to the Middle Cambrian. Its remains have been found in Asia, Australia, Europe, and North America.

== Distribution ==
- Itagnostus elkedrensis occurs in the Middle Cambrian of Australia (Ptychagnostus praecurrens-zone, Xystridura templetonensis-zone, and Dinesus-stage, Elkedra; Triplagnostus gibbus-zone, Sandover Beds; both Northern Territory), the Russian Federation (Kounamkites-zone, Nekekit River; Liostracus allachjunensis-zone, Lena River).
- Itagnostus comis is found in the Middle Cambrian of Australia (Triplagnostus gibbus-zone, Sandover Beds, Northern Territory).
- Itagnostus gaspensis gaspensis is reported from the Middle Cambrian of the United States (Geddes Formation, Nevada; Ptychagnostus atavus-zone, Wheeler Formation, Drum Mountains, Utah), Canada (upper part, Grosses Roches, St. Laurence, Quebec), Russian Federation (Tomagnostus fissus-zone, Lena River).
- Itagnostus gaspensis taitzuhoensis has been excavated from the Middle Cambrian of Antarctica (lower part, Shackleton Mountains), Australia (Ptychagnostus praecurrens-zone, Elkedra, Northern Territory), North-China (Bailiella-Lioparia-zone, Hsuchang Formation).
- Itagnostus interstrictus interstrictus is present in the Middle Cambrian of Canada (Ptychagnostus punctuosus-zone, Cow head Group, Newfoundland), the United States (Bolaspidella (P. atavus)-zone, Tatonduk River, Hillard Peak, Alaska; lower part of the Bolaspidella-zone, Western-Utah; Wheeler Shale, Antelope Spring, House Range, Utah), the Russian Federation (Malokuonamsky Horizon, Tomagnostus fissus-zone, and Liostracus allachjunensis-zone, all Lena River).
- Itagnostus krusei is found in the Middle Cambrian of the Russian Federation (Kounamkites-zone, Lena River).
- Itagnostus oepiki has been collected in the Middle Cambrian of Australia (Triplagnostus gibbus-zone, Sandover Beds; Xystridura templetonensis-zone, Elkedra; both Northern Territory).
- Itagnostus walleyae is reported from the Middle Cambrian of Australia (Ptychagnostus praecurrens-zone, Elkedra, Northern Territory).
- Itagnostus sp. has been collected in the Middle Cambrian of the Russian Federation (Liosttracus allachjunensis-zone, Lena River).

Schematic showing the relationship between Itagnostus (light green) with other Peronopsid genera (darker green). The descending genus Euagnostus (Dorypygidae) is shown in blue-purple
