= Quadragnostus =

Quadragnostus Temporal range: Cambrian

Scientific classification
- Kingdom: Animalia
- Phylum: Arthropoda
- Clade: †Artiopoda
- Class: †Trilobita (?)
- Order: †Agnostida
- Family: †Peronopsidae
- Genus: †Quadragnostus; Howell, 1966

Extinct genus of trilobites

Quadragnostus is an extinct genus from a well-known class of fossil marine arthropods, the trilobites. It lived during the Cambrian Period, which lasted from approximately 539 to 485 million years ago.
