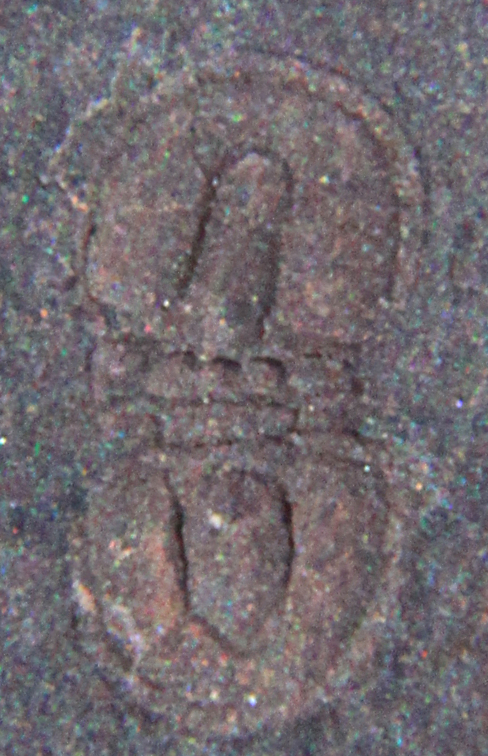
- Pentagnostus brighamensis, 6mm, Spence Formation

Scientific classification
- Kingdom: Animalia
- Phylum: Arthropoda
- Clade: †Artiopoda
- Class: †Trilobita (?)
- Order: †Agnostida
- Family: †Peronopsidae
- Genus: †Pentagnostus; Lermontova, 1940

Subgenera
- Pentagnostus (Pentagnostus); Pentagnostus (Meragnostus) Naimark, 2012; and see text for species

= Pentagnostus =

Pentagnostus Temporal range: Middle Cambrian

Extinct genus of trilobites

Pentagnostus is a genus of small, blind, agnostid trilobites restricted to the Middle Cambrian. Its remains have been found in Siberia, Australia, North America, Scandinavia, and Kazakhstan.

== Taxonomy ==
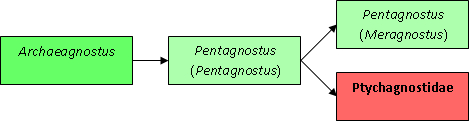
Schematic showing the relationship between both subgenera of Pentagnostus (light green), the ancestral Archaeagnostus (darker green) and the descending Ptychagnostidae (red). Based on E. B. Naimark (2012). Hundred species of the genus Peronopsis Hawle et Corda, 1847. Paleontological Journal 46(9):945-1057

The probable ancestor of Pentagnostus is Archaeagnostus. Two subgenera can be distinguished. The nominate subgenus occurred first and developed into the later subgenus Pentagnostus (Meragnostus) and the family Ptychagnostidae.

== Species and distribution ==
=== Subgenus Pentagnostus (Pentagnostus) ===
- P. anabarensis (Lermontova, 1940) (type)
- P. ademptus (Prokovskaya and Jegorova, 1972)
- P. brighamensis (Resser, 1938)
- P. shergouldi (Laurie, 2004)
- P. veles (Öpik, 1979) synonym P. endemicus.
- P. praecurrens (Westergård, 1936)

=== Subgenus Pentagnostus (Meragnostus) ===
- P. bonnerensis (Resser, 1939) (type) synonyms P. admirabilis and Agnostus lautus.
- P. bulkurensis (Prokovskaya and Pregel, 1982)
- P. remotus (Prokovskaya and Jegorova, 1969)
- P. segmentus (Robison, 1964)
- P. shabactensis Ergaliev, 2008 synonym Peronopsis ultima Ergaliev, 1980 non Poulsen 1960.
