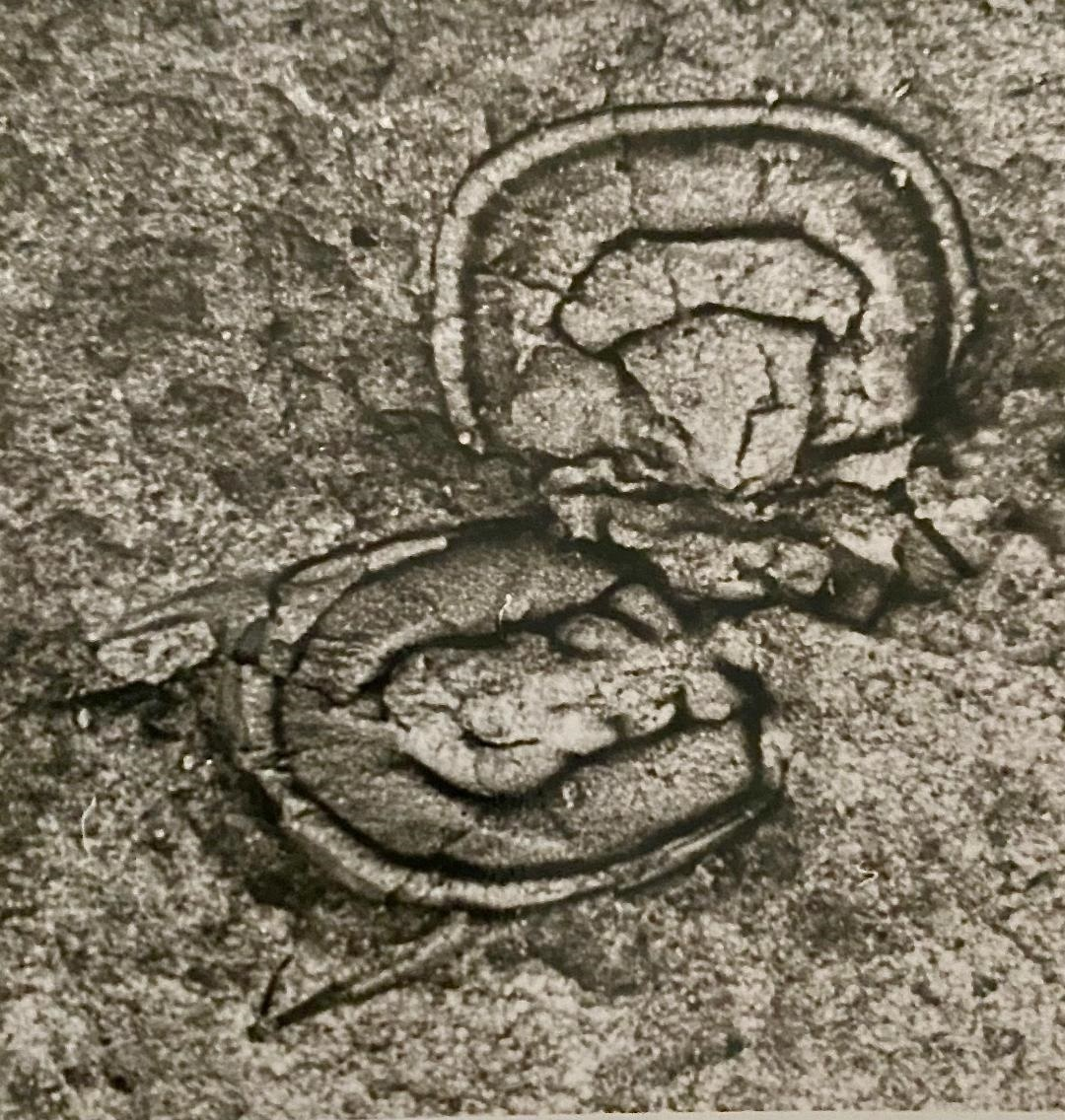
- Pleuroctenium granulatum granulatum Menevia Formation, Wales

Scientific classification
- Domain: Eukaryota
- Kingdom: Animalia
- Phylum: Arthropoda
- Class: †Trilobita (?)
- Order: †Agnostida
- Family: †Condylopygidae
- Genus: †Pleuroctenium; Hawle & Corda, 1847

Species
- P. granulatum (Barrande, 1846) (type) synonyms Battus granulatus, Agnostus granulatus, Dichagnostus granulatus; P. granulatum granulatum; P. granulatum pileatum Rushton, 1966; P. granulatum scanense Westergård, 1946; P. bifurcatum (Illing, 1916); P. magnificum Howell, 1935; P. tuberculatum (Illing, 1916)

Synonyms
- Dichagnostus

= Pleuroctenium =

Pleuroctenium Temporal range: early Middle Cambrian (Amgaian to Mayaian)

Pleuroctenium is an agnostid trilobite belonging to the family Condylopygidae Raymond (1913). The genus occurs in Middle Cambrian (Drumian) strata of Canada (Newfoundland and New Brunswick), the Czech Republic, England and Wales, France, and Sweden.

== Type species ==
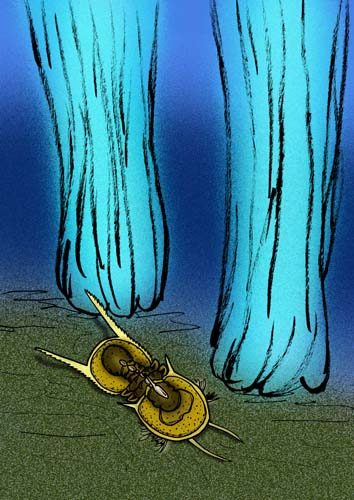
Artist's restoration of P. granulatum with pygidium spines

By subsequent designation by Vogdes (1925) Battus granulatus Barrande, 1846, p. 15., from the Middle Cambrian of Bohemia.

Lectotype: By subsequent designation by Snajdr (1958), National Museum of Prague, coll. Barrande, cc 250, No.1008; figured Barrande (1852, pl. 49, fig.5); Šnadjr (1958, pl. 2, fig. 5); and Horny & Bastl, 1970, p1. 1, fig. 6. From the Skryje Beds (Jince Fmn.), Eccaparadoxides pusillus Zone, Týřovice, Bohemia.

== Distribution ==
- P. granulatum granulatum Barrande (1846) has been collected from the early Middle Cambrian of Canada (Mawddachites hicksi Zone in the Manuels River Formation, South-East Newfoundland), the Czech Republic (higher levels of the Skryje Shales, Jince Formation, Skryje-Týřovice area), the "Paradoxides aurora" Zone to upper part of the Mawddachites hicksi Zone in the Abbey Shale Formation, Nuneaton, central England and from lower part of the Tomagnostus fissus Biozone within the Porth-y-rhaw Group, lower Menevia Formation of Dwrhyd, Nine Wells, near St David's, SW Wales. The Whitesands Bay Formation (lowest lithostratigraphic subdivision of the Porth-y-rhaw Group) of Rees et al,. (op. cit., P. 72) is conventionally referred to the biozone of "Paradoxides aurora" Salter, following Hicks (1881). However, that species is a probable junior subjective synonym of Mawddachites hicksii, and so no independent aurora Biozone can be recognized.
- P. granulatum scanense Westergard, 1946 (p. 35, pl.1, figs. 8-11 & pl.2, figs. 14-17). The holotype cephalon was figured by Westergard (op. cit., pl. 2, fig 14); from the Hypagnostus parvifrons Biozone, Andrarum, Scania). The subspecies is also recorded from the Menevia Formation (Drumian) of Porth-y-rhaw, St David's Peninsula, SW Wales, Locs. OE-1 and PR-4 of Rees et al., (op. cit p. 26, Fig. 1.17 & p. 26, Fig. 1.18, respectively).
- P. granulatum tuberculatum (Illing 1916, p. 421, pl. 33, figs. 4-8). The lectotype, SM A53055, is the specimen shown in Illing's (1916) fig. 7 of pl.33; selected and re-illustrated by Rushton (1979, p. 48, fig. 2H); from the Abbey Shale Formation, Hartshill Hayes, Nuneaton, T. fissus Biozone (horizon D3). Also recorded from the H. parvifrons Biozone, Menevia Formation in SW Wales, Loc PR-4 of Rees et al., (op. cit.) and from the Mawddachites hicksii Zone and lower part of the P. davidis Zone in the Manuels River Formation of southeastern Newfoundland (Hutchinson 1962).
- P. granulatum pileatum (Rushton 1966, p. 33, pl. 4, figs. 18 a-c), from the Purley Shale (c. 650' above base), Accadoparadoxides? pinus Zone, of Camp Hill, Stockingford, Nuneaton, Warwickshire, England. [Closest ICS interval: Cambrian Series 3 – Terreneuvian Epoch].
- P. bifurcatum (Illing 1916, p. 421, pl.33, figs. 2,3). Lectotype is SM A456, Illing's (1916) fig.2 of pl.33; selected and re-illustrated by Rushton (1979, p. 48, fig. 2C) and from the Ptychagnostus punctuosus Biozone (horizon G3), Abbey Shale Formation, Hartshill Hayes. The species occurs also in the Manuels River Formation of SE Newfoundland, uppermost part of the Paradoxides davidis Zone. P. cf. bifurcatum (listed as P. bifurcatum) is recorded from the Menevia Formation of Porth-y-rhaw, SW Wales, Pt. punctuosus Biozone (Loc. PR-12 of Rees et al. 2014, p. 27 & Fig. 1.18), and differs from bifurcatum (s.s.) in lacking the double row of three tubercles on the pygidium. Rushton (1979, p. 49) also mentioned a doubtful pygidium from Illing's Abbey Shales horizon G1, lowest horizon of the Pt. punctuosus Biozone at Nuneaton, which lacks the double row of tubercles on the axis, but which otherwise agrees with that of P. bifurcatum.
- P. magnificum Howell (1935) is from the Middle Cambrian of Hérault, Southern France.
