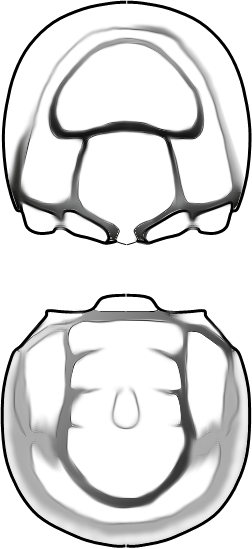
- Line drawing of Condylopyge cf. regia

Scientific classification
- Domain: Eukaryota
- Kingdom: Animalia
- Phylum: Arthropoda
- Class: †Trilobita (?)
- Order: †Agnostida
- Suborder: †Agnostina
- Superfamily: †Condylopygoidea; Raymond, 1913
- Family: †Condylopygidae; Raymond, 1913

Genera
- Condylopyge; Pleuroctenium

= Condylopygidae =

Condylopygidae Temporal range: early Middle Cambrian (Amgaian to Mayaian)

Family of trilobites

The Condylopygidae are a family of small trilobites that lived during the Middle Cambrian, and found in Canada (Newfoundland and Nova Scotia), the Czech Republic, Germany, France, Spain, England, Wales, Sweden, and the Russian Federation (Siberia). They uniquely differ from all other Agnostina in having the frontal glabellar lobe wider than the rear lobe. The Condylopygidae are the only family assigned to the superfamily Condylopygoidea.

== Taxonomy ==
The Condylopygoidea are an isolated branch in the Agnostina suborder that occur approximately contemporaneously with the Peronopsidae, the earliest representatives of the main branch of the Agnostina. One species, Peronopsis palmadon, appears intermediate between Peronopsidae and Condylopygidae, but it is not clear whether P. palmadon is ancestral to the Condylopygidae - a regression towards ancestral characters or an example of parallel evolution.

== Description ==
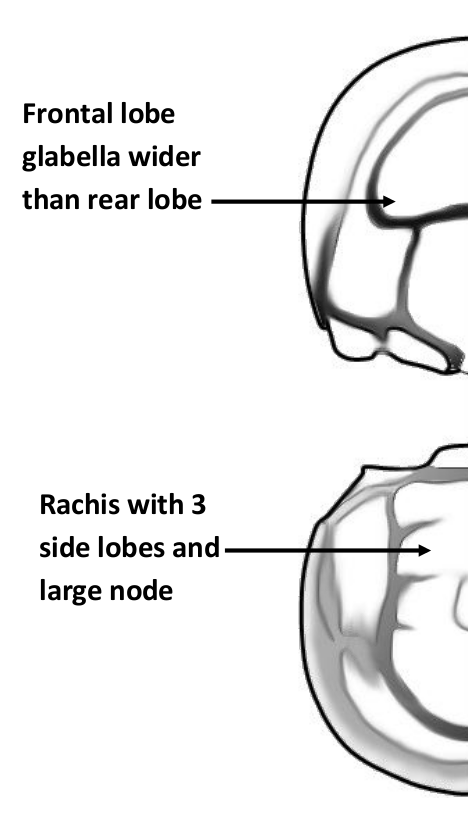
Drawing of Condylopyge cf regia explaining unique anatomic features

Like all Agnostida, members of the Condylopygidae are relatively small and isopygous with the cephalon and pygidium of approximately similar size and outline. The characteristic expansion of the glabellar frontal lobe, occipital structures instead of basal lobes, and pygidial axis with three pairs of side lobes and a posterior axial lobe differentiate Condylopygoidea from Agnostoidea.

== Key to the genera ==
1	The frontal lobe of the glabella is wider than the rear lobe, giving the glabella its characteristic mushroom shape, but it does not partly envelop the sides of the rear lobe, and the frontal lobe is never longitudinally bisected (sag.) as in Pleuroctenium. . → Condylopyge
-	The frontal glabellar lobe is wider than the rear lobe, partly envelops the sides of the rear lobe and is often bisected longitudinally along the midline. → Pleuroctenium
