= Archaeagnostus =

Archaeagnostus Temporal range: terminal Toyonian to early Amgaian (Nephrolenellus multinodus-zone, Ovatoryctocara granulata-zone, earliest Kounamkites-zone)

Scientific classification
- Domain: Eukaryota
- Kingdom: Animalia
- Phylum: Arthropoda
- Class: †Trilobita (?)
- Order: †Agnostida
- Family: †Peronopsidae
- Genus: †Archaeagnostus; Kobayashi, 1939

Species
- A. primigeneus Kobayashi, 1939(Type); A. evansi Rasetti and Theokritoff, 1967; A. majiangensis Lu, 1974

Extinct genus of trilobites

Archaeagnostus is an extinct genus from a well-known class of fossil marine arthropods, the trilobites. It lived from the terminal Toyonian to early Amgaian. Species belonging to this genus have been found in Eastern North America, the Newfoundland in Canada, the Henson Gletscher Formation in Greenland, the Nekekit and Molodo Rivers in Eastern Siberia, and in Guizhou, China.

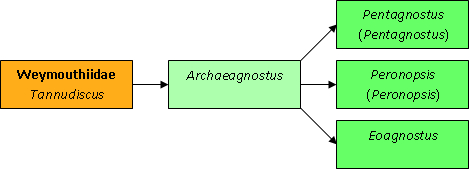
Schematic showing the relationship between Archaeagnostus (light green), other Peronopsid genera (darker green) and other families (other colors). Based on E. B. Naimark (2012). Hundred species of the genus Peronopsis Hawle et Corda, 1847. Paleontological Journal 46(9):945-1057
