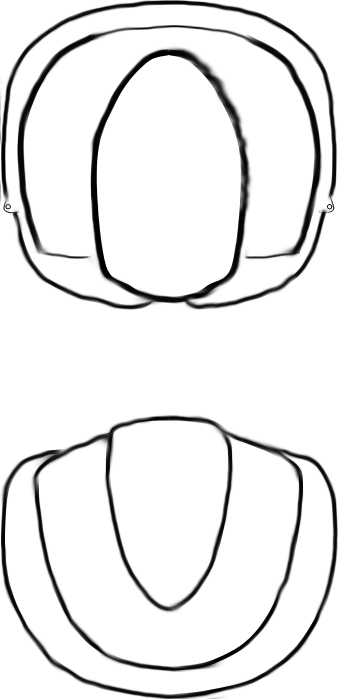
- A drawing of Oodiscus subgranulatus, cephalon and pygidium

Scientific classification
- Kingdom: Animalia
- Phylum: Arthropoda
- Clade: †Artiopoda
- Class: †Trilobita (?)
- Order: †Agnostida
- Family: †Weymouthiidae
- Genus: †Oodiscus; Rasetti, 1966

Species
- O. subgranulatus Rasetti, 1966 (type); O. binodosus Rasetti, 1966; O. longifrons Rasetti, 1966

= Oodiscus =

Oodiscus Temporal range: Botomian (Olenellus-zone)

Trilobite genus

Oodiscus is an extinct genus of small size (about 2 centimetres (0.79 in)) trilobite, with three known species. It lived during the Toyonian in what are now Canada and the USA.

== Distribution ==
Oodiscus subgranulatus is known from the upper Lower Cambrian of the USA (New York, Griswold Farm) and Canada (Newfoundland).

== Ecology ==
Oodiscus occurs in association with other Weymouthiidae (Acidiscus, Acimetopus, Analox, Bathydiscus, Bolboparia, Leptochilodiscus, Serrodiscus), and Calodiscus.

== Description ==
Like all Agnostida, Oodiscus is diminutive and the headshield (or cephalon) and tailshield (or pygidium) are of approximately the same size (or isopygous) and outline. Like all Weymouthiidae, it lacks eyes and rupture lines (or sutures). The cephalon tends towards a rounded square outline. The central raised area of the cephalon (or glabella) is wide (one-third cephalic width), strongly convex, completely unfurrowed except for shallow lateral depressions much to the back. The glabella almost reaches the border. The border has one or two pairs of marginal spines laterally and a pair of small spines posteriorly. One species has a pair of tubercles to the front. The pygidium axis is tapered, does not have furrows, and does not reach the posterior border. The border is virtually flat.
