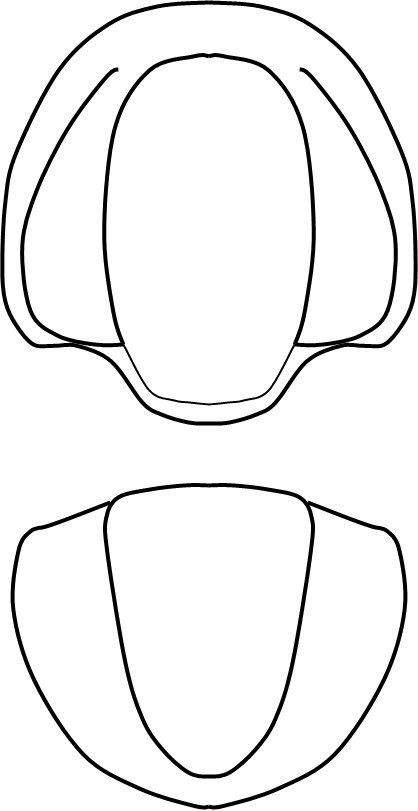
- Bathydiscus dolichometopus

Scientific classification
- Kingdom: Animalia
- Phylum: Arthropoda
- Clade: †Artiopoda
- Class: †Trilobita (?)
- Order: †Agnostida
- Family: †Weymouthiidae
- Genus: †Bathydiscus; Rasetti, 1966

Species
- B. dolichometopus

= Bathydiscus =

Bathydiscus Temporal range: Botomian (Olenellus-zone)

Bathydiscus is an extinct genus from a well-known class of fossil marine arthropods, the trilobites. It lived during the Botomian stage.

== Distribution ==
Bathydiscus is known from the Lower Cambrian of the United States (unnamed formation, East Chatham Quad, Columbia County, New York State 42°24′N 73°30′W), and of Canada (Newfoundland).

== Ecology ==
Bathydiscus occurs in association with other Weymouthiidae (Acidiscus, Acimetopus, Analox, Bolboparia, Leptochilodiscus, Serrodiscus), Calodiscus, several species of Olenellus and Bonnia (Dorypygidae).
