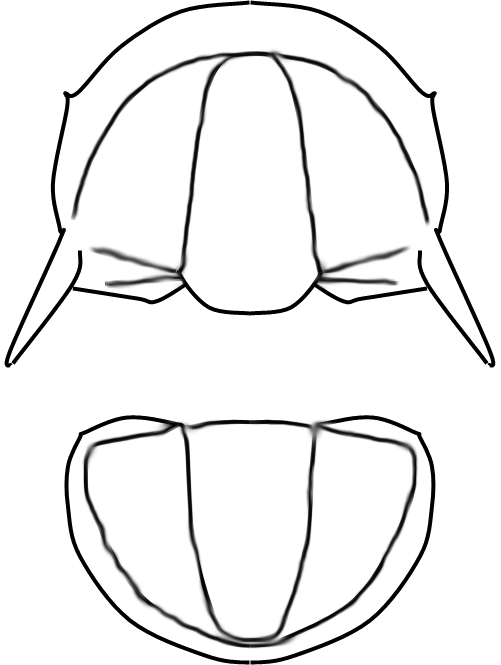
- Litometopus longispinus

Scientific classification
- Kingdom: Animalia
- Phylum: Arthropoda
- Clade: †Artiopoda
- Class: †Trilobita (?)
- Order: †Agnostida
- Family: †Weymouthiidae
- Genus: †Litometopus; Rasetti, 1966

Species
- Litometopus longispinus Rasetti, 1966

Synonyms
- Litomatopus Sepkoski, 2002 (lapsus calami)

= Litometopus =

Litometopus Temporal range: Botomian (Olenellus-zone)

Extinct genus of trilobites

Litometopus is an extinct genus of agnostid trilobite belonging to the family Weymouthiidae. It lived during the Botomian stage of the Cambrian.

== Taxonomy ==
Litometopus may be a synonym of Cobboldites.

== Distribution ==
Litometopus is known from the upper Lower Cambrian of the United States (Acimetopus bilobatus faunule, Taconic, Griswold Farm, New York).

== Description ==
Like all Agnostida, Litometopus is diminutive and the headshield (or cephalon) and tailshield (or pygidium) are of approximately the same size (or isopygous) and outline. Like all Weymouthiidae, it lacks eyes and rupture lines (or sutures). The cephalon is almost semicircular. The central raised area of the cephalon (or glabella) has a furrow along its outline, but no furrows are crossing it. It tapers forward and touches the border furrow. The border is convex, and it carries pair of small marginal spines at approximately ⅓ of the cephalic length from the front, and large genal spines, that are directed backwards and slightly outwards (±15°). Pygidium is the same shape as the cephalon. The pygidial axis is tapering backwards and touches the border furrow. It has a furrow along its outline, but crossing furrows are very faint or indiscernible. The border is flat and wide, and its doublure is sloping adaxially, and with serrated margin.
