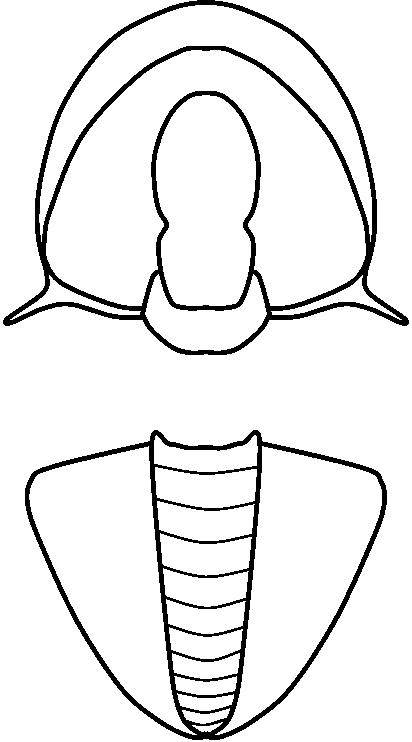
- Acidiscus birdi

Scientific classification
- Domain: Eukaryota
- Kingdom: Animalia
- Phylum: Arthropoda
- Class: †Trilobita (?)
- Order: †Agnostida
- Family: †Weymouthiidae
- Genus: †Acidiscus; Rasetti, 1966

Type species
- Acidiscus birdi

Species
- A. birdi Rasetti, 1966; A. hexacanthus Rasetti, 1966; A. theristes Rushton, 1966

= Acidiscus =

Acidiscus Temporal range: Botomian (Olenellus-zone)

Extinct genus of trilobites

Acidiscus is a genus of eodiscinid trilobite belonging to the family Weymouthiidae Kobayashi T. (1943), Order Agnostida Salter (1864). It lived during the Botomian stage = late Lower Cambrian Stage 4 (upper of two stages subdividing the unnamed Series 2); the upper Botomian boundary corresponds to base of the Middle Cambrian, Miaolingian Series and Wuliuan stage.

== Etymology ==
- A. birdi is named for Dr. John M. Bird who collected the holotype.
- A. hexacanthus is derived from the Greek hexa "six" and acanthos "spine", for having two pairs of border spines in addition to one pair of genal spines.
- A. theristes is named after a Greek in the Iliad (an epic poem written by Homer around 800 B.C.E.) who accused Agamemnon of greed and Achilles of cowardice during the Trojan War.

== Taxonomy ==
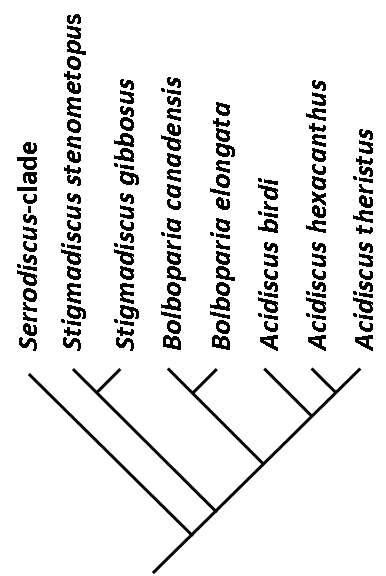

A cladogram showing the relationship between several species of the genera Acidiscus, Bolboparia and Stigmadiscus Acidiscus is most closely related to Bolboparia and slightly more distantly to Stigmadiscus. Synapomorphies for Acidiscus-Bolboparia include anterolateral cephalic spines and a large preoccipital glabellar tubercle or spine. Both of these features have been considered as being diagnostic of Acidiscus (e.g., Rushton, 1966; Rasetti, 1966;) but they are shared with Bolboparia. Synapomorphies of Bolboparia include a sharply tapered and pointed glabella, no occipital spine, tubercles confined to posterior part of the cephalic border, strongly inflated genae, and a sculpture of tightly packed coarse granules. Stigmadiscus is characterised by an inflated posterior part of the glabella, the loss of anterolateral cephalic spines and a preoccipital glabellar node, and in having a very narrow cephalic border.

Among genera currently assigned to Weymouthiidae Kobayashi, 1943 (Jell in Whittington et al. 1997), Rushton (1966, p. 12) noted that, “Acidiscus Rasetti differs from Serrodiscus but slightly”, although several of the characteristics in the former genus that he listed, include the preoccipital glabellar and anterolateral cephalic spines, and the configuration of the lateral glabellar furrows.

== Distribution ==
- A. birdi is known from the Lower Cambrian of the United States (unnamed formation, East Chatham Quad, Columbia County, New York State 42°24′N 73°30′W), Canada (Newfoundland) and England (Purley Shales of Warwickshire).
- The Holotype of A. theristes Rushton, 1966, is A 57082, held at the Sedgwick Museum of Earth Sciences, University of Cambridge and was collected by Rushton from about 450' above base of the Purley Shale Formation (Protolenus Biozone) at Camp Hill, St. Paul's Church, Stockingford, Nuneaton, Warwickshire, England [Closest ICS interval: Cambrian Series 3 – Terreneuvian Epoch].
- A. hexacanthus Rasetti (1966, p. 13, pl. 7, figs 1–6) is part of a trilobite faunule that was collected from unnamed limestone beds which form several outcrops on a hill (Griswold farm) about 1 mile southeast of North Chatham, Columbia County, New York State, USA; the faunule is referred to as the Acimetopus bilohatus faunule from one of the most common and characteristic trilobites. The Acimetopus bilobatus faunule is notable for the number and variety of trilobites of the family Eodiscidae.

== Ecology ==
A. birdi occurs in association with other Weymouthiidae (Acimetopus, Analox, Bathydiscus, Bolboparia, Leptochilodiscus, Serrodiscus), Calodiscus, several species of Olenellus, and Bonnia (Dorypygidae).

== Description ==
Like all Weymouthiidae, Acidiscus lacks eyes and facial sutures. The cephalic border carries one or two pairs of marginal spines. The glabella does not reach the border furrow and has two short pit-like pairs of lateral furrows. Occipital and genal spines are present. Thorax unknown, but all weymouthiids in which it is known have three segments. The pygidium is much like that in Serrodiscus, with an axis composed of ten rings. Pleural fields unfurrowed.
