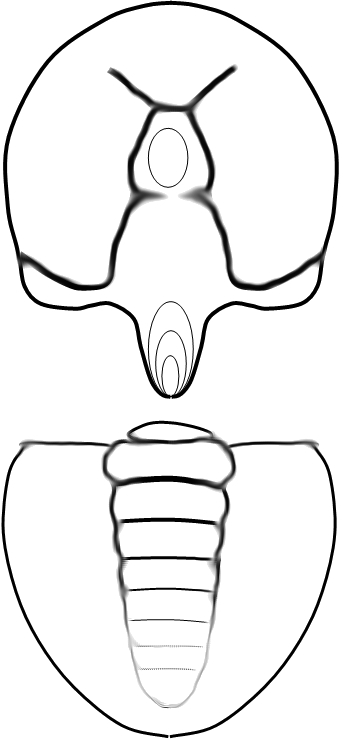
- Analox bipunctata

Scientific classification
- Domain: Eukaryota
- Kingdom: Animalia
- Phylum: Arthropoda
- Class: †Trilobita (?)
- Order: †Agnostida
- Family: †Weymouthiidae
- Genus: †Analox; Rasetti, 1966

Species
- A. bipunctata Rasetti, 1966 (type)

= Analox =

Analox Temporal range: Botomian (Olenellus-zone)

Extinct genus of trilobites

Analox is a genus of eodiscinid trilobites belonging to the family Weymouthiidae Kobayashi T. (1943), Order Agnostida (Salter 1864) It lived during the Botomian stage. It can easily be distinguished from other trilobites by the two furrows that extend forwards and sidewards from the front of the glabella.

== Distribution ==
Analox bipunctata is known from the Lower Cambrian of the United States. 42°24′N 73°30′W).

Type locality for Analox bipunctata is Rasetti's (1966) locality cs-4 in an unnamed limestone Formation which is exposed in several outcrops on a hill (Griswold Farm) about 1 mile southeast of North Chatham, Columbia County, New York State, USA; the faunule is referred to as the Acimetopus bilobatus faunule from one of the most common and characteristic trilobites.

== Ecology ==
A. bilobatus occurs in association with other Weymouthiidae (Acidiscus, Acimetopus, Bathydiscus, Bolboparia, Leptochilodiscus, Serrodiscus), Calodiscus, several species of Olenellus and Bonnia (Dorypygidae).

== Description ==
Like all Agnostida, Analox is diminutive and the headshield (or cephalon) and tailshield (or pygidium) are of approximately the same size (or isopygous) and outline. Like all Weymouthiidae, it lacks eyes and rupture lines (or sutures). The central raised area of the cephalon (or glabella) tapers forward and has a hardly discernible transverse furrow. Where the lateral portion of the furrow surrounding the glabella bends into the frontal portion, it meets left and right with the merged median and border furrows that extend more outwards than forwards, until these end in a pit some distance from the side. This is a very distinct character of Analox. The large lobe behind this furrow (or L1), extends into a massive, broad based spine that points backward and upwards. The most backwards portion of the glabella, called occipital ring, is indistinct beneath the glabellar spine. The anterior border swollen medially, defined by the furrows running anterolaterally from axial furrow at front of glabella. There is no lateral cephalic border. The posterior border furrow fades out a little in front of genal angle. The pygidium has a long axis (of about eight rings). The pygidial border is narrow and defined by equally narrow border furrow.
