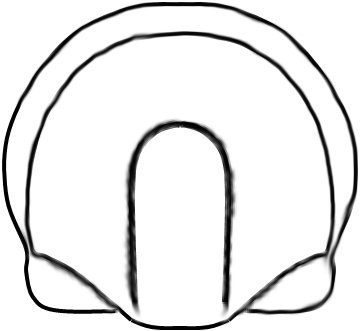
- Mallagnostus desideratus, cephalon

Scientific classification
- Kingdom: Animalia
- Phylum: Arthropoda
- Clade: †Artiopoda
- Class: †Trilobita (?)
- Order: †Agnostida
- Family: †Weymouthiidae
- Genus: †Mallagnostus; Howell, 1935

Species
- M. desideratus (Walcott, 1890b) synonym Agnostus desideratus; M. limbatus (Pokrovskaya, 1959) synonym Ladadiscus limbatus; M. llarenai (Richter & Richter, 1941)

Synonyms
- Ladadiscus Pokrovskaya, 1959

= Mallagnostus =

Mallagnostus Temporal range: Toyonian to early Middle Cambrian

Extinct genus of trilobites

Mallagnostus Howell, 1935, is a trilobite genus belonging to the family Weymouthiidae Kobayashi T. (1943), Order Agnostida Salter (1864) according to Whittington et al. 1997. It lived during the late Lower Cambrian, with remains found in USA (New York), Canada (Newfoundland), Spain, England, Russia (Tuva, Gorno-Altayskaya), Mongolia, and the early Middle Cambrian as reported from China (Tian Shan) and Russia (Yakutia).

== Taxonomy ==
Mallagnostus was originally described as belonging to the Agnostina, but it is more appropriately placed in the Eodiscina. Within the Weymouthiidae, Mallagnostus belongs to a clade that further includes Tannudiscus, Jinghediscus and the Agnostina.

== Distribution ==
- M. desideratus Walcott, 1890, is from the Lower Cambrian Olenellus Zone of North America.
- M. limbatus Pokrovskaya, 1959, has been collected from the upper Lower Cambrian of New York, and the Toyonian of the Russian Federation (Obruchev stage, Shivelig Formation, Shivelig-Khem River, Tuva, Altay-Sayan, Siberia, 51.4° N, 94.2° E)
- M. llarenai Richter and Richter, 1941, is found in the late Lower Cambrian of Spain (serratus Band, Herrerias-Mergel Formation, Cala).

== Ecology ==
Mallagnostus limbatus occurs with Tannudiscus tannuolaicus, Menneraspis striata, Beldirella pulchra and Cheiruroides maslovi.

== Description ==
Mallagnostus is isopygous and, like all Weymouthiidae, lacks eyes and facial sutures. The cephalon is semi-elliptical with unfurrowed glabella (in one species there are lateral indentations). The glabella does not quite reach the broad border furrow. The occipital ring (L0) is short (sag.), ill-defined, and does not carry a spine. Anterior border of cephalon is long, only gently convex, and becomes shallower further from the axis. The border furrow runs into the margin just in front of the genal angle. Thorax of three segments, as in all other Weymouthiidae where the thorax is known. The pygidial axis is conical with at least eight rings, and does not extend to the posterior border furrow. Pleural fields smooth.
