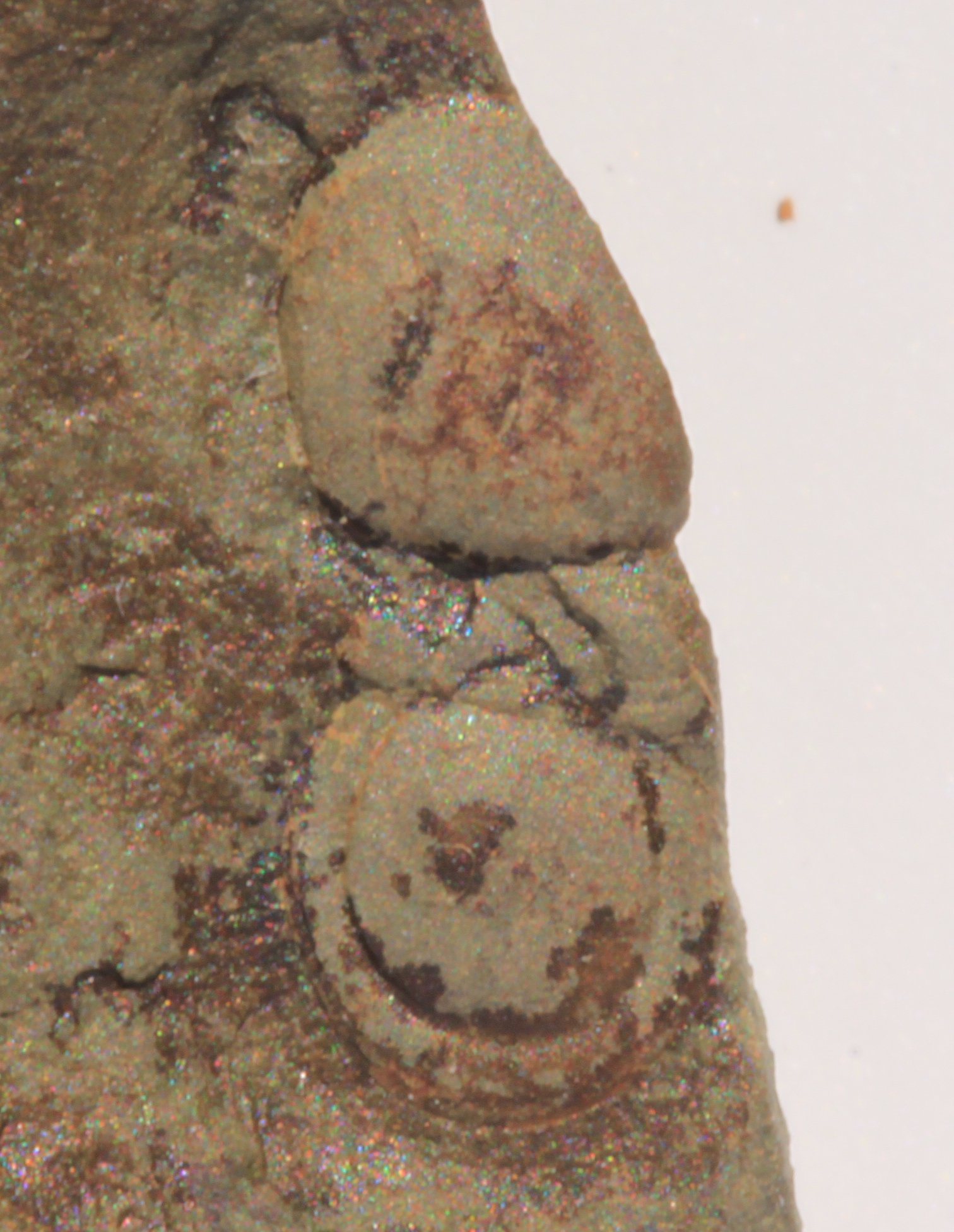
- Phalagnostus prantli, 10mm, Jince Formation, Czech Republic

Scientific classification
- Domain: Eukaryota
- Kingdom: Animalia
- Phylum: Arthropoda
- Class: †Trilobita (?)
- Order: †Agnostida
- Family: †Agnostidae
- Genus: †Phalagnostus; Howell, 1955

Species
- P. nudus (Beyrich, 1845) (type) synonyms Battus nudus, Agnostus nudus ovalis; P. carinatus Lu and Lin, 1989; P. cuneatus Rozova,1964; P. glandiformis (Angelin, 1851) synonyms Agnostus glandiformis, Grandagnostus glandiformis; P. prantli Snajdr, 1957; P. rasettii Pratt, 1992; P. shergoldi Pratt, 1992

Synonyms
- Phalacromina

= Phalagnostus =

Phalagnostus Temporal range: Middle and Upper Cambrian

Extinct genus of trilobites

Phalagnostus is a genus of small trilobites, in the order Agnostida. It lived during the Middle Cambrian, in what are now Canada (Newfoundland and Northwest Territories), China, the Czech Republic, Denmark, England, France, the Russian Federation (Bennett Island, Yakutia), Wales, Sweden, and possibly the United States (Vermont). The headshield (or cephalon) is almost entirely effaced and wider than the tailshield (or pygidium). The pygidium is also very effaced, but the ovate pygidial axis (or rhachis) is well defined and a border furrow is also present.

== Taxonomy ==
Phalagnostus nudus, the type species, was originally described as a species of Battus by Beyrich in 1845, but that name had already been used for a butterfly, and the trilobite genus was also deemed polyphyletic.

Due to the high level of effacement, establishing the relationship of Phalagnostus to other Agnostoidea is difficult. The Treatise lists Phalagnostus as family unknown.

=== Species previously assigned to Phalagnostus ===
- P. bituberculata = Toragnostus bituberculatus

== Distribution ==
- P. nudus is known from the Middle Cambrian of the Czech Republic (Eccaparadoxides pusillus-zone, Jince Formation, Týřovice and Skryje-Luh, Bohemia).
- P. carinatus has been collected from the Middle Cambrian of China (Wangcunian/Guzhangian carbonate limestone/shale, Yangliugang Formation).
- P. cuneatus was found in the Middle Cambrian of the Russian Federation (Mayan, Kulyumbe River, limestone, Samodi Formation).
- P. rasettii and P. shergoldi have been described from the Upper Cambrian of Canada (Marjuman and Steptoean stages, Rabbitkettle Formation, southern Mackenzie Mountains).

== Description ==
This agnostoid is strongly effaced. The cephalon lacks a border furrow. The glabella and small basal lobes are weakly defined. The rhachis is circular to ovate, clearly defined by deep axial furrows. An elongate axial node may be discerned. The pygidium has a narrow border defined by a furrow.
