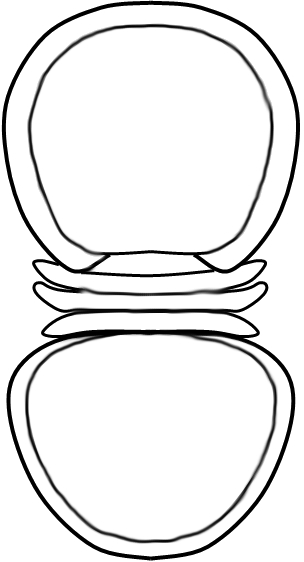
- Line drawing of Weymouthia nobilis

Scientific classification
- Kingdom: Animalia
- Phylum: Arthropoda
- Clade: †Artiopoda
- Class: †Trilobita (?)
- Order: †Agnostida
- Family: †Weymouthiidae
- Genus: †Weymouthia; Raymond, 1913

Type species
- Agnostus nobilis Ford, 1872

Species
- Weymouthia nobilis (Ford, 1872) ( syn.Agnostus nobilis; Weymouthia caudata (Delgado, 1904) (syn. Delgadella souzai caudata); Weymouthia emerici Czarnocki; Weymouthia minor Egorova, 1961; Weymouthia tchernyshevae Egorova, 1961

= Weymouthia (trilobite) =

Weymouthia Temporal range: Lower Cambrian

Extinct genus of trilobites

Weymouthia is an extinct genus of eodiscinid agnostid trilobites which lived at the end of the Lower Cambrian. Its fossils are found in Lower Cambrian marine strata from what are now the eastern United States, England, Siberia and China.

== Description ==
Like all Agnostida, Weymouthia is diminutive and the headshield (or cephalon) and tailshield (or pygidium) are of approximately the same size (or isopygous) and outline. Like all Weymouthiidae, Weymouthia lacks eyes and rupture lines (or sutures). The headshield (or cephalon) is approximately as long as wide, lacks facial sutures and is eyeless. The tailshield (or pygidium) is about 1.2× as wide as long. Both are effaced except for a furrow close to their borders. The cephalic border bears lateral tubercles. The thorax consists of three segments.

== Etymology ==
Weymouthia is named after Weymouth, Massachusetts.

== Distribution ==
- W. nobilis occurs in the Lower Cambrian of Massachusetts (Hoppin Slate, North Attleboro), and of the United Kingdom (Comley Quarry, Comley, 52.6° N, 2.8° W).

== Remarks ==
Fletcher & Theokritoff (2008) designated Shaw's (1950, pl. 79, fig. 24) specimen of “ Weymouthia nobilis (Ford, 1872)” as the holotype of a new species, Serrodiscus weymouthioides, and considered Runcinodiscus Rushton (in Bassett et al., 1976) [= ?Weymouthia nobilis (Ford, 1872)] to be a junior synonym of Serrodiscus; Rushton (1976) had previously regarded Weymouthia and Runcinodiscus as closely allied with Serrodiscus. Weymouthia nobilis (Ford 1872), first described from the Taconic region of New York State, is also recorded from the Protolenus Limestone (Ac5) [Protolenid-Strenuellid Zone] at Comley, Shropshire, England (Cobbold 1931),> but Rushton (in Bassett et al., 1976, p. 637) showed that the English specimens are specifically distinct from W. nobilis as described by Ford (1872), and thus erected his new genus and species, Runcinodiscus index Rushton (in Bassett et al. 1976, p. 636-7).
