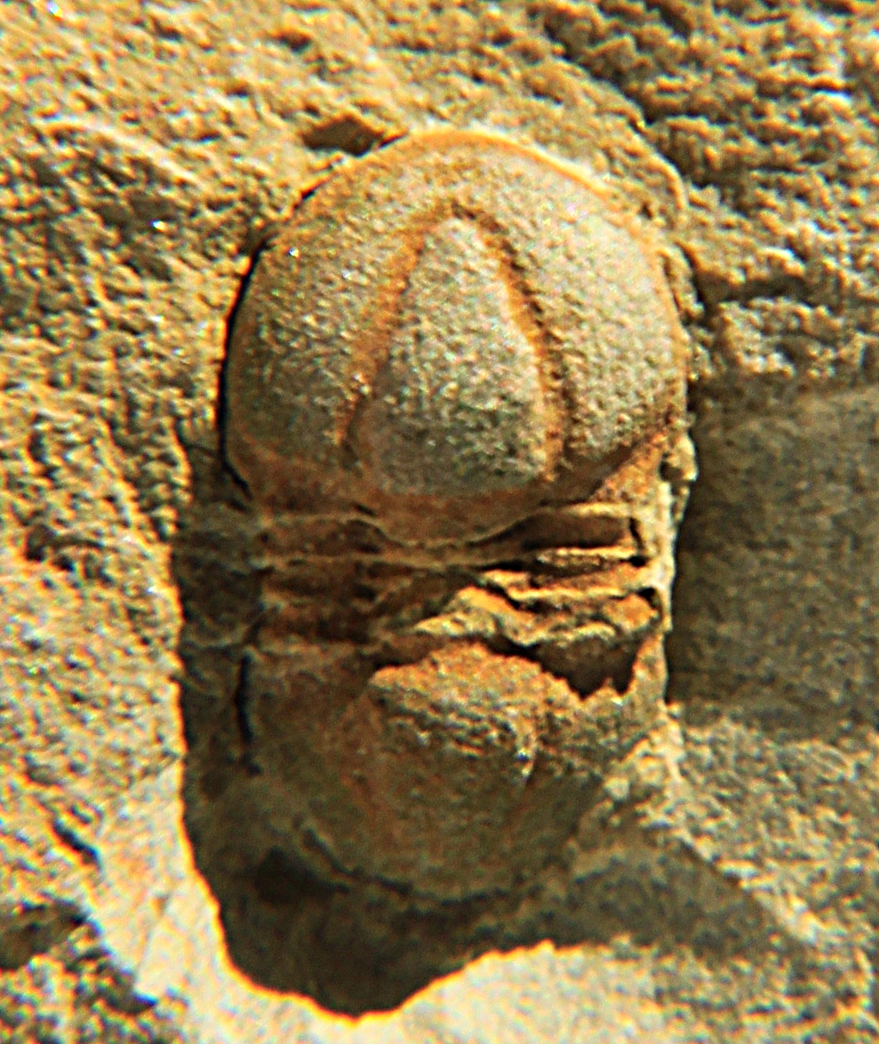
- Internal moult of Marocconus notabilis, dorsal view, 9 mm

Scientific classification
- Kingdom: Animalia
- Phylum: Arthropoda
- Clade: †Artiopoda
- Class: †Trilobita (?)
- Order: †Agnostida
- Family: †Weymouthiidae
- Genus: †Morocconus; Özdikmen, 2009
- Species: †M. notabilis

Binomial name
- †Morocconus notabilis (Geyer, 1988)

Synonyms
- Cephalopyge Geyer 1988, (non Hanel, 1905); Marocconus; Cephalopyge notabilis; Marocconus notabilis

= Morocconus =

Morocconus Temporal range: latest Lower to earliest Middle Cambrian (Cephalopyge-zone)

Genus of trilobites

Morocconus is an extinct genus from a well-known class of fossil marine arthropods, the trilobites. It is still debated if it lived at the very end of the Lower Cambrian or at the very beginning of the Middle Cambrian. Morocconus notabilis is the only known species in this genus (i.e. the genus is monotypic).

== Taxonomy ==
Morocconus replaces Cephalopyge Geyer, 1988, which is a junior homonym of Cephalopyge Hanel, 1905, a nudibranch. Cephalopyge however, is still widely used for this trilobite, and the new name Morocconus has only been mentioned one time in the scientific literature.

== Distribution ==
Morocconus notabilis is known from the latest Lower Cambrian or earliest Middle Cambrian of Morocco (Jbel Wawrmast Formation, Anti-Atlas Mountains).

== Ecology ==
Morocconus notabilis occurs in the same layers a Cambropallas telesto.

== Description ==
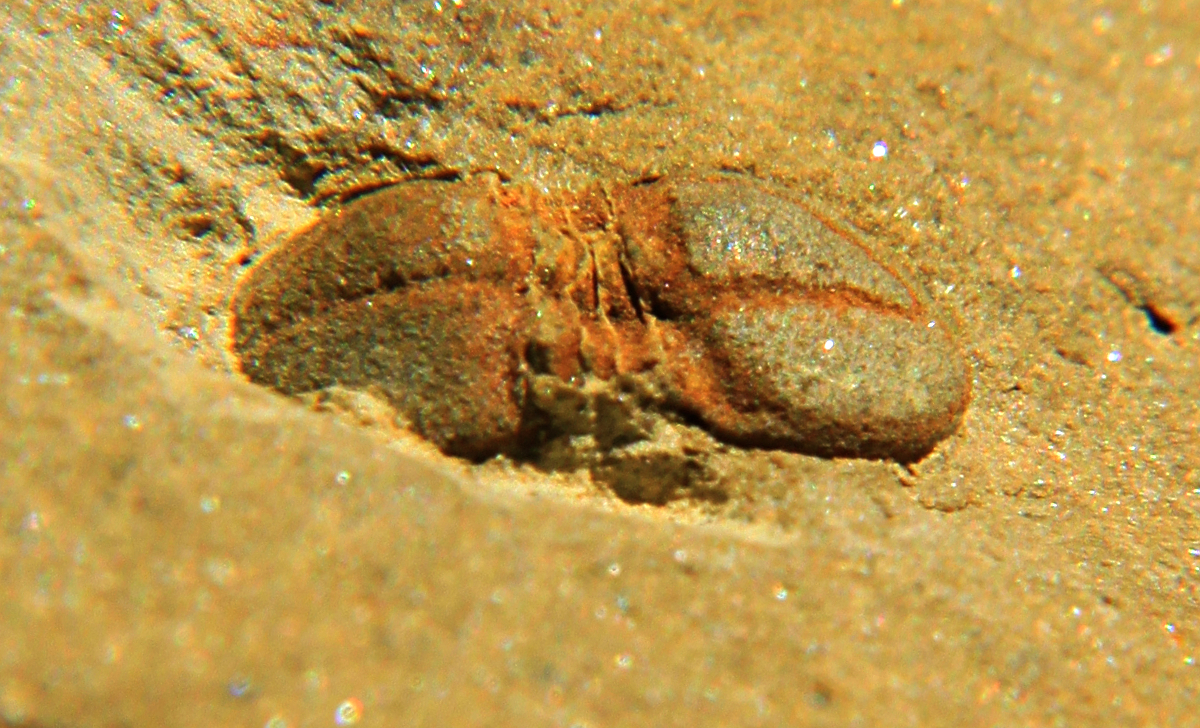
Internal moult of Morocconus notabilis, side view, 9 mm long

Like all Agnostida, Morocconus is diminutive and the headshield (or cephalon) and tailshield (or pygidium) are of approximately the same size (or isopygous) and outline. Like all Weymouthiidae, it lacks eyes and rupture lines (or sutures). The cephalon is subcircular except for the straight posterior. The external surface of the cephalon is smooth, convex, and is hanging over an extremely narrow border. The central raised area of the cephalon (or glabella) is evident on the internal mold by a clear defining furrow, long triangular in outline (about 1⅓× as long as the maximum width), with rounded tips and only one transverse furrow (SO). The occipital ring (LO) is short (measured along the length of the animal), and hangs over the posterior margin. The thorax has three segments, like all other Weymouthiidae for which the thorax is known. The pygidium is also externally smooth, and convex. The internal mold shows a long triangular axis, narrower than the glabella (about 1⅓× as long as the maximum width), with rounded tips extending to the posterior margin, and without visible segmentation. The pygidium has no border furrow.

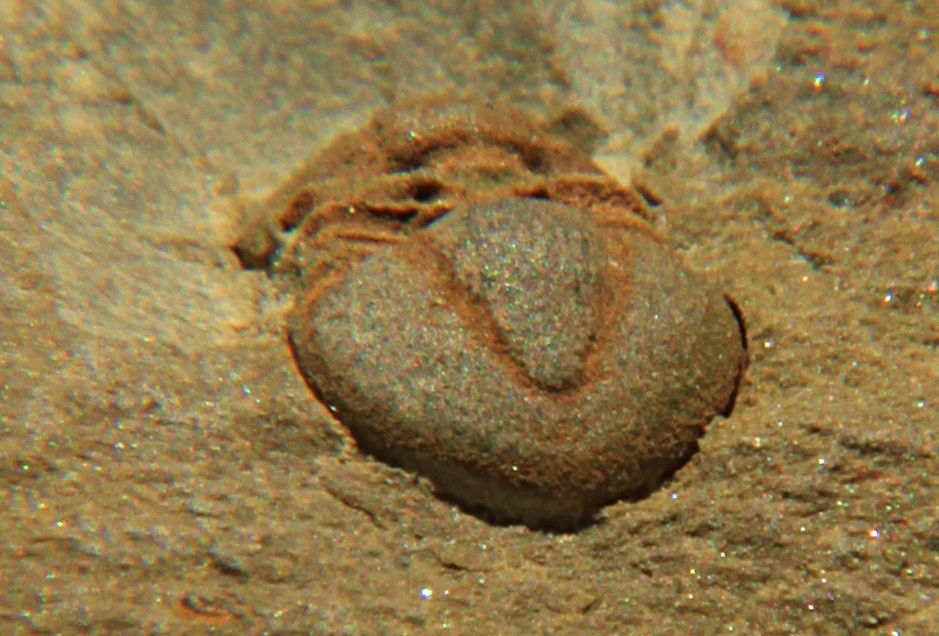
Internal moult of M. notabilis, frontal view, 5 mm wide
