= Semadiscus =

Semadiscus Temporal range: Lower Botomian

Scientific classification
- Domain: Eukaryota
- Kingdom: Animalia
- Phylum: Arthropoda
- Class: †Trilobita (?)
- Order: †Agnostida
- Family: †Weymouthiidae
- Genus: †Semadiscus; Romanenko, 1978

Species
- S. sollennis Romanenko, 1978 (type species)

Extinct genus of trilobites

Semadiscus is an extinct genus from a well-known class of fossil marine arthropods, the trilobites. It has been collected from the Lower Cambrian (early Botomian) of Canada (Newfoundland), Russia (Siberia, Gorno-Altaysk), and the United States (New York State). Only the headshield (or cephalon) is known, and it may well be that it would be better to include it in Serrodiscus.

== Description ==
Like all Agnostida, Semadiscus is diminutive. Like all Weymouthiidae, Semadiscus lacks eyes and rupture lines (or sutures). The cephalon is semi-elliptical. The central raised area (or glabella) tapers forward, and the space between its front and the furrow that defines the border is as wide as the frontal border. It carries a stout backward-directed spine that is as long and one eighth as wide as the glabella. The border is narrow (about 1/8× the length of the cephalon excluding the spine) but only half as wide at the back corners of the cephalon (or genal angles). The articulate middle part of the body (or thorax) and tailshield (or pygidium) are unknown.
