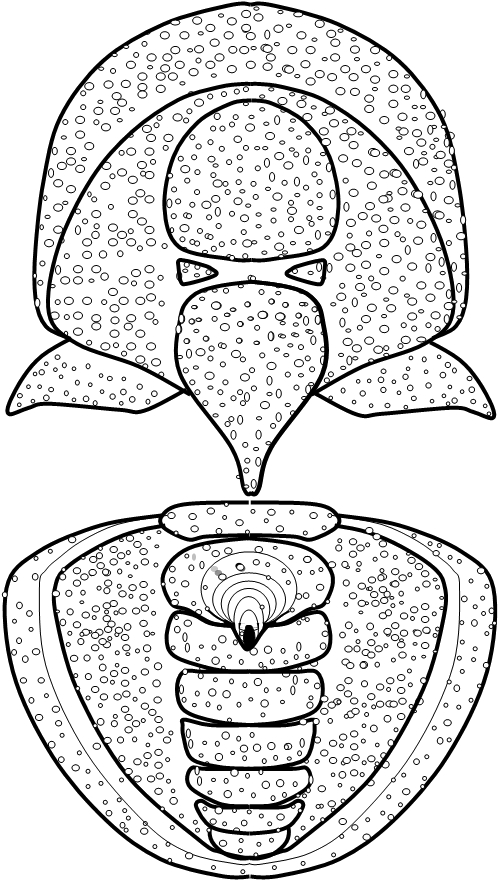
- Acimetopus bilobatus

Scientific classification
- Domain: Eukaryota
- Kingdom: Animalia
- Phylum: Arthropoda
- Class: †Trilobita (?)
- Order: †Agnostida
- Family: †Weymouthiidae
- Genus: †Acimetopus; Rasetti, 1966

Type species
- Acimetopus bilobatus Rasetti, 1966

= Acimetopus =

Acimetopus Temporal range: Botomian (Olenellus-zone)

Extinct genus of trilobites

Acimetopus is a genus of eodiscinid trilobite belonging to the family Weymouthiidae Kobayashi (1943), Order Agnostida Salter (1864). It lived during the Botomian stage. = late Lower Cambrian Stage 4 (upper of two stages subdividing the un-named Series 2); the upper Botomian boundary corresponds to base of the Middle Cambrian, Miaolingian Series and Wuliuan stage.

== Type species ==
Acimetopus bilobatus Rasetti, 1966, from his locality cs-4 in limestone beds which form several outcrops on a hillside at Griswold Farm, about 1 mile southeast of North Chatham, Columbia County, New York State, USA; the associated faunule is referred to as the Acimetopus bilobatus faunule due to the nominate species being one of the most common and characteristic trilobites.

== Distribution ==
Acimetopus is known from the Lower Cambrian of the United States (unnamed formation, East Chatham Quad, Columbia County, New York State 42°24′N 73°30′W), and England.

== Description ==
Like in all Agnostida, the body of Acimetopus is diminutive, the headshield (or cephalon) and tailshield (or pygidium) are approximately the same size (or isopygous). The thorax is unknown but all weymouthiids where it is known have 3 thoracic segments. Acimetopus has no eyes. Its cephalic border is strongly convex, with a pair of lateral marginal spines. The entire exoskeleton of Acimetopus is covered in granules. The central raised area of the cephalon, called the glabella, is strongly divided by two deep furrows that merge when crossing the midline. The large and inflated anterior lobe is isolated from border furrow. Behind it is a pair of small, separated, subtriangular lobes. The posterior part of the glabella is large and carries an inflated spine that is directed upwards and backwards. Genal spines are present. The axis of the pygidium (or rhachis) has nine rings that are strongly inflated, with the second ring carrying a vertical spine. The border surrounding the pygidium is defined by a deep furrow, is narrow, and lacks spines.

== Ecology ==
Acimetopus bilobatus occurs in association with other Weymouthiidae including (Acidiscus, Analox, Bathydiscus, Bolboparia, Leptochilodiscus, Serrodiscus), Calodiscus, and several species of Olenellus Billings, 1861, and Bonnia Walcott, 1916 (Family Dorypygidae).
