= Distagnostus =

Scientific classification
- Domain: Eukaryota
- Kingdom: Animalia
- Phylum: Arthropoda
- Class: †Trilobita (?)
- Order: †Agnostida
- Family: †Agnostidae
- Genus: †Distagnostus; Shergold, 1972

Extinct genus of trilobites

Distagnostus is a genus of trilobite in the order Agnostida, which existed in what is now Queensland, Australia. It was described by Shergold in 1972, and the type species is Distagnostus ergodes.
