= Toledodiscus =

Toledodiscus Temporal range: Cambrian Stage 4

Scientific classification
- Domain: Eukaryota
- Kingdom: Animalia
- Phylum: Arthropoda
- Class: †Trilobita (?)
- Order: †Agnostida
- Family: †Weymouthiidae
- Genus: †Toledodiscus
- Species: †T. valverdi

Binomial name
- †Toledodiscus valverdi Collantes & Pereira, 2025

Extinct genus of trilobites

Toledodiscus is an extinct genus of weymouthiid trilobite that lived during Cambrian Stage 4.

== Distribution ==
Toledodiscus valverdi fossils are known from the Soleras Formation of Spain.
