= Homagnostus =

Scientific classification
- Domain: Eukaryota
- Kingdom: Animalia
- Phylum: Arthropoda
- Class: †Trilobita (?)
- Order: †Agnostida
- Family: †Agnostidae
- Genus: †Homagnostus; Howell, 1935

Extinct genus of trilobites

Homagnostus is a genus of trilobites in the order Agnostida, which existed in what is now north Wales. It was described by Howell in 1935. The genus was originally considered to be Agnostus pisiformis var. obesus (Belt, 1867).
