= Biciragnostus =

Scientific classification
- Domain: Eukaryota
- Kingdom: Animalia
- Phylum: Arthropoda
- Class: †Trilobita (?)
- Order: †Agnostida
- Family: †Agnostidae
- Genus: †Biciragnostus; F. Ergaliev, 2001

Extinct genus of trilobites

Biciragnostus is a genus of trilobites in the order Agnostida, which existed in what is now Kazakhstan. It was described by F. Ergaliev in 2001, and the type species is Biciragnostus biformis.
