= Meniscuchus =

Meniscuchus Temporal range: Botomian

Scientific classification
- Domain: Eukaryota
- Kingdom: Animalia
- Phylum: Arthropoda
- Class: †Trilobita (?)
- Order: †Agnostida
- Family: †Weymouthiidae
- Genus: †Meniscuchus; Öpik, 1975

Species
- M. menetus Öpik, 1975 (type); M. fissifrons (Rasetti, 1966) synonym Calodiscus fissifrons; M. helena (Walcott, 1889) synonyms Microdiscus helena, Acimetopus helena, Calodiscus helena; M. nanus (Palmer, 1968) synonym Calodiscus nanus; M. reticulata (Rasetti, 1966)

Extinct genus of trilobites

Meniscuchus is an extinct genus from a well-known class of fossil marine arthropods, the trilobites. It lived during the Botomian stage, which lasted from approximately 522 to 516 million years ago. This faunal stage was part of the Cambrian Period. Meniscuchus has been found in the USA (Alaska, New York), Canada (Newfoundland, Quebec), Russia (Siberian Platform, Gorno-Altayskaya) and Australia (New South Wales).

== Distribution ==
- M. helena has been found in the Lower Cambrian of Canada (Newfoundland).
- M. menetus is known from the Lower Cambrian of Australia (Cymbric Vale Formation, New South Wales).
- M. nanus was collected in Alaska.

== Description ==
Like all Eodiscina, the headshield (or cephalon) and tailshield (or pygidium) are approximately equal in size. Like all Weymouthiidae, Meniscuchus is eyeless and lacks free cheeks. The axis of the cephalon (or glabella) is wide at its base (that is, where it would touch the thorax) and is rounded at the front, where it touches the border furrow. The glabella is divided by two furrows crossing the glabella, creating a frontal lobe (L4) more than twice as long (along the axis) as its narrow neighbour (L3). Further lobes (L2 and L1) may be suggested by a faint dent in the furrow defining the outline of the glabella. At the back the glabella is terminated by a narrow occipital ring (L0), extended backwards at midline with its margin a semicircle. The cephalic border is almost as wide as L4, but is only half as wide laterally while becoming slightly wider again further back. Thorax probably with three segments. Its pygidium is relatively long. Its axis is tapering and reaching the border furrow at midline, and is deeply segmented with 4 to 10 axial rings. The pleural areas are unfurrowed. The border of the pygidium is uniformly narrow. The doublure is wide and almost vertical.
