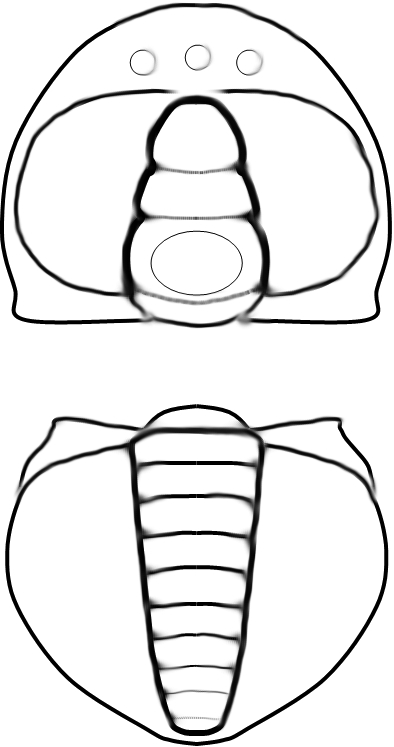
- A drawing of Ninadiscus strobulatus, cephalon and pygidium

Scientific classification
- Domain: Eukaryota
- Kingdom: Animalia
- Phylum: Arthropoda
- Class: †Trilobita (?)
- Order: †Agnostida
- Family: †Weymouthiidae
- Genus: †Ninadiscus; Korobov, 1980

Species
- N. strobulatus Korobov, 1980 (type)

= Ninadiscus =

Ninadiscus Temporal range: Botomian

Extinct genus of trilobites

Ninadiscus is a genus of Eodiscinid trilobite belonging to the family Weymouthiidae Kobayashi (1943), Order Agnostida Salter (1864). It lived during the Botomian Stage = late Lower Cambrian Stage 4 (upper of two stages subdividing the un-named Series 2); the upper Botomian boundary corresponds to the base of the Middle Cambrian, the Miaolingian Series and Wuliuan Stage.

== Distribution ==
Ninadiscus is known from the Lower Cambrian (Botomian) of northwestern Mongolia (Egyngolskaya Suite) and the USA (New York).

== Description ==
Like all Weymouthiidae, Ninadiscus lacks eyes and facial sutures, with the glabella tapering gently forward, rounded frontally and extending to the anterior border furrow. The cephalic border is broad frontally (sag.), bears three transversely arranged tubercles and narrows markedly towards posterior. Posterior cephalic margin is straight (tr.) and merely angulate abaxially. The occipital ring (L0) is short (sag). L1 is swollen and well-rounded. Two transglabellar furrows (S1 and S2) are well impressed (maximum cephalic width opposite S1). L2 is shorter than the frontal glabellar lobe (L3). Thorax unknown. The long and narrow pygidial axis is composed of 10 rings and almost reaches the posterior margin. The pleural fields are smooth and the pygidial border is absent except anteriorly.
