= Ivshinagnostus =

Scientific classification
- Kingdom: Animalia
- Phylum: Arthropoda
- Clade: †Artiopoda
- Class: †Trilobita (?)
- Order: †Agnostida
- Family: †Agnostidae
- Genus: †Ivshinagnostus; Ergaliev, 1980

Extinct genus of trilobites

Ivshinagnostus is a genus of trilobites in the order Agnostida, which existed in what is now Kazakhstan. It was described by Ergaliev in 1980, and the type species is Ivshinagnostus ivshini.
