= Runcinodiscus =

Runcinodiscus Temporal range: Late Botomian

Scientific classification
- Domain: Eukaryota
- Kingdom: Animalia
- Phylum: Arthropoda
- Class: †Trilobita (?)
- Order: †Agnostida
- Family: †Weymouthiidae
- Genus: †Runcinodiscus; Rushton, 1976

Species
- R. index

Genus of trilobite

Runcinodiscus Rushton (in Bassett et al. 1976, p. 636-7) is a genus of Lower Cambrian Eodiscinid trilobite belonging to the family Weymouthiidae (Kobayashi 1943), Order Agnostida (Salter 1864).

== Type species ==
By monotypy and original designation, Runcinodiscus index Rushton (in Bassett et al. 1976). Holotype is A 15360 in the collection of the Sedgwick Museum of Earth Sciences, University of Cambridge.

== Locality and age ==
The type specimen (Cobbold, 1931) was collected from the Protolenus Limestone (Ac5) [Comley Series], 180m south of Comley Quarry, near Church Stretton, Shropshire, England - grid reference SO 4849 9625 according to Morris (1988, p.205).

== Remarks ==
Fletcher & Theokritoff (2008) designated Shaw’s (1950, pl. 79, fig. 24) specimen of “ Weymouthia nobilis (Ford, 1872)” as the holotype of a new species, Serrodiscus weymouthioides, and considered Runcinodiscus Rushton (in Bassett et al., 1976) [= ?Weymouthia nobilis (Ford, 1872)] to be a junior synonym of Serrodiscus; Rushton (1976) had previously regarded Weymouthia and Runcinodiscus as closely allied with Serrodiscus. Weymouthia nobilis (Ford 1872), first described from the Taconic region of New York State, was also recorded by Cobbold (1931) from the Protolenus Limestone (Ac5) [Protolenid-Strenuellid Zone] at Comley, Shropshire, England, but Rushton (in Bassett et al., 1976, p. 637) showed that the English specimens are specifically distinct from W. nobilis as described by Ford (1872) and, with some reservation, erected new genus and species, Runcinodiscus index.

Runcinodiscus cf. index Rushton, described originally by Kiær (1917) as Weymouthia nobilis, was recovered from the Lower Cambrian Holmia Shale (Holmia Kjerulfi Assemblage-zone) at Tømten, close to Lake Mjøsa, Southeast Norway (Ahlberg, 1983, p. 289, fig. 1).
