= Phalacroma =

Scientific classification
- Domain: Eukaryota
- Kingdom: Animalia
- Phylum: Arthropoda
- Class: †Trilobita (?)
- Order: †Agnostida
- Family: †Agnostidae
- Genus: †Phalacroma; Hawle & Corda, 1847

Extinct genus of trilobites

Phalacroma is a genus of trilobite in the order Agnostida, which existed in what is now the Czech Republic. It was described by Hawle and Corda in 1867, and the type species is Phalacroma bibullatus, which was originally described as a species of Battus by Barrande in 1846.
