= Idolagnostus =

Scientific classification
- Domain: Eukaryota
- Kingdom: Animalia
- Phylum: Arthropoda
- Class: †Trilobita (?)
- Order: †Agnostida
- Family: †Agnostidae
- Genus: †Idolagnostus; Öpik, 1967

Species
- I. agrestis Öpik, 1967 (type); I. dryas Öpik, 1967; I. imitor (Shergold & Webers, 1992) synonym Obelagnostus imitor

Extinct genus of trilobites

Idolagnostus is a genus of trilobites in the order Agnostida, which existed in what is now Queensland, Australia. It was described by Öpik in 1967, and the type species is Idolagnostus agrestis.
