= Kymagnostus =

Scientific classification
- Domain: Eukaryota
- Kingdom: Animalia
- Phylum: Arthropoda
- Clade: †Artiopoda
- Class: †Trilobita (?)
- Order: †Agnostida
- Family: †Agnostidae
- Genus: †Kymagnostus; Hohensee, 1989

Extinct genus of trilobites

Kymagnostus is a genus of trilobites in the order Agnostida, which existed in what is now Arkansas, United States. It was described by Hohensee in 1989, and the type species is Kymagnostus harti.
