= Tannudiscus =

Tannudiscus Temporal range: Toyonian

Scientific classification
- Domain: Eukaryota
- Kingdom: Animalia
- Phylum: Arthropoda
- Class: †Trilobita (?)
- Order: †Agnostida
- Family: †Weymouthiidae
- Genus: †Tannudiscus; Pokrovskaya, 1959

Species
- T. tannulaicus Pokrovskaya, 1959 (type); T. altus Repina, 1964; T. balanus Rushton, 1966; T. bulla Gabova, 2004; T. conicus Zhou, 1982; T. dingus Zhuravleva, Zadorozhnaya, Osadchaya, Pokrovskaya, Rodionova & Fonin, 1967; T. extensus Zhuravleva, Zadorozhnaya, Osadchaya, Pokrovskaya, Rodionova & Fonin, 1967

Extinct genus of trilobites

Tannudiscus Pokrovskaya (1959) is a genus of eodiscinid trilobites belonging to the family Weymouthiidae Kobayashi T. (1943), Order Agnostida (Salter 1864). It lived during the late Lower Cambrian, with remains found in Canada (Newfoundland), China (Gansu), The United Kingdom (England), and the Russian Federation (Tuva, Gorno-Altayskaya).

TYPE SPECIES: T. tannulaicus Pokrovskaya, 1959.

== Taxonomy ==
The Weymouthiid family shows a trend of shortening the occipital ring. In Chelediscus and Tannudiscus the occipital ring is entirely obliterated as in the Agnostina suborder. Tannudiscus has some other characters it shares with the Agnostina, such as a glabella consisting of two lobes and the occipital ring divided into basal glabellar lobes. Both the glabella and pygidial axis are isolated from the border furrow, and the latter is undivided. It is therefore considered likely that the Agnostina descended directly from a species assignable to Tannudiscus. The earliest known Agnostina is Archaeagnostus (Peronopsidae). According to Cotton and Fortey (2005) Tannudiscus is polyphyletic.

== Description ==
Tannudiscus lacks eyes and has a thorax of three segments. The glabella almost touches the anterior border and consists of two inflated lobes, the frontal one slightly wider than the posterior lobe—a characteristic that is further developed in the Condylopygidae. Posterior glabellar lobe lacks a spine. The occipital ring is formed into two basal lateral lobes. The border is convex, moderately wide, more so in front of the glabella and extends to rear of the glabella in some species. Pygidial axis is conical, with seven or eight rings, and may or may not reach posterior border furrow. The furrows defining the axial rings are indistinct or obsolete. Pygidial border is almost flat, but similar in width to the cephalic border.

== Distribution ==
- T. tannulaicus is known from the Lower Cambrian of the Russian Federation (Toyonian (= Stage 4, upper of two stages subdividing the un-named Cambrian Series 2), Shivelikskaya Suite, Tuva, Shivelik-Khem River, eastern Tannu-Ola Mountains).
- T. balanus was originally described in the Lower Cambrian of England. Holotype is A 57119, held at the Sedgwick Museum of Earth Sciences, University of Cambridge; collected by Rushton from about 450m above base of the Purley Shale Formation, Camp Hill, St. Paul's Church, Stockingford, Nuneaton, Warwickshire, England [Closest ICS interval: Cambrian Series 3 – Terreneuvian Epoch]. The species also occurs in the Toyonian, upper Redland Cove member, Brigus Formation of southeastern Newfoundland and also has been found in the Lower Cambrian of the Russian Federation (Russian-Kazakhian Botomian Stage, Sanashtykgolskogo horizon, Shashkunarskaya suite).
- T. conicus has been recovered from the late Lower Cambrian of China (Huocheng Formation, Borohoro district).
- T. extensus is present in the Middle Cambrian of Russian Federation (Amgaian, Berikul Formation, Kiya River section, Kuznetsk Alatau).
