= Ammagnostidae =

Ammagnostidae Temporal range: Cambrian–Ordovician

Scientific classification
- Kingdom: Animalia
- Phylum: Arthropoda
- Clade: †Artiopoda
- Class: †Trilobita (?)
- Order: †Agnostida
- Suborder: †Agnostina
- Superfamily: †Agnostoidea
- Family: †Ammagnostidae; Opik, 1967

Genera
- Ammagnostus Öpik, 1967; Hadragnostus Öpik, 1967; Kormagnostus Resser, 1938; Proagnostus Butts, 1926

Family of trilobites

Ammagnostidae, a family of trilobites in the suborder Agnostina, were small, eyeless, and isopygous, with a thorax consisting of two segments.

The family has four genera:

Ammagnostus Öpik, 1967

- Ammagnostus psammius Öpik, 1967 (Type)
- Ammagnostus bassus (Öpik, 1967)
- Ammagnostus bella Guo & Luo, 1996
- Ammagnostus beltensis (Lochman, 1944)
- Ammagnostus cryptus
- Ammagnostus cylindratus Guo & Luo, 1996
- Ammagnostus duibianensis Lu & Lin, 1989
- Ammagnostus histus
- Ammagnostus hunanensis
- Ammagnostus integriceps Öpik, 1967
- Ammagnostus laiwuensis (Lorenz, 1906)
- Ammagnostus mitis Öpik, 1967
- Ammagnostus sinensis Peng, 1987
- Ammagnostus wangcunensis Peng & Robison

Hadragnostus Öpik, 1967

- Hadragnostus las Öpik, 1967 (Type)
- Hadragnostus edax Fortey & Rushton, 1976
- Hadragnostus helixensis Jago & Cooper, 2005
- Hadragnostus modestus (Lochman, 1944)

Kormagnostus Resser, 1938

- Kormagnostus simplex Resser, 1938 (Type)
- Kormagnostus boltoni Westrop et al., 1996
- Kormagnostus copelandi Westrop et al., 1996
- Kormagnostus flati Pratt, 1992
- Kormagnostus inventus Shergold, 1982
- Kormagnostus minutus (Schrank, 1975)
- Kormagnostus seclusus (Walcott, 1884)

Proagnostus Butts, 1926

- Proagnostus bulbus Butts, 1926 (Type)
- Proagnostus centerensis Resser, 1938
- Proagnostus maryvillensis Resser

These trilobites lived during the late Cambrian and Ordovician periods.
