= Obelagnostus =

Scientific classification
- Domain: Eukaryota
- Kingdom: Animalia
- Phylum: Arthropoda
- Class: †Trilobita (?)
- Order: †Agnostida
- Family: †Agnostidae
- Genus: †Obelagnostus; Shergold & Webers, 1992

Genus of trilobites

Obelagnostus is a genus of trilobites in the order Agnostida, which existed in what is now Antarctica. It was described by Shergold and Webers in 1992, and the type species is Obelagnostus imitor.
