= Aistagnostus =

Scientific classification
- Domain: Eukaryota
- Kingdom: Animalia
- Phylum: Arthropoda
- Class: †Trilobita (?)
- Order: †Agnostida
- Family: †Agnostidae
- Genus: †Aistagnostus; Xiang & Zhang, 1985

Extinct genus of trilobites

Aistagnostus is a genus of trilobites in the order Agnostida, which existed in what is now Xinjiang, China. It was described by Xiang and Zhang in 1985, and the type species is Aistagnostus laevigatus.
