= Hells Mouth Grits =

Geological formation in Wales

Hells Mouth Formation
- Stratigraphic range: Late lower Cambrian - protolenid-strenuellid Zone
- Type: Formation within the Harlech Grits Group
- Underlies: Manganiferous siltstones of the Trwyn y Fulfran Formation
- Overlies: Base not exposed; possibly rests unconformably on Neoproterozoic rocks
- Thickness: >190m

Lithology
- Primary: Greywackes.
- Other: Intercalated green and grey siltstones

Location
- Region: Wales
- Country: United Kingdom
- Extent: Pwllheli area, northwest Wales

Type section
- Named for: Porth Neigwl, also known in English as "Hell's Mouth"
- Named by: Young et al. (1994, p.337)

Nicholas (1915) described the geology of St. Tudwal's Peninsula (which protrudes from the southern coast of the main Llŷn Peninsula in Gwynedd North West Wales). He termed the oldest strata, exposed in the western cliffs of the peninsula, the 'Hell's Mouth Grits'. Bassett and Walton (1960) described the sedimentology and provenance, and Young et al. (1994, p. 337), redescribed the rocks and formalized the formational names, newly retitling the 'Hells Mouth Grits' as the Hells Mouth Formation. Correlated lithologically with upper part of the Rhinog Formation in the Harlech Dome, the grit beds exposed at St Tudwal's are very uniform in lithology and thickness when traced along the outcrops, with a gradual thinning southwards. They exhibit the characteristic textures and structures of greywackes but differ from the normal type in being relatively well sorted and commonly laminated. Intercalated mudstones are more variable both in thickness and in lithology and contain laminated mudstones rich in sponge remains. The sandstones have sharply defined bases, often bearing sole structures and occasionally loaded. Sandstone dykes cut down from the bases of some beds and extend through up to 0.6 m of underlying siltstones. The sandstones may form sheets up to 4 m thick, although a bed thickness of up to 1m is more usual, and have been interpreted as turbidites deposited by currents from the northeast (Bassett & Walton, 1960).

Type Section of the Hell's Mouth Formation is at Trwyn y Ffosle, 1 km north of Trwyn Careg-y-tir, where a relatively complete succession can be traced from sea-level (grid reference SH 2868 2482) to the manganese trials marking the line of outcrop of the overlying Trwyn y Fulfran Formation. The upper part of this section is not well exposed, so the section above Trwyn Carreg-y-tir (grid reference SH 2880 2401) has been used to define the base of the Trwyn y Fulfran Formation (Young et al., 1994, p. 337).

The Hells Mouth Formation has yielded fossils dating back to the Lower Cambrian period, including the trilobites Hamatolenus (Myopsolenus) douglasi Bassett et al. (1976, p. 627, pl.1, figs 1 - 8; pl. 2, figs. 1 - 4). Leptochilodiscus succinctus (described originally as Kerberodiscus succinctus gen. et sp. nov., Bassett et al., op. cit. p. 631, pl.2, figs. 6 - 14; pl. 3 figs. 1 - 4), and Serrodiscus ctenoa? Rushton, 1966, collected from 16.5 m below the base of the overlying Trwyn y Fulfran Formation at Trwyn Carreg-y-tir (grid reference SH 2876 2402). The fauna is of late lower Cambrian age and falls within the upper part of the protolenid-strenuellid Zone of the Comley Series of British nomenclature. East of Trwyn y Fossle acritarchs from the upper part of the Hell's Mouth Formation are often numerous but, at best, moderately well preserved (Young, et al., 1994, p. 338.).

== See also ==
- List of fossiliferous stratigraphic units in Wales
