= Quadrahomagnostus =

Quadrahomagnostus Temporal range: Dresbachian

Scientific classification
- Domain: Eukaryota
- Kingdom: Animalia
- Phylum: Arthropoda
- Class: †Trilobita (?)
- Order: †Agnostida
- Family: †Agnostidae
- Genus: †Quadrahomagnostus; Chu, 1959

Quadrahomagnostus is an extinct genus from a well-known class of fossil marine arthropods, the trilobites. They lived from 501 to 490 million years ago during the Dresbachian faunal stage of the late Cambrian period.
