= Eolotagnostus =

Scientific classification
- Domain: Eukaryota
- Kingdom: Animalia
- Phylum: Arthropoda
- Class: †Trilobita (?)
- Order: †Agnostida
- Family: †Agnostidae
- Genus: †Eolotagnostus; Zhou, 1982

Extinct genus of trilobites

Eolotagnostus is a genus of trilobites in the order Agnostida, which existed in what is now Gansu, China. It was described by Zhou in 1982, and the type species is Eolotagnostus gansuensis.
