= Battus (trilobite) =

Battus is a synonym for several agnostid trilobites, now assigned to other genera.

== Etymology ==
In Greek mythology, Battus is a shepherd who witnessed Hermes stealing Apollo's cattle. Because he broke his promise not to reveal this theft, Hermes turned him to stone.

== Taxonomy ==
Battus Barrande, 1846 was no longer available since Giovanni Antonio Scopoli used Battus in 1777 for a genus of swallowtail butterflies.

=== Trilobite species previously assigned to Battus ===
A number of species previously assigned to the genus Battus have since been transferred to other genera:

- B. bibullatus = Phalacroma bibullatus
- B. cuneiferus = Diplorrhina cuneifera
- B. granulatum = Pleuroctenium granulatum
- B. integer = Peronopsis integer
- B. laevigatus = Lejopyge laevigata
- B. nudus = Phalagnostus nudus
- B. rex = Condylopyge rex
- B. tardus = Trinodus tarda
