= Innitagnostus =

Scientific classification
- Kingdom: Animalia
- Phylum: Arthropoda
- Clade: †Artiopoda
- Class: †Trilobita (?)
- Order: †Agnostida
- Family: †Agnostidae
- Genus: †Innitagnostus; Öpik, 1967

Extinct genus of trilobites

Innitagnostus is a genus of trilobites in the order Agnostida, which existed in what is now Queensland, Australia. It was described by Öpik, 1967, and the type species is Innitagnostus innitens.
