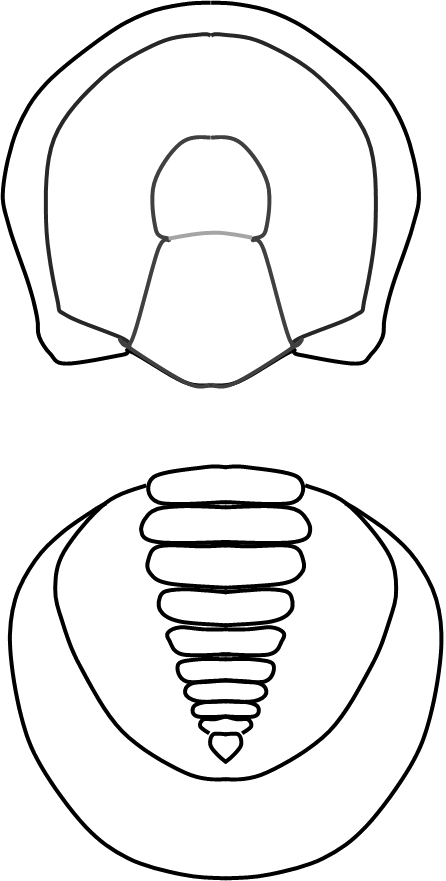
- Jinghediscus nummularius

Scientific classification
- Kingdom: Animalia
- Phylum: Arthropoda
- Clade: †Artiopoda
- Class: †Trilobita (?)
- Order: †Agnostida
- Family: †Weymouthiidae
- Genus: †Jinghediscus; Xiang & Zhang, 1985

Species
- J. nummularius Xiang & Zhang, 1985 (type species)

= Jinghediscus =

Jinghediscus Temporal range: early Middle Cambrian

Genus of trilobites

Jinghediscus Xiang & Zhang, 1985 is a genus of Eodiscinid trilobite belonging to the family Weymouthiidae Kobayashi T. (1943), Order Agnostida (Salter 1864) It lived during the lower Middle Cambrian, with remains found in China (Xinjiang) and Australia (Queensland).

== Species ==
Jinghediscus nummularius Xiang and Zhang, 1985.

== Description ==
Like all Weymouthiidae, Jinghediscus lacks eyes and facial sutures. Cephalon semi-elliptical. Glabella has one transglabellar furrow and inflated posterior lobe that widens towards rear. Preglabellar field broad (sag.) and confluent with uniformly wide (tr.) genal areas. Occipital ring (L0) ill-defined and without spine. cephalic border is only gently convex and of uniform width. Pygidium with strongly conical axis composed of ten axial rings; pleural fields smooth and defined from axis merely by a change in slope. Pygidial border broadens considerably towards rear and is wider (sag.) posteriorly than width (tr.) of the smooth pleural fields.
