= Gymnagnostus =

Scientific classification
- Domain: Eukaryota
- Kingdom: Animalia
- Phylum: Arthropoda
- Class: †Trilobita (?)
- Order: †Agnostida
- Family: †Agnostidae
- Genus: †Gymnagnostus; Robison & Pantoja-Alor, 1968

Extinct genus of trilobites

Gymnagnostus is a genus of trilobites in the order Agnostida, which existed in what is now Oaxaca, Mexico. It was described by Robison and Pantoja-Alor, in 1968, and the type species is Gymnagnostus gongros.
