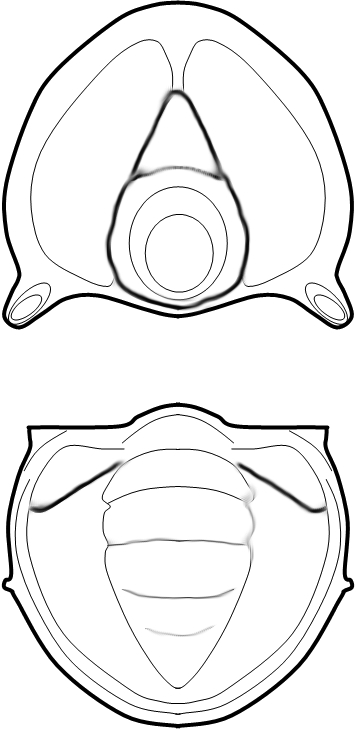
- A drawing of a cephalon and pygidium of Chelediscus acifer

Scientific classification
- Kingdom: Animalia
- Phylum: Arthropoda
- Clade: †Artiopoda
- Class: †Trilobita (?)
- Order: †Agnostida
- Family: †Weymouthiidae
- Genus: †Chelediscus; Rushton, 1966

Species
- C. acifer Rushton, 1966 (type); C. chathamensis Rasetti, 1967

= Chelediscus =

Chelediscus Temporal range: Late Botomian

Genus of trilobites

Chelediscus is a genus of Eodiscinid trilobite belonging to the family Weymouthiidae Kobayashi T. (1943), Order Agnostida Salter (1864). The Treatise assigns this genus to the Calodiscidae; Cotton and Fortey (2005) however move it to the Weymouthiidae. Chelediscus lived during the later part of the Botomian stage.

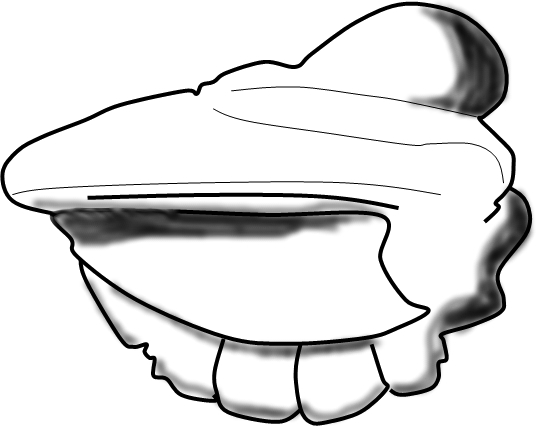
Drawing of Chelediscus acifer, enrolled, from the side

. Chelediscus is known from upper lower Cambrian strata in England, Newfoundland, New York State and Russia (Rushton, 1966; Fletcher, 2003; Rasetti, 1967; Jell in Kaesler, 1997;

== Distribution ==
- The holotype of C. acifer Rushton (1966, p. 19, pl. 2, figs. 26 a - e), is A 57104, held at the Sedgwick Museum of Earth Sciences, University of Cambridge and was collected by Rushton from about 450' above base of the Purley Shale Formation (Protolenus Biozone) at Camp Hill, St. Paul's Church, Stockingford, Nuneaton, Warwickshire, England [Closest ICS interval: Cambrian Series 3 – Terreneuvian Epoch].

C. acifer is also recorded from a Limestone at the top of the Torneträsk Formation, probably Ornamentaspis? linnarssoni Assemblage Zone, in the Luobakti section, south of Lake Torneträsk, northern Swedish Lapland and the lower to middle Brigus Formation (Hupeolenus Zone; Tannudiscus balanus Subzone) at Cape St Mary's, Newfoundland (Fletcher, 2003).

- C. chathamensis Rasetti (1967, p. 46, pl. 3, figs. 11 - 17) was recovered from the Malden Bridge road cut, on Columbia County Route 32, about one mile W. of Malden Bridge, New York State. In the eastern part of the cut, a few medium-grey, granular, 1-3 inch thick limestone beds yielded a rather large Lower Cambrian faunule very similar to the Acimetopus bilobatus faunule from limestone exposures on the Griswold farm, about 1 mile southeast of North Chatham, Columbia County, New York State, USA. The strata holding this faunule are referred to as the Leptochilodiscus punctulatus beds.
