= Cephalopyge =

Scientific classification
- Domain: Eukaryota
- Kingdom: Animalia
- Phylum: Mollusca
- Class: Gastropoda
- Order: Nudibranchia
- Suborder: Cladobranchia
- Family: Phylliroidae
- Genus: Cephalopyge; Hanel, 1905
- Species: C. trematoides

Binomial name
- Cephalopyge trematoides (Chun, 1889)

Synonyms
- Genus synonymy: Bonneviia Pruvot-Fol, 1929; Boopsis Pierantoni, 1923; Ctilopsis André, 1906; Dactylopus Bonnevie, 1921; Nectophyllirhoe Hoffmann, 1922; Species synonymy: Boopsis mediterranea Pierantoni, 1923; Ctilopsis picteti André, 1906; Dactylopus michaelsarsii Bonnevie, 1921; Phylliroe trematoides Chun, 1889; Cephalopyge arabica

Species of gastropod

Cephalopyge is a genus of pelagic nudibranchs comprising the single species Cephalopyge trematoides, a free-swimming marine gastropod in the family Phylliroidae.

== Etymology ==
Cephalopyge is a contraction of cephalus (Greek: κεφαλή kephale, "head") and pyge (πūγή, "behind") referring to the position of the anus close to the head. The species epithet trematoides expresses a likeness to flukes.

== Description ==
Cephalopyge trematoides grows to 2.5 cm (0.98 in) in length. It swims at approximately 12 cm/s (4.7 in/s), by passing several undulatory waves down its body each second. It is flattened and transparent; its internal organs are visible.

== Pelagic nudibranchs ==
Of the approximately 3000 species of nudibranch, the vast majority are benthic, only a couple are neustonic, and Cephalopyge trematoides is very unusual in that it is pelagic. It is estimated to be one of only five planktonic nudibranch species (another epipelagic example is Phylliroe bucephala).

Further information (including photos):

- Nudibranch Encyclopedia Kousuke Chibi (in Japanese)
- Seaslugs of Hawai'i by Cory Pittman and Pauline Fiene
