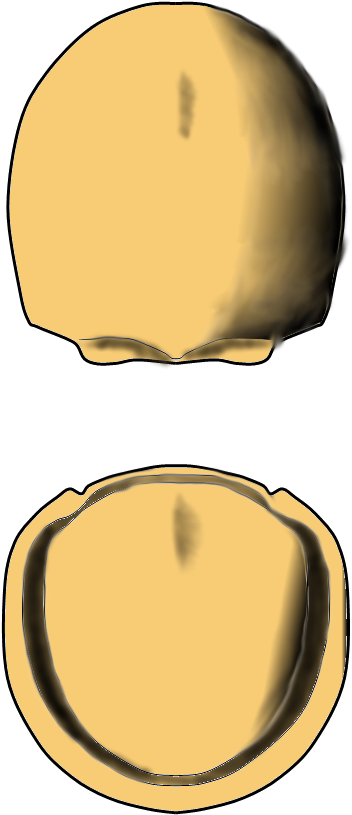
- Toragnostus bituberculatus from specimen from Andrarum, Skåne, Sweden

Scientific classification
- Kingdom: Animalia
- Phylum: Arthropoda
- Clade: †Artiopoda
- Class: †Trilobita (?)
- Order: †Agnostida
- Superfamily: †Agnostoidea
- Genus: †Toragnostus; Robison, 1988

Species
- T. bituberculatus (Angelin, 1851) synonyms Agnostus bituberculatus, Phalagnostus bituberculatus, Phoidagnostus bituberculatus; T. placidus Buchholz, 1997 (tentatively assigned)

= Toragnostus =

Toragnostus Temporal range: late Middle Cambrian

Extinct genus of trilobites

Toragnostus is a genus of trilobites restricted to the late Middle Cambrian. Its remains have been found in the United States, Greenland, Denmark, China, Sweden, the Russian Federation, and Kazakhstan. Its headshield and tailshield are almost completely effaced and it has two thorax segments.

== Distribution ==
- T. bituberculatus occurs in the late Middle Cambrian of the United States (Hillard Peak area, Alaska) Greenland (Lejopyge laevigata-zone, Holm Dal Formation, West Peary-land), Denmark, China (Hunan), Sweden (Jincella brachymetopa-zone, Andrarum, Skåne), the Russian Federation (C. oriens and A. henrici-zones, Siberian Platform, and Bennett Island), and Kazakhstan (Mayan, Tian Shan Range).

== Description ==
Like all Agnostida, Toragnostus is diminutive, with the headshield (or cephalon) and tailshield (or pygidium) of approximately the same size (or isopygous) and outline. Like all Agnostina, Toragnostus has only two thorax segments. The cephalon and pygidium are almost completely effaced, lacking a cephalic border and with wide pygidial border. The cephalon is strongly convex. The central raised area of the cephalon (or glabella) is outlined at the rear, narrow and tapering forward. It carries an elongated median node, clearly in the front half of the cephalon. The pygidial axis (or rhachis) is very broad, with the frontal lobe (M1) defined by a furrow crossing the axis. There is a weak elongated node on the rhachis.
