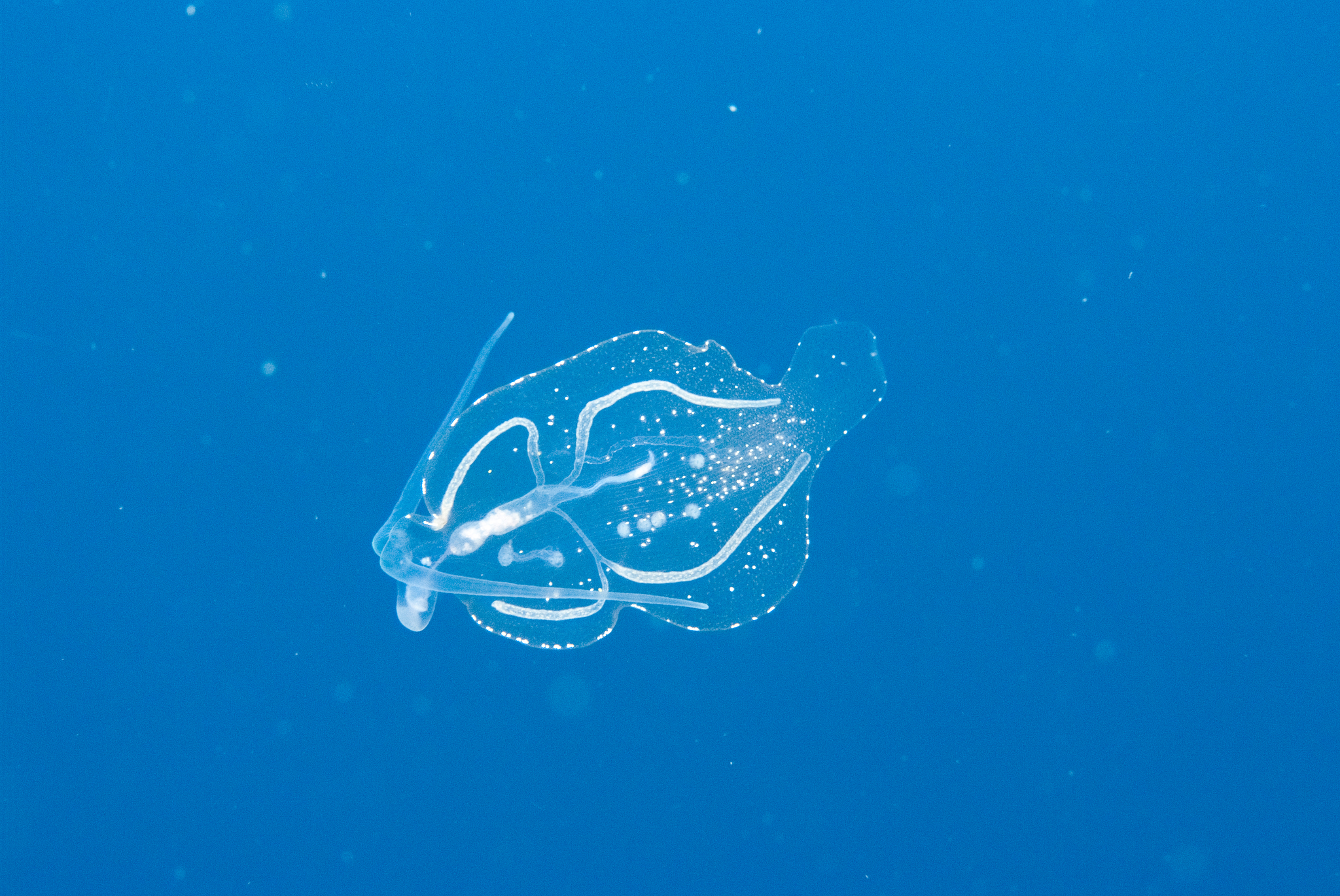

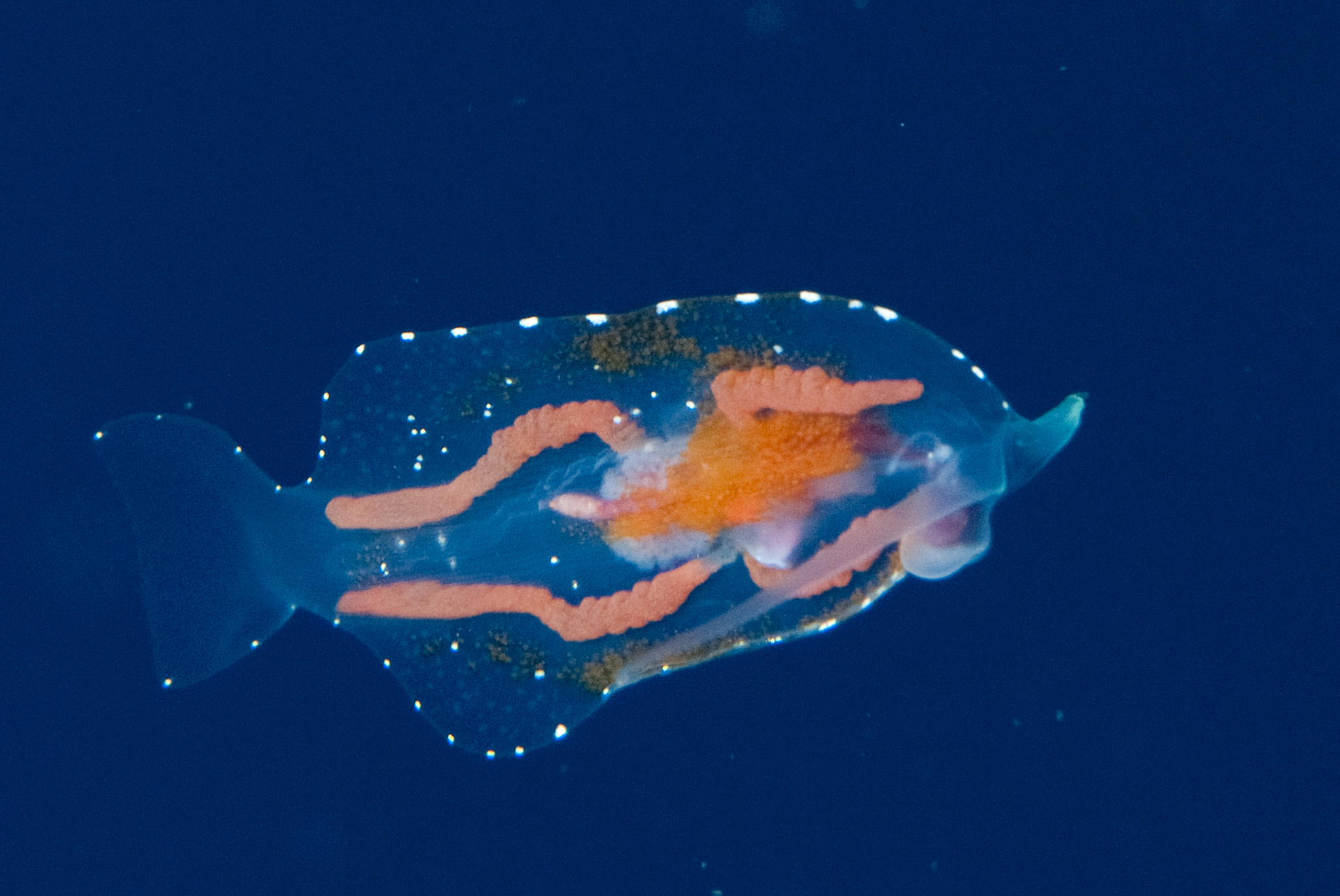
- Phylliroe bucephalum, Mozambique

Scientific classification
- Kingdom: Animalia
- Phylum: Mollusca
- Class: Gastropoda
- Order: Nudibranchia
- Suborder: Dendronotacea
- Family: Phylliroidae
- Genus: Phylliroe; Péron & Lesueur, 1810

Species
- Phylliroe bucephalum Péron & Lesueur, 1810 (Type); Phylliroe atlantica Bergh, 1871

= Phylliroe =

Genus of gastropods

Phylliroe is a genus of average sized (up to 5.5 centimetres or 2.2 inches), highly transparent pelagic nudibranchs, marine gastropod molluscs in the order Opisthobranchia, that consists of two known species. It is notable for being an open-ocean hunter that resembles a fish in body plan and locomotion, an example of convergent evolution.

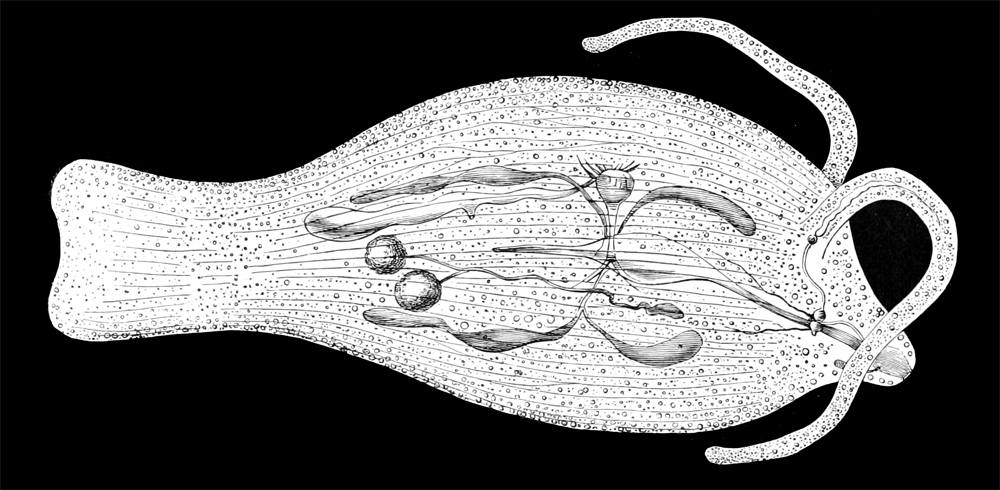
Illustration of Phylliroe bucephalum

== Distribution and habitat ==
- P. atlantica occurs in the (sub) tropical waters of the Atlantic and Pacific oceans.
- P. bucephalum is known from the Mediterranean.

== Ecology ==
Juveniles of P. bucephalum are found exclusively feeding on the bell of the hydromedusa Zanclea costata (this junior synonym was given precedence over Mnestra parasites). At first the nudibranch is attached to the inside of the bell of the medusa with its very small foot. It sucks tissue from the ring, radial canals and manubrium of the medusa and grows from 1.6 mm to 11 mm in just ten days, while the medusa shrinks. When the slug is as big as the medusa, it starts to swim, eating the remaining parts, including the tentacles.

In adulthood its diet is no longer restricted to Zanclea, although observations of feeding behaviour are sparse. Phylliroe uses its rhinophores (long horns) to prey on jellies, and the nearly vestigial remnant of its foot to adhere to the jelly prey. Phylliroe has been seen approaching a swarm of the larvacean Oikopleura albicans from below, grabbing a specimen with its paired denticulate jaws and swallowing it in half a minute. Adults have also been observed to prey on the medusa Aequoria.

Branches of the digestive tract may contain symbiontic zooxanthellae, but this relationship has not yet been studied. It is unclear whether all specimens of P. bucephalum harbor these symbionts. It is possible they are obtained from their prey.

P. bucephalum sometimes suffers from parasitic trematodes, both attached to its skin and inside its body.

== See also ==
- Lancelet
