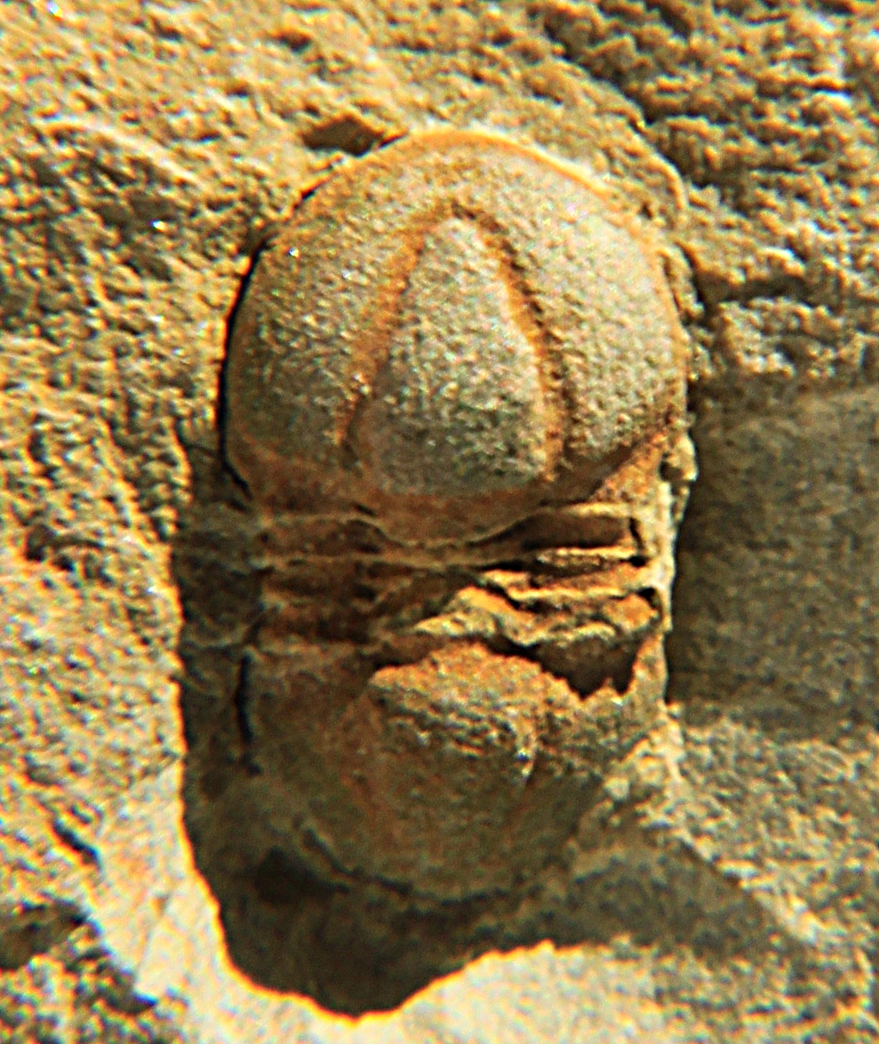
- Morocconus, from Morocco

Scientific classification
- Kingdom: Animalia
- Phylum: Arthropoda
- Clade: †Artiopoda
- Class: †Trilobita (?)
- Order: †Agnostida
- Suborder: †Eodiscina
- Superfamily: †Eodiscoidea
- Family: †Weymouthiidae; Kobayashi 1943

Genera
- †Abakolia; †Acidiscus; †Acimetopus; †Analox; †Bathydiscus; †Bolboparia; †Chelediscus; †Cobboldites; †Leptochilodiscus; †Litometopus; †Mallagnostus; †Meniscuchus; †Morocconus; †Ninadiscus; †Oodiscus; †Paracalodiscus; †Pseudocobboldia; †Runcinodiscus; †Semadiscus; †Serrodiscus; †Stigmadiscus; †Tannudiscus; †Toledodiscus; †Weymouthia

Synonyms
- † Ladadiscinae Soloviev 1964.

= Weymouthiidae =

Weymouthiidae Temporal range: Botomian/Delamaran (Olenellus- and Eokochaspis-zones)

Extinct family of arthropods

The Weymouthiidae are an extinct family of eodiscinid agnostid trilobites. They lived during the late Lower Cambrian and earliest Middle Cambrian (Botomian to Delamaran) in the so-called Olenellus- and Eokochaspis-zones in the former paleocontinents of Laurentia, Avalonia, Gondwana. The Weymouthiidae are all blind and lack free cheeks.

== Taxonomy ==
=== Ancestors ===
The Weymouthiidae have developed from a stock within the Hebediscidae.

=== Descendants ===
The Weymouthiidae are a paraphyletic family because the Agnostina suborder is nested within it, particularly in the clade that further consists of the genera Mallagnostus, Chelediscus, Tannudiscus and Jinghediscus. The trend in the Weymouthiidae to reduce the occipital ring is carried furthest in Chelediscus, Tannudiscus and the Agnostina with the occipital ring divided into basal lobes.

== Description ==
The family is named after the type genus, Weymouthia, which is named after Weymouth, Massachusetts. Most taxa in this family are small (1–2 cm or 0.4–0.8 inches long), but this is large for the Eodiscina. The glabella is wide at its base, normally parallel sided but may taper gently or be at its widest at half length. Glabellar furrows are mainly absent, but incomplete furrows may be present in some species and deeply impressed transglabellar furrows also occur. Free cheeks (or fixigenae) are normally confluent in front of glabella. The occipital ring may be simple or split into two lateral lobes (e. g. in Chelediscus and Tannudiscus). All Weymouthiidae lack eyes. The thorax consists of three rings when known (Mallagnostus, Marocconus, Serrodiscus, Tannudiscus and Weymouthia). The pygidial axis is long and strongly tapered with 10 or more axial rings. The segmentation of the axis, however, is often effaced. The Weymouthiidae include forms with the rear of the glabella roundly expanded over the occipital ring or with a vertical spine, forms in which the occipital ring cannot be discerned because the glabella is expanded, and forms with a primitive occipital structure but with a greatly increased numbers of axial segments.
