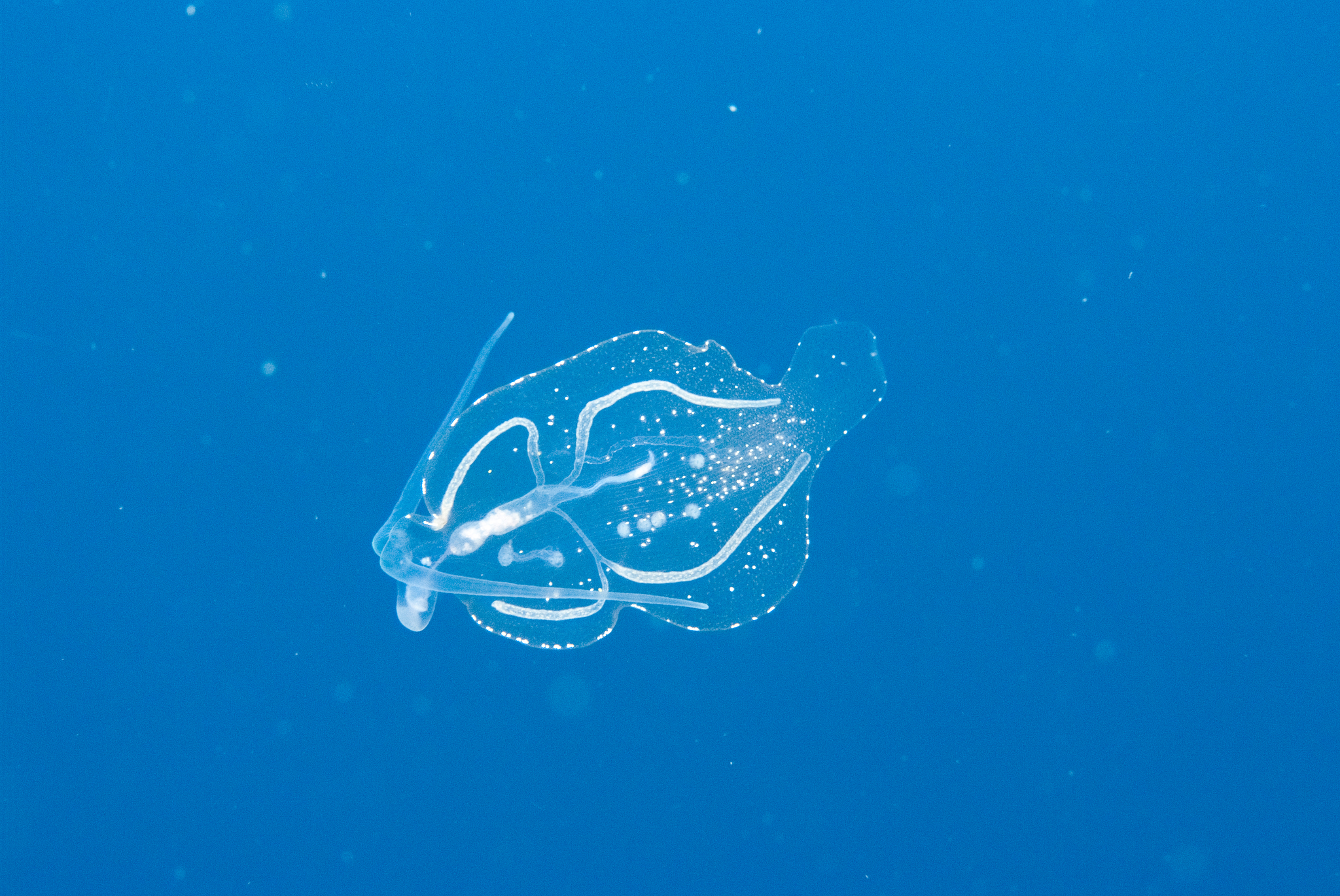

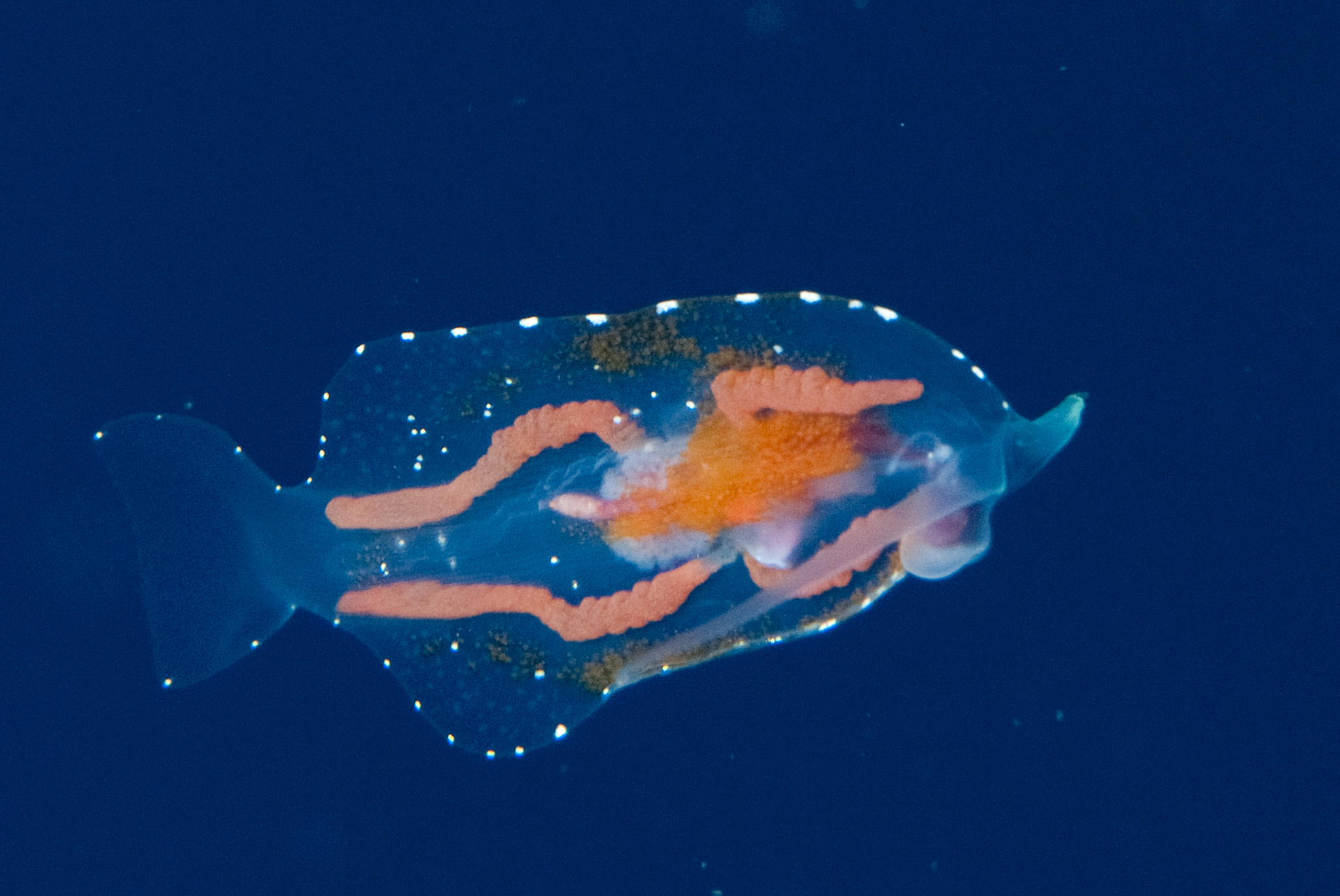
- Phylliroe bucephalum, Mozambique

Scientific classification
- Kingdom: Animalia
- Phylum: Mollusca
- Class: Gastropoda
- Order: Nudibranchia
- Suborder: Dendronotacea
- Superfamily: Dendronotoidea
- Family: Phylliroidae; Menke, 1830

Genera
- See Genera

= Phylliroidae =

Family of gastropods

Phylliroidae is a family of nudibranchs, shell-less marine gastropod molluscs or sea slugs, in the superfamily Dendronotoidea. They are highly adapted to a pelagic lifestyle and occur in tropical surface waters around the globe. The two genera assigned to this family, Phylliroe and Cephalopyge, are relatively small in size (up to 5.5 centimetres (2.2 in)), slender and highly transparent. They swim by undulating their whole body. Their foot is very small, which helps to reduce drag. They are carnivores that prey on planktonic jelly fish.

== Taxonomy ==
A 2020 molecular analysis recovered Phylliroidae within Dendronotida (currently referred to as Dendronotoidea).

== Genera ==
The following genera are recognised in the family Phylliroidae:

- Cephalopyge Hanel, 1905
- Phylliroe F. Péron & Lesueur, 1810
