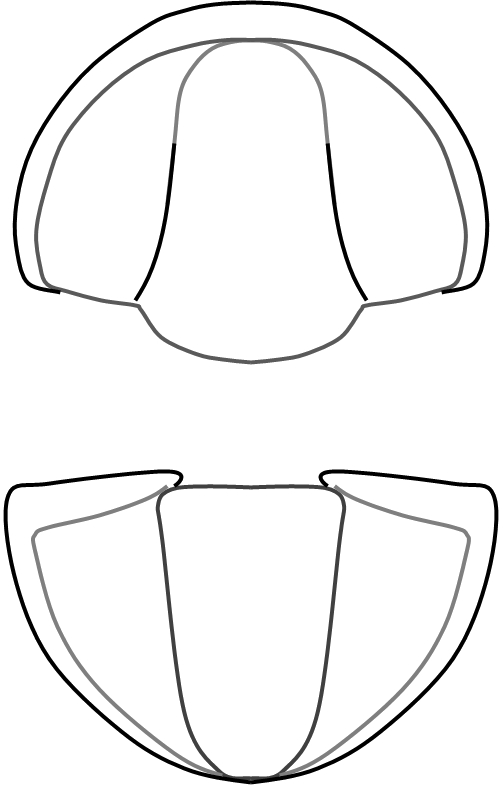
- drawing of Cobboldites comleyensis

Scientific classification
- Kingdom: Animalia
- Phylum: Arthropoda
- Clade: †Artiopoda
- Class: †Trilobita (?)
- Order: †Agnostida
- Family: †Weymouthiidae
- Genus: †Cobboldites; Kobayashi, 1943

Species
- C. comleyensis (Cobbold, 1910); C. itsariensis Geyer, 1988.

Synonyms
- Microdiscus comleyensis

= Cobboldites =

Cobboldites Temporal range: Botomian

Extinct genus of trilobites

Cobboldites is a genus of eodiscinid trilobite belonging to the family Weymouthiidae, order Agnostida. It lived during the Botomian stage, which lasted from approximately 524 to 518.5 million years ago. This faunal stage was part of the Cambrian Period.

== Species ==
Cobboldites comleyensis (Cobbold, 1910) is from the lower Cambrian of Comley Quarry (grid reference SO 482 964), Shropshire, England.

Cobboldites itsariensis Geyer, 1988. is from the Lower Cambrian of Morocco.
