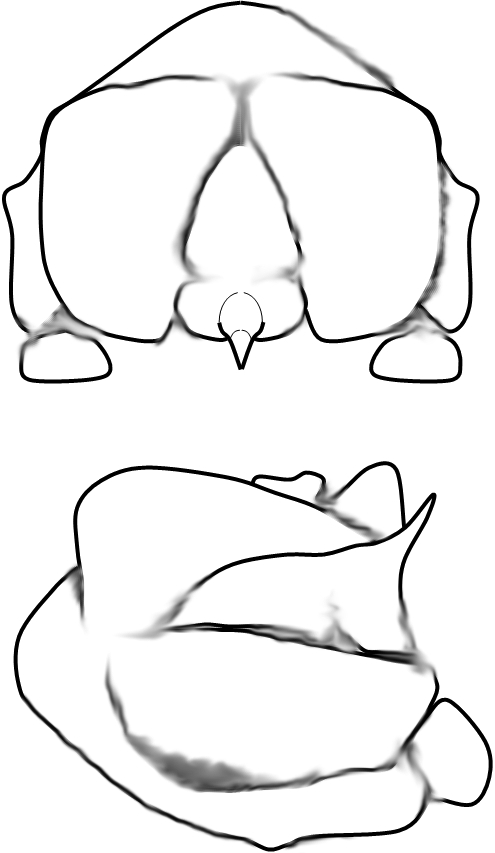
- Bolboparia superba, top cephalon dorsal view, bottom cephalon oblique view

Scientific classification
- Domain: Eukaryota
- Kingdom: Animalia
- Phylum: Arthropoda
- Class: †Trilobita (?)
- Order: †Agnostida
- Family: †Weymouthiidae
- Genus: †Bolboparia; Rasetti, 1966

Species
- B. superba Rasetti, 1966 (type); B. canadensis Rasetti, 1966; B. elongata Rasetti, 1966

= Bolboparia =

Bolboparia Temporal range: Botomian (Olenellus-zone)

Bolboparia is an extinct genus of eodiscinid agnostid trilobites. It lived during the late Lower Cambrian in what today Canada and the United States.

== Taxonomy ==
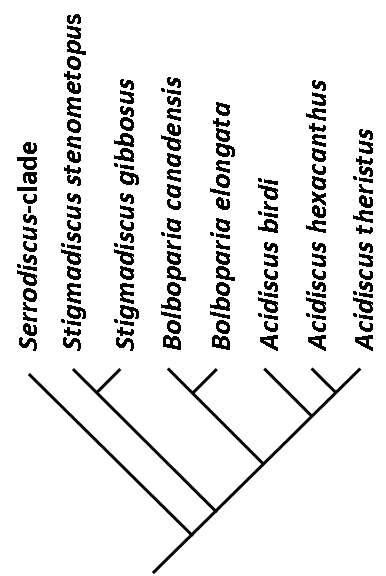
A cladogram showing the relationship between several species of the genera Acidiscus, Bolboparia and Stigmadiscus

Bolboparia is most closely related to Acidiscus and slightly more distantly to Stigmadiscus.

== Description ==
Like all Agnostida, Bolboparia is diminutive and the headshield (or cephalon) and tailshield (or pygidium) are of approximately the same size (or isopygous) and outline. Like all Weymouthiidae, Bolboparia lacks eyes and rupture lines (or sutures). The short, downsloping glabella and the bulging cheeks give it a very peculiar aspect.

== Distribution ==
- Bolboparia superba and B. elongata are both known from the Lower Cambrian of the United States (unnamed formation, East Chatham Quad, Columbia County, New York State 42°24′N 73°30′W).
- Bolboparia canadensis is only known from the Lower Cambrian of Canada (Olenellus-zone, calcarenite bed a half mile north of Elgin Station, south shore of the St. Lawrence River in Quebec).
