= Charles E. Resser =

American paleontologist

- Born: 28 April 1889; East Berlin, Pennsylvania, US
- Died: 18 September 1943 (aged 54); Washington, DC, US
- Scientific career
- Fields: Paleontology
- Workplaces: United States National Museum

Charles Elmer Resser (28 April 1889 – 18 September 1943) was an American paleontologist, born in East Berlin, Pennsylvania. He was educated at Pennsylvania State Teachers College (graduation in 1912), Franklin and Marshall College (B.A., 1913), Princeton University (M.A., 1915) and George Washington University (Ph.D., 1917). Resser developed an interest in Cambrian fossils when he was a student of H. Justin Roddy at Franklin and Marshall College.

== Career ==
In 1914 Resser came to the United States National Museum as an assistant to Walcott. He was appointed Assistant Curator in the Division of Paleontology in 1915. Further positions were Assistant Curator, Division of Stratigraphic Paleontology (1923), Associate Curator, Division of Stratigraphic Paleontology (1924-1928), Curator, Division of Stratigraphic Paleontology (1929-1940); and Curator, Division of Invertebrate Paleontology and Paleobotany (1941-1943). Resser was a part-time faculty member at George Washington University from 1915 to 1932. At the University of Maryland Resser taught geology for a number of years.

== Works ==
- New Lower and Middle Cambrian crustacea. Proceedings of the United States National Museum, Vol. 76, Art. 9, 1929, 18 pp., 7 pls.
- Charles D. Walcott: Addenda to descriptions of Burgess shale fossils (with explanatory notes by Charles E. Resser). Smithsonian Miscellaneous Collections, Vol. 85, No. 3, 1931, 46 pp., 23 pls., 11 text figs
