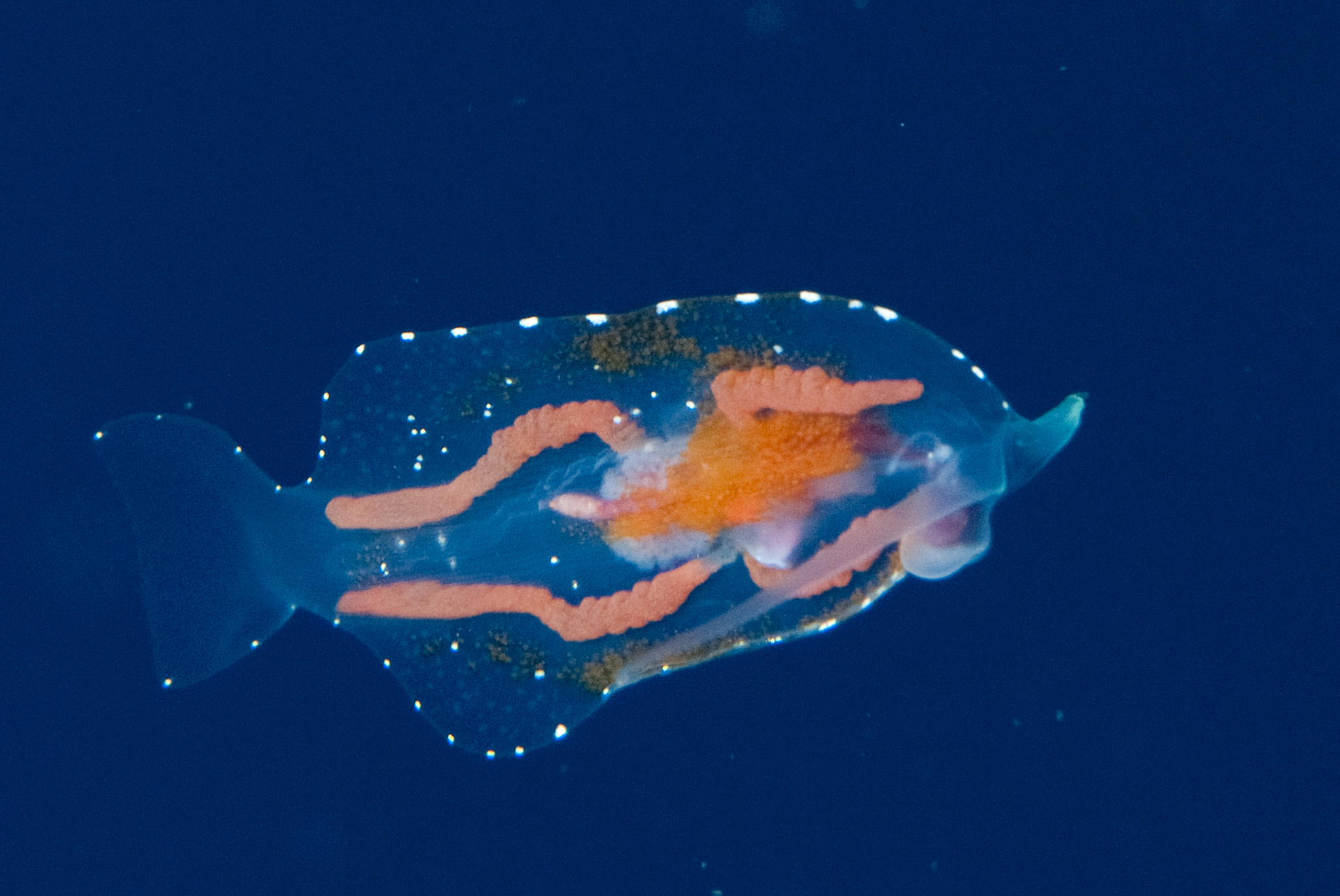

Scientific classification
- Kingdom: Animalia
- Phylum: Mollusca
- Class: Gastropoda
- Order: Nudibranchia
- Suborder: Dendronotacea
- Family: Phylliroidae
- Genus: Phylliroe
- Species: P. bucephala

Binomial name
- Phylliroe bucephala Lamarck, 1816

Synonyms
- List: Phylliroe bucephale Peron and Lesueur, 1810; Phylliroe bucephalum Péron & Lesueur, 1810; Phylliroe roseum d'Orbigny, 1836; Phylliroe sanzoi Sparta, 1925

= Phylliroe bucephala =

Species of gastropod

Phylliroe bucephala is a parasitic species of pelagic nudibranch, a marine gastropod mollusc in the family Phylliroidae.

== Biology ==
This species of nudibranch is transparent with its guts visible through the laterally flattened body. It has a tail and two long smooth rhinophores. It feeds on jellyfish and plankton as an adult. The juveniles parasitize Zanclea medusae.
