= Stigmadiscus =

Stigmadiscus Temporal range: Botomian

Scientific classification
- Domain: Eukaryota
- Kingdom: Animalia
- Phylum: Arthropoda
- Class: †Trilobita (?)
- Order: †Agnostida
- Family: †Weymouthiidae
- Genus: †Stigmadiscus; Rasetti, 1966

Extinct genus of arthropod

Stigmadiscus Rasetti, 1966, is a genus of Lower Cambrian Eodiscinid trilobite belonging to the family Weymouthiidae Kobayashi (1943) Order Agnostida (Salter 1864) It lived during the Botomian stage, = late Lower Cambrian Stage 4 (upper of two stages subdividing the un-named Series 2); the upper Botomian Stage boundary corresponds to base of both the Middle Cambrian Wuliuan stage and Miaolingian Series.

Stigmadiscus resembles Acidiscus in having a relatively short glabella, distinct S1 and S2 lateral furrows, and a slender occipital spine. In fact, according to Cotton & Fortey (2005, fig. 3) consensus is that Stigmadiscus and Bolboparia Rasetti, 1966, are sister taxa of Acidiscus.
