= Leptochilodiscus =

Leptochilodiscus Temporal range: Botomian (Olenellus-zone)

Scientific classification
- Kingdom: Animalia
- Phylum: Arthropoda
- Clade: †Artiopoda
- Class: †Trilobita (?)
- Order: †Agnostida
- Family: †Weymouthiidae
- Genus: †Leptochilodiscus; Rasetti, 1966

Type species
- Leptochilodiscus punctulatus Rasetti, 1966

Species
- Leptochiloduscus punctulatus Rasetti, 1966; Leptochilodiscus succinctus (Bassett et al., 1967)

Synonyms
- Kerberodiscus Bassett et al., 1976

Extinct genus of arthropods

Leptochilodiscus [= Kerberodiscus Bassett et al., 1976] is a genus of Lower Cambrian eodiscinid trilobite belonging to the family Weymouthiidae, order Agnostida. It lived during the Botomian stage = late Lower Cambrian Stage 4 (upper of two stages subdividing the unnamed Series 2); the upper Botomian Stage boundary corresponds to base of both the Middle Cambrian Wuliuan stage and Miaolingian Series.

== Type species ==
Leptochilodiscus punctulatus Rasetti, 1966, from the Late Lower Cambrian of New York State. Holotype: U.S.N.M. 146009. Paratypes: U.S.N.M. 146010 and 146011.

== Distribution ==
Leptochilodiscus punctulatus Rasetti (1966, p. 26, Pl. 1, fig. 5; pl. 11, figures 1 - 7), the title erroneously printed Leptochilodiscus punctulatis [sic.], is part of a trilobite faunule that was collected from limestone beds which form several outcrops in a hillside on Griswold farm, about 1 mile southeast of North Chatham, Columbia County, New York State, USA; the faunule is referred to as the Acimetopus bilobatus faunule after one of the most common and characteristic trilobites. The Acimetopus bilobatus faunule is notable for the number and variety of trilobites of the family Eodiscidae.

Leptochilodiscus succinctus (Bassett et al., 1976, p. 632, pl. 2, figs. 11 a - c) was collected from the upper part of the Hells Mouth Formation, 16.5 m below the base of the overlying Trwyn y Fulfran Formation at Trwyn Carreg-y-tir (grid reference SH 2876 2402), Llŷn Peninsula, North West Wales . The fauna is of late lower Cambrian age and falls within the upper part of the protolenid-strenuellid Zone of the Comley Series of British nomenclature. L. succinctus was originally described by Bassett et al., (op. cit.) as Kerberodiscus succinctus gen. et sp. nov.
