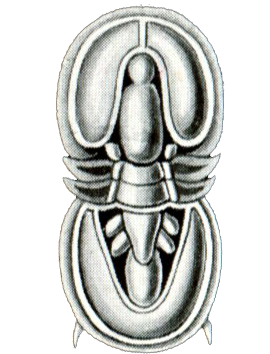
- Agnostus pisiformis

Scientific classification
- Kingdom: Animalia
- Phylum: Arthropoda
- Clade: †Artiopoda
- Class: †Trilobita (?)
- Order: †Agnostida
- Suborder: †Agnostina
- Superfamily: †Agnostoidea
- Family: †Agnostidae; McCoy, 1849

Synonyms
- Micragnostidae Howell, 1935, Glyptagnostidae Whitehouse, 1936, Rudagnostidae Lermontova, 1951

= Agnostidae =

Agnostidae Temporal range: Middle Cambrian – Middle Ordovician, 508–460 Ma

Agnostidae is a family of Agnostida trilobites. Like all Agnostina, they were eyeless and had only two thoracic segments. These trilobites inhabited benthic waters worldwide from 508 to 461 million years ago. The family includes the following genera, among others:

- Acmarhachis
- Agnostus
- Aistagnostus
- Anglagnostus
- Biciragnostus
- Connagnostus
- Distagnostus
- Eolotagnostus
- Gymnagnostus
- Homagnostus
- Idolagnostus
- Innitagnostus
- Ivshinagnostus
- Kymagnostus
- Lotagnostus
- Micragnostus
- Obelagnostus
- Oncagnostus
- Phalacroma
- Phalagnostus
- Quadrahomagnostus
- Raragnostus
- Semagnostus
- Strictagnostus
- Trilobagnostus
