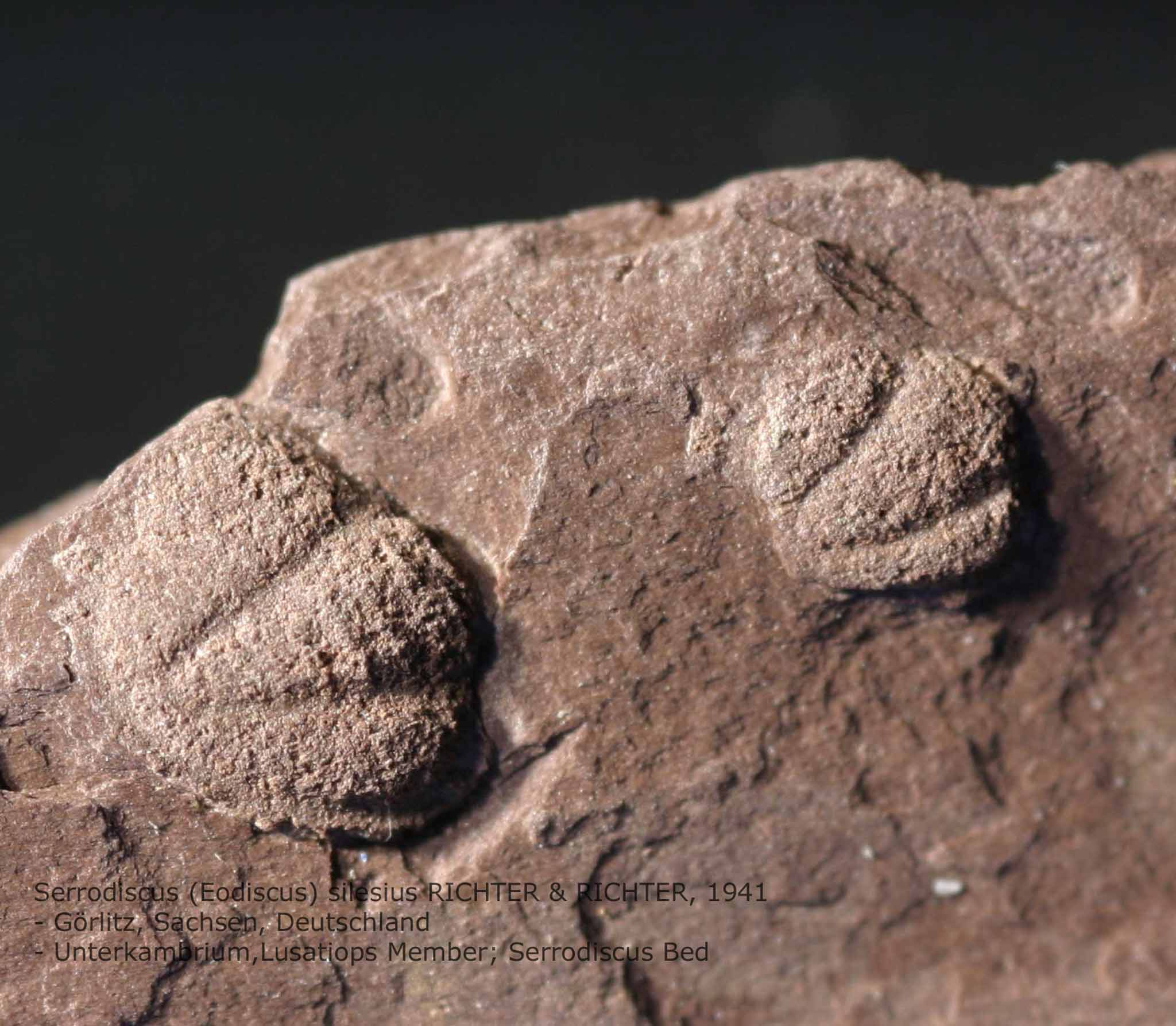
- Pygidia of Serrodiscus silesius

Scientific classification
- Kingdom: Animalia
- Phylum: Arthropoda
- Clade: †Artiopoda
- Class: †Trilobita (?)
- Order: †Agnostida
- Family: †Weymouthiidae
- Genus: †Serrodiscus; Richter & Richter, 1941

Species
- See text

Synonyms
- Paradiscus Kobayashi, 1943 [type: Microdiscus speciosus Ford, 1872]

= Serrodiscus =

Serrodiscus Temporal range: Lower Cambrian

Extinct genus of trilobites

Serrodiscus Richter and Richter 1941. is a genus of eodiscinid trilobite belonging to the family Weymouthiidae Kobayashi T. (1943), Order Agnostida (Salter 1864). It lived during the late Lower Cambrian, with remains found in Canada (Newfoundland & Nova Scotia), China (Gansu), The United Kingdom (England), Germany (Silesia), Poland (Holy Cross Mountains), the Russian Federation (Tuva, Gorno-Altayskaya, Kuznetsk Alatau), and the United States (Massachusetts, New York State). It is named for the spines on the ventral side of the pygidium, which give it a serrated impression.

Fletcher & Theokritoff (2008) designated Shaw’s (1950, pl. 79, fig. 24) specimen of “Weymouthia nobilis (Ford, 1872)” as the holotype of a new species, Serrodiscus weymouthioides, and considered Runcinodiscus Rushton (in Bassett et al., 1976) [= ?Weymouthia nobilis (Ford, 1872)] to be a junior synonym of Serrodiscus. Weymouthia and Runcinodiscus had previously been viewed as closely allied with Serrodiscus (e.g. Rushton op. cit., 1976).

== Species list ==
- Serrodiscus serratus Richter & Richter (1941) - Type species [Eodiscus (Serrodiscus) serratus].
- Serrodiscus silesius Richter & Richter (1941, pl. 1, figs. 11-14; Geyer & Elicki 1995, figs. 3.1-3.9, 5.1, 5.3).
- Serrodiscus speciosus (Ford, 1872).
- Serrodiscus bellimarginatus (Shaler & Foerste, 1888).
- Serrodiscus weymouthioides Fletcher & Theokritoff 2008, = Weymouthia nobilis (Ford, 1872); Rushton (in Bassett et al. 1976, p. 630) reasoned that Weymouthia nobilis (Ford, 1872) is a nomen dubium.
- Serrodiscus ctenoa Rushton, 1966.
- Serrodiscus mackenziensis Fritz, 1973.
- Serrodiscus daedatus Öpik, 1975.
- Serrodiscus gravestocki Jell, (in Bengston et al., 1990)
- Serrodiscus areolosus Zhou in Zhou et al., 1982.
- Serrodiscus subclavatus Rasetti, 1966.
- Serrodiscus spinulosus Rasetti, 1966.
- Serrodiscus latus Rasetti, 1966.
- Serrodiscus griswaldi Rasetti, 1967.

== Distribution ==
- S. bellimarginatus (Shaler & Foerste, 1888) is known from the Lower Cambrian of Canada (Atdabanian, Callavia broeggeri zone, Branchian Series, St. Mary’s Member, Brigus Formation, Long Cove, Trinity Bay, and Redland Point, St. Mary’s Bay, Newfoundland.
- S. speciosus (Ford, 1873) has been found in the Lower Cambrian of Poland (Atdabanian, Ocieseki Sandstone and Kamieniec Shale, Holy Cross Mountains). The species also occurs in the Brown’s Pond Formation (“Schodack Formation”), Troy, New York. Type locality for S. speciosus is Rasetti's (1966) locality cs-4 in limestone beds which form several outcrops on a hillside (Griswold Farm) about 1 mile southeast of North Chatham, Columbia County, New York State, USA; the faunule is referred to as the Acimetopus bilobatus faunule from one of the most common and characteristic trilobites. It also occurs in a continuously exposed section of about 250 feet of strata along the New York Central Railroad tracks on the east shore of the Hudson River at Judson Point. About 130 feet of exposed black shale overlie 120 feet of alternating sandstones, shales, sandy or relatively pure limestones, and limestone conglomerates. However, fossil evidence shows that the strata are overturned, with the black shale underlying the sandstone shale-limestone sequence. Fossils occur about 30 - 40 and 75 feet below the top of the shale, and indicate the Lower Cambrian Elliptocephala asaphoides fauna.
- Serrodiscus ctenoa Rushton, 1966, was recovered from the Purley Shale Formation (c. 450' above base), Protolenus Biozone, of Camp Hill, St. Paul's Church, Stockingford, Nuneaton, Warwickshire, England [Closest ICS interval: Cambrian Series 3 – Terreneuvian Epoch]: Holotype is A 57067, held in the collections of the Sedgwick Museum of Earth Sciences, University of Cambridge, England.
- Serrodiscus silesius Richter & Richter, 1941, Serrodiscus beds of Lusatiops Member, Niederludwigsdorf, near Görlitz, Saxonia, eastern Germany: quarry 1 (material of Schwarzbach 1934 and Richter, & Richter, 1941) and quarry 3.
- Serrodiscus areolosus Zhou in Zhou et al., 1982, was described rom the Shuangyingshan Formation, Lower Cambrian (Cambrian Series 2) of Dahuoluo, Subei County, northwestern Gansu, China.
- Serrodiscus gravestocki Jell, (in Bengston et al., 1990) was discovered in the Early Cambrian Hawker Group, Oraparinna Shale, Bunyeroo Gorge, Flinders Ranges, South Australia.
- Serrodiscus subclavatus Rasetti, 1966a, collected from Rasetti's locality cs-4, Griswold Farm, North Chatham, New York State [see S. speciosus (q. v.) for detail].
- Serrodiscus spinulosus Rasetti, 1966a, collected from Rasetti's locality cs-4, Griswold Farm.
- Serrodiscus latus Rasetti, 1966a, collected from Rasetti's locality cs-4, Griswold Farm.
- Serrodiscus griswaldi Rasetti, 1967, collected from Rasetti's locality cs-4, Griswold Farm.

== Description ==
Like all Weymouthiidae, Serrodiscus lacks eyes and facial sutures. The cephalon is semi-elliptical; glabella conical or parallel sided and usually with weak or effaced furrows. Front of glabella does not extend to the anterior furrow; preglabellar field short (sag.) and sometimes separating the genae by a shallow depression. Occipital ring may or may not carry a backward-directed spine. Cephalic border convex, with up to eight pairs of tubercles laterally. Thorax has three segments. The pygidium has a wide, subconical axis with more than eight rings. The pleural fields are extremely weakly furrowed (on internal mould only). Pygidial border becomes narrower towards posterior and usually carries about 8 ventral spines either side.

== Behaviour ==
Serrodiscus could protect its soft underside by enrollment and it has been demonstrated that the ventral spines on the pygidial doublure interlock the nodes on the cephalic border, probably improving defense.
