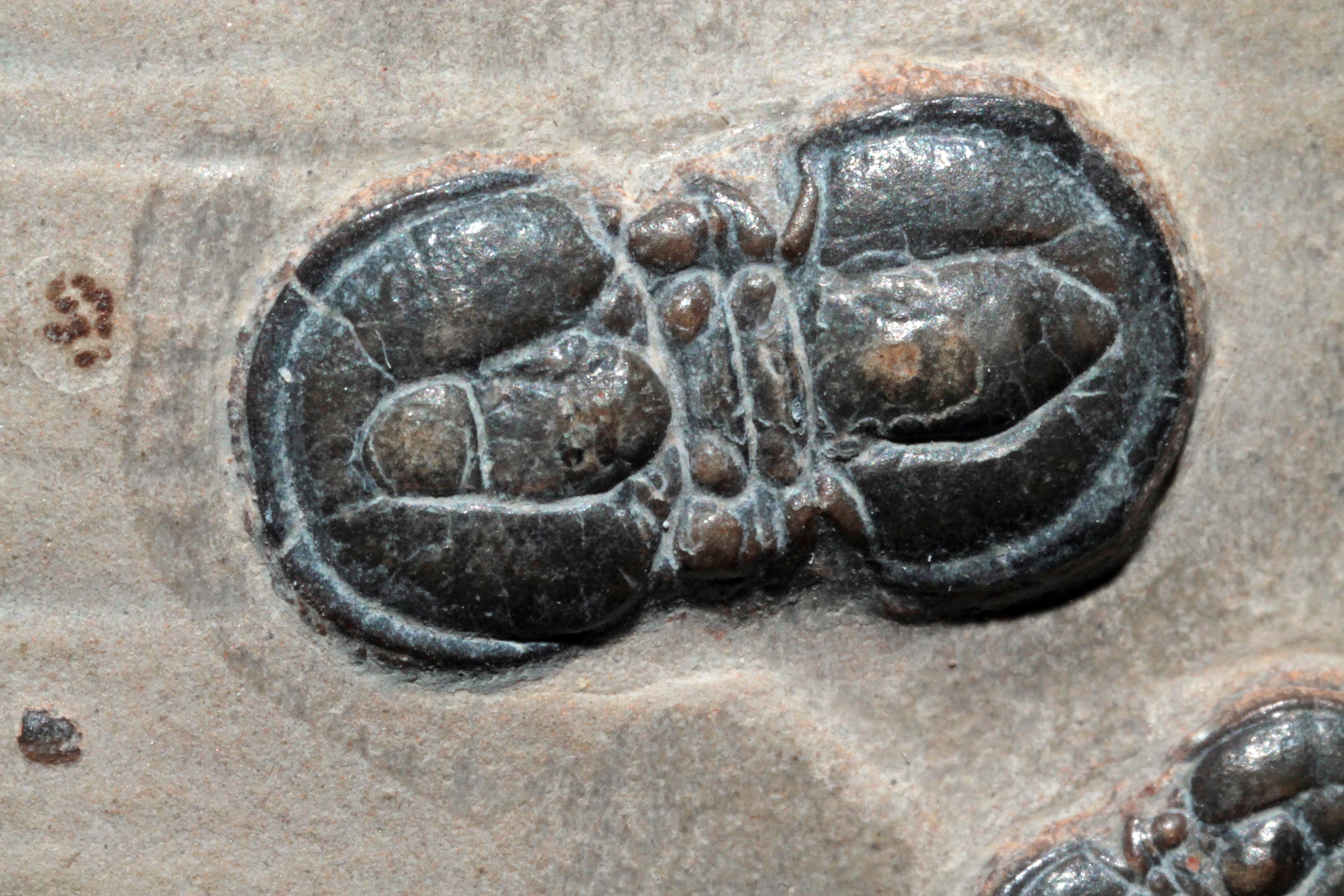
- Itagnostus interstrictus

Scientific classification
- Kingdom: Animalia
- Phylum: Arthropoda
- Clade: †Artiopoda
- Subphylum: †Trilobitomorpha
- Class: †Trilobita (?)
- Order: †Agnostida; Salter, 1864

Families
- Suborder Agnostina: Superfamily Agnostoidea; Agnostidae; Ammagnostidae; Clavagnostidae; Diplagnostidae; Doryagnostidae; Glyptagnostidae; Metagnostidae; Peronopsidae; Ptychagnostidae; Spinagnostidae; Superfamily Condylopygoidea; Condylopygidae; Suborder Eodiscina: Superfamily Eodiscoidea; Calodiscidae; Eodiscidae; Hebediscidae; Tsunyidiscidae; Weymouthiidae; Yukoniidae

Synonyms
- Isopygia Gürich, 1907; Miomera Jækel, 1909

= Agnostida =

Agnostida Temporal range: Cambrian Stage 3 –Late Ordovician

Extinct order of arthropods

Agnostida are an order of extinct arthropods which have classically been seen as a group of highly modified trilobites, though some recent research has doubted this placement. Regardless, they appear to be close relatives as part of the Artiopoda. They are present in the Lower Cambrian fossil record along with trilobites from the Redlichiida, Corynexochida, and Ptychopariida orders, and were highly diverse throughout the Cambrian. Agnostidan diversity severely declined during the Cambrian-Ordovician transition, and the last agnostidans went extinct in the Late Ordovician.

== Systematics ==
The Agnostida are divided into two suborders — Agnostina and Eodiscina — which are then subdivided into a number of families. As a group, agnostids are isopygous, meaning their pygidium is similar in size and shape to their cephalon. Most agnostid species were eyeless.

The systematic position of the order Agnostida within the class Trilobita remains uncertain, and there has been continuing debate whether they are trilobites or a stem group. The challenge to the status has focused on Agnostina partly due to the juveniles of one genus have been found with legs differing dramatically from those of adult trilobites, suggesting they are not members of the lamellipedian clade, of which trilobites are a part. Instead, the limbs of agnostids closely resemble those of stem group crustaceans, although they lack the proximal endite, which defines that group. The study suggested that they were likely the sister taxon to the crustacean stem lineage, and, as such, part of the clade, Crustaceomorpha. Other researchers have suggested, based on a cladistic analyses of dorsal exoskeletal features, that Eodiscina and Agnostida are closely united, and the Eodiscina descended from the trilobite order Ptychopariida. A 2019 study of adult specimens with preserved soft tissue from the Burgess Shale found that agnostidans shared morphological similarities to trilobites and other related artiopodans like nektaspids, and their placement as stem-crustaceans was unsupported. The study recovered agnostidans as the sister group to other trilobites within the Artiopoda.

== Ecology ==
Scientists have long debated whether the agnostids lived a pelagic or a benthic lifestyle. Their lack of eyes, a morphology not well-suited for swimming, and their fossils found in association with other benthic trilobites suggest a benthic (bottom-dwelling) mode of life. They are likely to have lived on areas of the ocean floor which received little or no light and fed on detritus which descended from upper layers of the sea to the bottom. Their wide geographic dispersion in the fossil record is uncharacteristic of benthic animals, suggesting a pelagic existence. The thoracic segment appears to form a hinge between the head and pygidium allowing for a bivalved ostracodan-type lifestyle. The orientation of the thoracic appendages appears ill-suited for benthic living. Recent work suggests that some agnostids were benthic predators, engaging in cannibalism and possibly pack-hunting behavior.

They are sometimes preserved within the voids of other organisms, for instance within empty hyolith conchs, within sponges, worm tubes and under the carapaces of bivalved arthropods, presumably in order to hide from predators or strong storm currents; or maybe whilst scavenging for food. In the case of the tapering worm tubes Selkirkia, trilobites are always found with their heads directed towards the opening of the tube, suggesting that they reversed in; the absence of any moulted carapaces suggests that moulting was not their primary reason for seeking shelter.
