= List of Hister species =

This is a list of 212 species in the genus Hister.

== Hister species ==
- Hister abbreviatus Fabricius, 1775
- Hister abhorrens (Schmidt, 1889)
- Hister aequatorius Marseul, 1854
- Hister akatanga Caterino, 1999
- Hister alegre Caterino, 1999
- Hister alienigena Bickhardt, 1912
- Hister alluaudi Desbordes, 1914
- Hister alticola Desbordes, 1925
- Hister ambulator Thayer in Johnson et al., 1991
- Hister amphystrius Marseul in Marseul and Oliveira, 1879
- Hister apicelaevis Desbordes, 1919
- Hister apis Marseul, 1870
- Hister araucanus Caterino and Arriagada, 2003
- Hister arboricavus Mazur et al., 2013
- Hister aschanti Schmidt, 1889
- Hister atholiformis Mazur, 2013
- Hister atomos P. Rossi, 1792
- Hister barkeri Desbordes, 1912
- Hister belti Lewis, 1910
- Hister bipunctatus Paykull, 1811
- Hister bisquinquestriatus Germar, 1813
- Hister bissexstriatus Fabricius, 1801
- Hister bitumineus Mazur, 2011
- Hister bolivianus Marseul, 1854
- Hister borneensis Desbordes, 1919
- Hister bremeri Mazur, 1979
- Hister bruchi Lewis, 1907
- Hister bullatus Lewis, 1888
- Hister calidus Erichson in Klug, 1842
- Hister californicus Marseul, 1854
- Hister canariensis Wollaston, 1864
- Hister capicola Marseul, 1854
- Hister capsirensis Auzat, 1922
- Hister carinifrons Schaeffer, 1912
- Hister catarinae Caterino, 1999
- Hister caucasicus Krása, 1944
- Hister cavifrons Marseul, 1854
- Hister cavilabris Bickhardt, 1919
- Hister ciliatus Lewis, 1888
- Hister circularis Lewis, 1889
- Hister circulus Schmidt, 1889
- Hister civilis J. E. LeConte, 1845
- Hister coenosus Erichson, 1834
- Hister comes Lewis, 1888
- Hister concolor Lewis, 1884
- Hister conductus Marseul, 1862
- Hister congener Schmidt, 1885
- Hister congonis Lewis, 1900
- Hister contemptus Marseul, 1854
- Hister cooperi G. Müller, 1944
- Hister coprophilus Reiche, 1850
- Hister coreanus Ôhara in Ôhara and Paik, 1998
- Hister coronatus Marseul, 1861
- Hister cribrurus Marseul, 1854
- Hister criticus Marseul, 1861
- Hister cruentus Erichson, 1834
- Hister cuna Caterino, 1999
- Hister curtatus J. E. LeConte, 1844
- Hister curvatus Erichson, 1834
- Hister defectus J. E. LeConte, 1860
- Hister denysi Marseul, 1870
- Hister depurator Say, 1825
- Hister diadema Marseul, 1854
- Hister dispar J. E. LeConte, 1844
- Hister distans Fischer de Waldheim, 1823
- Hister distinguendus Schmidt, 1895
- Hister doyeni Caterino, 1999
- Hister encaustus Marseul, 1854
- Hister erbelingi Mazur, 2008
- Hister falsus Solskiy, 1876
- Hister fossor Erichson, 1834
- Hister foveipygus Wenzel and Dybas, 1941
- Hister funestus Erichson, 1834
- Hister fungicola Schaeffer, 1912
- Hister furciger Marseul, 1869
- Hister furcipes Marseul, 1854
- Hister furtivus J. E. LeConte, 1860
- Hister gagatinus Reiche, 1850
- Hister gehini Marseul, 1854
- Hister grandicollis Illiger, 1807
- Hister gringo Caterino, 1999
- Hister guanacaste Caterino, 2004
- Hister guatemalica Caterino, 1999
- Hister guinensis Paykull, 1811
- Hister hanka Kapler, 1994
- Hister haroldi Marseul, 1864
- Hister helluo Truqui, 1852
- Hister helluonides Marseul, 1854
- Hister hipponensis Marseul, 1854
- Hister hormiguera Caterino, 1999
- Hister humilis Fall, 1910
- Hister humpatanus Marseul, 1886
- Hister illigeri Duftschmid, 1805
- Hister impunctatus Osawa, 1952
- Hister incertus Marseul, 1854
- Hister incisifrons Marseul, 1862
- Hister indistinctus Say, 1825
- Hister inexspectatus Desbordes, 1923
- Hister inflexus Lewis, 1914
- Hister janzeni Caterino, 1999
- Hister japonicus Marseul, 1854
- Hister javanicus Paykull, 1811
- Hister judaicus Mazur, 2008
- Hister kalaharii Thérond, 1965
- Hister katangensis Burgeon, 1939
- Hister kovariki Caterino, 1999
- Hister laevifrons Desbordes, 1914
- Hister laevimargo Lewis, 1900
- Hister laevipes Germar, 1824
- Hister lagoi Caterino, 1999
- Hister lamaecola Marseul, 1857
- Hister latimargo Schmidt, 1893
- Hister latistrius Lewis, 1891
- Hister latobius Marseul, 1854
- Hister lentulus Erichson, 1834
- Hister leopoldi Desbordes, 1929
- Hister limbatus Truqui, 1852
- Hister lineisternus Lewis, 1908
- Hister lissurus Marseul, 1854
- Hister litus Marseul, 1861
- Hister loandae Marseul, 1854
- Hister lucanus Horn, 1873
- Hister lucia Leivas, Moura and Caterino, 2015
- Hister lugubris Truqui, 1852
- Hister luvungiensis Burgeon, 1939
- Hister malkini Caterino, 1999
- Hister maroccanus Schmidt, 1887
- Hister matador Caterino, 1999
- Hister mazuri Kapler, 1997
- Hister mediterraneus Lundgren in Johnson et al., 1991
- Hister megalonyx Reichardt, 1922
- Hister melanarius Erichson, 1834
- Hister militaris Horn, 1870
- Hister mirus Bickhardt, 1919
- Hister moerens Erichson, 1834
- Hister mongol Sokolov, 2012
- Hister monitor Lewis, 1907
- Hister montanus Marseul, 1857
- Hister montenegrinus J. Müller, 1900
- Hister montivagus Lewis, 1888
- Hister nachtigalli Bickhardt, 1919
- Hister nattereri Schmidt, 1889
- Hister nepalensis Mazur, 1997
- Hister newtoni Caterino, 1999
- Hister niloticus Marseul, 1854
- Hister nodatus Lewis, 1888
- Hister nomas Erichson, 1834
- Hister obtusisternus Schmidt, 1889
- Hister opacus Schmidt, 1889
- Hister paganus Schmidt, 1889
- Hister paraincognitus Chakraborty and Biswas, 2003
- Hister parumstriatus Desbordes, 1924
- Hister paykullii Kirby, 1837
- Hister peregrinus Schmidt, 1889
- Hister pharaonis Schmidt, 1889
- Hister pioti Marseul, 1870
- Hister planepunctatus Desbordes, 1914
- Hister planiformis Lewis, 1897
- Hister platanus (Marseul, 1870)
- Hister pransus Lewis, 1892
- Hister pteromalus Marseul, 1861
- Hister pulicarius Thunberg, 1784
- Hister pullatus Erichson, 1834
- Hister punctifemur Mazur, 2010
- Hister punctifer Paykull, 1811
- Hister punctipygus Desbordes, 1914
- Hister pushtunus Kryzhanovskij, 1980
- Hister pustulosus Géné, 1839
- Hister putridus Erichson, 1834
- Hister pygolaevis Desbordes, 1917
- Hister quadrimaculatus Linnaeus, 1758
- Hister quadrinotatus Scriba, 1790
- Hister rectisternus Marseul, 1854
- Hister recurvus Marseul, 1854
- Hister ritsemae Marseul, 1882
- Hister saegeri Thérond, 1959
- Hister salebrosus (Schleicher, 1930)
- Hister sallei Marseul, 1854
- Hister salvador Caterino, 1999
- Hister sarcinatus Lewis, 1898
- Hister sedakovii Marseul, 1861
- Hister sedulus Lewis, 1898
- Hister semenovi Reichardt, 1924
- Hister semigranosus Marseul, 1854
- Hister semiplanus Marseul, 1854
- Hister sepulchralis Erichson, 1834
- Hister servus Erichson, 1834
- Hister shanghaicus Marseul, 1861
- Hister sibiricus Marseul, 1854
- Hister sikorae Lewis, 1891
- Hister simplicisternus Lewis, 1879
- Hister sindarae Yélamos, 1994
- Hister smetanai Mazur, 2011
- Hister spurius Marseul, 1861
- Hister sturnus Marseul, 1861
- Hister subquadratus (Marseul, 1853)
- Hister teter Truqui, 1852
- Hister thibetanus Marseul, 1857
- Hister thoracicus Paykull, 1811
- Hister tricuspis Lewis, 1903
- Hister trigonifrons Marseul, 1861
- Hister tristriatus Marseul, 1854
- Hister tropicola Schmidt, 1892
- Hister tropicus Paykull, 1811
- Hister turanus Solskiy, 1876
- Hister unicolor Linnaeus, 1758
- Hister viduus Fahraeus in Boheman, 1851
- Hister vilis Fahraeus in Boheman, 1851
- Hister wenzeli Caterino, 1999
- Hister zairensis Mazur, 1974
- Hister ziczac Mazur, 1985
- Hister zulu Marseul, 1881
