= Lucanus =

Lucanus may refer to:

== People ==
- Lucan (Marcus Annaeus Lucanus, 39 AD – 65 AD), Roman poet
- Friedrich von Lucanus (1869–1947), German ornithologist
- Gnaeus Domitius Lucanus (fl. first century AD), Roman senator and military commander
- Jan Lucanus (fl. from 2007), American comic book writer, filmmaker and entrepreneur
- Ocellus Lucanus (fl. 6th century BC), supposed Pythagorean philosopher
- Lucan, one of the Knights of the Round Table

== Other uses ==
- Lucanus (beetle), genus of stag beetles

== See also ==
- Lucan (disambiguation)
- Lucanas (disambiguation)
- Lucani (disambiguation)
- Lucca, a city in Tuscany, Italy
- Lucania, a historical region of Southern Italy
- Lucanians (Latin: Lucani), an Italic tribe living in Lucania
- Conotrachelus lucanus, a species of true weevil
- Hister lucanus, a species of clown beetle
- Styloxus lucanus, a species of Cerambycidae beetle
