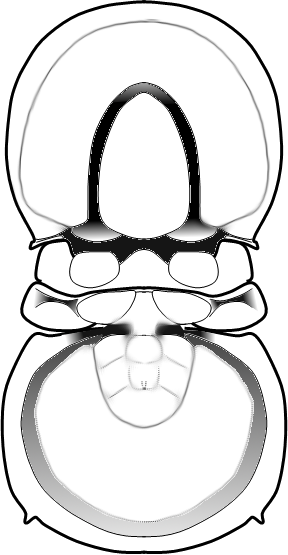
- A drawing of Trinodus tardus

Scientific classification
- Domain: Eukaryota
- Kingdom: Animalia
- Phylum: Arthropoda
- Clade: †Artiopoda
- Class: †Trilobita (?)
- Order: †Agnostida
- Family: †Metagnostidae
- Genus: †Trinodus; M'Coy, 1846

Type species
- †Trinodus agnostiformes M'Coy, 1846

Species
- †Trinodus agnostiformes M'Coy, 1846 synonyms A. agnostiformis, A. trinodus; †Trinodus tardus (Barrande,1846) synonyms Battus tardus, Agnostus glabratus, A. tardus Arthrorhachis tarda, alternative spelling A. tardus; †Trinodus elspethi (Raymond, 1925) synonym Arthrorhachis elspethi; †Trinodus danicus Poulsen, 1965 synonym Arthrorhachis danica; †Trinodus girvanensis (Reed, 1903) synonyms Agnostus girvanensis, Arthrorhachis girvanensis, Girvanagnostus girvanensis; †Trinodus hupehensis Lu, 1975 synonym Arthrorhachis hupehensis; †Trinodus knockerkensis Romano & Owen, 1993 synonym Arthrorhachis knockerkensis; †Trinodus latilimbata (Ju in Qiu et al., 1983)synonym Arthrorhachis latilimbata; †Trinodus pragensis (Přibyl & Vaněk, 1968) synonym Arthrorhachis pragensis

Synonyms
- †Arthrorhachis; †Girvanagnostus; †Metagnostus

= Trinodus =

Trinodus Temporal range: Ordovician

Extinct genus of trilobites

Trinodus is a very small to small (about 1 centimetre or 0.39 inches) blind trilobite, a well known group of extinct marine arthropods, which lived during the Ordovician (Tremadocian to early Hirnantian), in what are now the Yukon Territories, Virginia, Italy, Czech Republic, Poland, Denmark, Sweden, Svalbard, Ireland, Scotland, Wales, Iran, Kazakhstan and China. It is one of the last of the Agnostida order to survive.

== Etymology ==
Trinodus is derived from the Latin tri (three) and nodus (node).
Arthrorhachis is derived from the Greek ἄρθρον (árthron, "joint") and ῥάχις (rháchis, meaning axis, spine, ridge or backbone).

== Taxonomy ==
Trinodus, Arthrorhachis and Geragnostus are closely related and it may be appropriate to assign their species to just one genus. All species in these three genera have virtually identical cephalons, but of T. agnostiformes, the type species of Trinodus only one poorly preserved cephalon was known. However, relatively recent, pygidia assignable to T. agnostiformes were found. Although this material is distorted or incompletely preserved, it is very similar to the pygidium of Arthrorhachis tarda. Species with a rear rhachis lobe longer than the postaxial region are henceforth combined in Geragnostus, all others are assigned to Trinodus.

=== Species previously assigned to Trinodus ===
- T. glabratus var. kirgizica = Geragnostus kirgizica
- T. kirgizica = Geragnostus kirgizica
- T. longicollis = Geragnostus longicollis

== Distribution ==
- T. agnostiformes was identified in the Upper Ordovician of Ireland (Caradoc, Greenville slates, Campile Formation).
- Trinodus danicus occurs in Ordovician of Svalbard (Ibexian 488.3 - 471.8 Mya, Psephosthenaspis nasuta trilobite zone, Olenidsletta Member, Valhallfonna Formation, Ny Friesland, 79.8° N, 17.8° E).
- Trinodus elspethi is present in the Upper Ordovician of the USA (Kathian?, Athens Shale, Ina railroad cutting, South of Otes, North of Bulls Gap, Hawkins, Tennessee).
- T. hupehensis has been found in the Middle Ordovician of China (Dawan Formation, upper Arenig, Fenxiang, Yichang County, West Hubei).
- Trinodus knockerkensis has been collected from the Ordovician of Ireland (Lower Caradoc, Brickwork's Quarry Shales Member, Knockerk Formation, 53.8° N, 6.6° W).
- Trinodus pragensis is present in the Upper Ordovician of the Czech Republic (Lower Katian, abandoned brickyard “Na bílém koni”, Bohdalec Formation, Karlíkore Horizon, Praha-Hloubětín). A. pragensis precedes A. tardus in Czech Republic.
- Trinodus tardus is present in the Upper Ordovician of Denmark (Læså - stream section at Vasegård -, Øleå - stream section at Billegrav Gård -, and Risebæk, all Bornholm), of Sweden (In Skåne: Koången in the classical Fågelsång area east of Lund; Koången core; Lindegård core; Rostånga; Tommarp; Jerrestad, stream section in the Jerrestadsån rivulet; Tosterup. In Östergötland: Råssnäs and Rödbergsudde, both near Motala. In Västergötland: Lower Jonstorp Formation "Green Tretaspis Shale" at Bestorp – Mosseberg. Upper Jonstorp Formation "Red Tretaspis Shale" and Ulunda Mudstone of the upper Jerrestadian Stage at Stommen (Kungslena); Varvsberget, Skogastorp, Plantaberget (Högstenaberget); Skultorp, Billingen; Rustsäter, Kinnekulle; Kullatorp core, Kinnekulle. In Dalarna: Vikarbyn and Gulleråsen-Sanden) of Norway (Oslo Region, Hovedøya, Spannslokket Member of the Skogerholmen Formation; Åslund, Hadeland Gagnum Shale Member of the Lunner Formation) of the Czech Republic (upper Katian, Tretaspis seticornis community, Kraluv Dvur Formation), of Italy (Foliomena community, Domusnovas Formation, Punta S'Argiola, Sardinia, 40.0° N, 8.0° E), of Iran (late Caradoc, early Asgill, Tatavrud, 35 km southwest of Bandar-e-Anzali), and of Kazakhstan.
- Trinodus sp. (presumably T. tardus) has been collected from the Ordovician of Czech Republic (Králův Dvůr Formation, Prague Basin).
- Trinodus sps. are found in the Ordovician of Canada (Llanvirn, Road River Formation, Peraspis fauna, Yukon Territory, 62.8° N, 136.6° W, and Cnemidopyge fauna, 65.0° N, 111.5° W), of China (Baota (Pagoda) Formation, NingLang, NingLang County, Yunnan), of Poland (Hirnantian, Holycross Mountains, 51.0° N, 21.0° E), of Wales (North Wales Rawtheyan Assemblage 4C, Crugan Mudstone and Duyfor Mudstone fauna, 53.0° N, 4.0° W; Rhwlas Limestone Formation and Opsimasaphus-Nankinolithus trilobite association, 53.0° N, 3.0° W; Pontyfeni Formation, B. rushtoni and Stapeleyella abyfrons biozone, Whitland, 52.0° N, 5.0° W) and Scotland (Costonian, Superstes Mudstone, Stinchar River tributary, Colmonell, Gircan District, Strathclyde, 57.0° N, 4.0° W).

== Development ==
Trinodus elspethi, which - as an agnostoid - only has two thorax segments, has at least nine larval stages (or instars), three meraspid and six holaspid, in its life. So it molted at least eight times.
