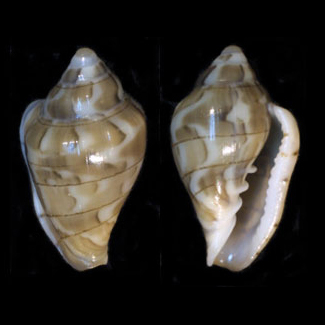
- Two views of a shell of Glabella lucani

Scientific classification
- Kingdom: Animalia
- Phylum: Mollusca
- Class: Gastropoda
- Subclass: Caenogastropoda
- Order: Neogastropoda
- Superfamily: Volutoidea
- Family: Marginellidae
- Subfamily: Marginellinae
- Genus: Glabella; Swainson, 1840

Synonyms:
- Faba P. Fischer, 1883; Marginella (Glabella) Swainson, 1840; Phoenospira Petit, 1851

= Glabella (gastropod) =

Genus of gastropods

Glabella is a genus of small tropical and warm-water sea snails, marine gastropod molluscs in the family Marginellidae, the margin snails.

== Taxonomy ==
It is debatable whether it is justified to distinguish this genus from Marginella s. str. without a comprehensive phylogenetic hypothesis of the family. However the two genera cannot be objective synonyms because Marginella glabella (Linnaeus, 1758) is not one of the species originally included in Glabella.

== Species ==
According to the World Register of Marine Species (WoRMS), the following species with valid names are included within the genus Glabella :

- Glabella adansoni Kiener, 1834
- Glabella ansonae Clover, 1976
- Glabella bellii G.B. Sowerby II, 1846
- Glabella bifasciata (Lamarck, 1822)
- Glabella davisiana Marrat, 1877
- Glabella denticulata Link, 1807
- Glabella faba (Linnaeus, 1758)
- Glabella fumigata (Gofas & Fernandes, 1994)
- Glabella harpaeformis G.B. Sowerby II, 1846
- Glabella macua Boyer, Rosado & Gori, 2018
- Glabella mirabilis H. Adams, 1869
- Glabella mozambicana Boyer, 2014
- Glabella nodata (Hinds, 1844)
- Glabella obtusa G.B. Sowerby II, 1846
- Glabella omanensis Boyer, 2014
- Glabella pseudofaba G.B. Sowerby II, 1846
- Glabella reeveana Petit, 1851
- Glabella rosadoi Kilburn, 1994
- Glabella rotunda Boyer, 2014
- Glabella tyermani (Marrat, 1876)
- Glabella xicoi (Boyer, Ryall & Wakefield, 1999)
- Glabella youngi Kilburn, 1977

Species brought into synonymy

- Glabella arenaria Mörch, 1852: synonym of Glabella denticulata (Link, 1807)
- Glabella ferreirai Alves, 1996 synonym of Glabella mozambicana Boyer, 2014
- Glabella henrikasi (Bozzetti, 1995): synonym of Marginella henrikasi Bozzetti, 1995
- Glabella lucani (Jousseaume, 1884): synonym of Marginella lucani Jousseaume, 1884
