= King's Court =

King's Court or Kingscourt may refer to:

- King's Court, building that is part of King's Square, York, England
- King's Court, another name for King Booker's Court, a professional wrestling stable
- King's Court, another name for Four corners (game), a children's game
- A variant of dodgeball; see List of dodgeball variations § Doctor dodgeball
- Kingscourt, a town in County Cavan, Ireland
  - Kingscourt railway station, former station in the town
  - Kingscourt Stars GAA, Gaelic sports club in the town
- Kingscourt Gypsum, a geologic formation in Ireland
- Kingscourt Sandstone, a geologic formation in Ireland
- King's Court (film), a Canadian short documentary film
