= Ferriter =

Ferriter is a surname of Irish origin. People with that name include:

- Diarmaid Ferriter (born 1972), Irish historian
- Jack Ferriter (active 1990s), Irish Gaelic footballer
- John Ferriter (1960–2019), American television producer and talent manager and scout
- Michael Ferriter (active from 1979), United States Army Lieutenant General
- Roger Ferriter (active from 1969), American graphic designer
- Sean Ferriter (active c. 1960s), Gaelic footballer

== See also ==
- Ferrater, a surname
- Ferriter's Cove, a small bay located at the westernmost point of Dingle Peninsula, in County Kerry, Ireland
- Ferriters Cove Formation, a geologic formation in Ireland
- Piaras Feiritéar (c. 1600 – 1653), Irish poet
