= Lucani (disambiguation) =

Lucani may refer to:

- Lučani, a town and municipality in the Moravica district of Serbia
  - Lučani (selo), a village
- Lucanians (Latin: Lucani), an ancient people of Italy

== See also ==
- Lucan (disambiguation)
- Lucanus (disambiguation)
- Donji Lučani, a village in the municipality of Kakanj, Bosnia and Herzegovina
  - Gornji Lučani
- Marginella lucani, a species of sea snail
- Hyperolius lucani, a species of frog
