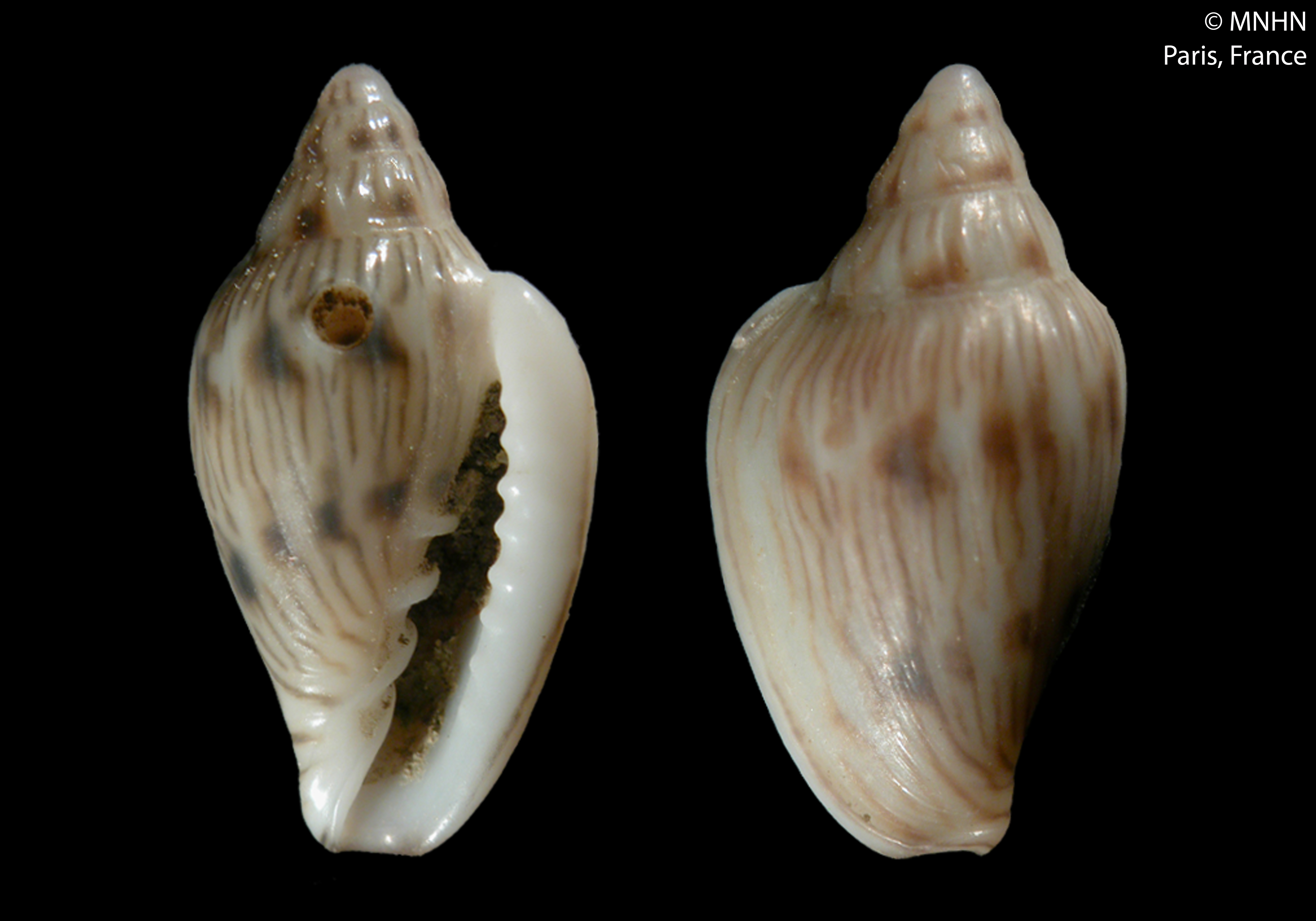
- Shell of Marginella aequinoctialis (holotype at MNHN, Paris)

Scientific classification
- Kingdom: Animalia
- Phylum: Mollusca
- Class: Gastropoda
- Subclass: Caenogastropoda
- Order: Neogastropoda
- Family: Marginellidae
- Genus: Marginella
- Species: M. aequinoctialis

Binomial name
- Marginella aequinoctialis Boyer & Simbille, 2004

= Marginella aequinoctialis =

Species of gastropod

Marginella aequinoctialis is a species of sea snail, a marine gastropod mollusk in the family Marginellidae, the margin snails.

This species has not, so far (2017) been formally reassigned to Glabella Swainson, 1840 but belongs there as being a sibling species of Glabella bellii (G.B. Sowerby II, 1846).

== Description ==
The length of the shell attains 10.9 mm.

== Distribution ==
This species occurs in the Atlantic Ocean off Gabon at a depth of 25 m.
