= Hister indistinctus =

Scientific classification
- Kingdom: Animalia
- Phylum: Arthropoda
- Class: Insecta
- Order: Coleoptera
- Suborder: Polyphaga
- Infraorder: Staphyliniformia
- Family: Histeridae
- Genus: Hister
- Species: H. indistinctus

Binomial name
- Hister indistinctus Say, 1825

Species of beetle

Hister indistinctus is a species of clown beetle in the family Histeridae. It is found in North America.
