= Kilmore Sandstone Group =

Geologic group in Ireland

- Stratigraphic range: Devonian
- Type: Group

Lithology
- Primary: Sandstone

Location
- Country: Ireland

The Kilmore Sandstone Group is a geologic group in Ireland.

It preserves fossils dating back to the Devonian period.

== See also ==
- List of fossiliferous stratigraphic units in Ireland
