= Kingscourt Sandstone =

Geologic formation in Ireland

- Stratigraphic range: Triassic
- Type: Formation

Lithology
- Primary: Sandstone

Location
- Coordinates: 53.92°N 6.79°W
- Country: Ireland

The Kingscourt Sandstone is a geologic formation in Ireland. It preserves fossils dating back to the Triassic period.

The formation is immediately to the west of the Kingscourt Gypsum formation, stretching through counties Cavan and Monaghan.

== See also ==
- List of fossiliferous stratigraphic units in Ireland
