= Styloxus bicolor =

Scientific classification
- Kingdom: Animalia
- Phylum: Arthropoda
- Class: Insecta
- Order: Coleoptera
- Suborder: Polyphaga
- Infraorder: Cucujiformia
- Family: Cerambycidae
- Genus: Styloxus
- Species: S. bicolor

Binomial name
- Styloxus bicolor (Champlain & Knull, 1922)

Species of beetle

Styloxus bicolor is a species of beetle in the family Cerambycidae. It was described by Champlain and Knull in 1922.
