= Lucanas =

Lucanas may refer to:

- Lucanas Province, the largest province in the Ayacucho Region, in Peru
- Lucanas District, one of the twenty-one districts of Lucanas Province

== See also ==
- Lucanus (disambiguation)
