= Fingal Group =

- Stratigraphic range: Carboniferous
- Type: Group

Location
- Country: Ireland

The Fingal Group is a geologic group in Ireland. It preserves fossils dating back to the Carboniferous period.

== See also ==
- List of fossiliferous stratigraphic units in Ireland
