= Hister laevipes =

Scientific classification
- Kingdom: Animalia
- Phylum: Arthropoda
- Class: Insecta
- Order: Coleoptera
- Suborder: Polyphaga
- Infraorder: Staphyliniformia
- Family: Histeridae
- Genus: Hister
- Species: H. laevipes

Binomial name
- Hister laevipes Germar, 1824

Species of beetle

Hister laevipes is a species of clown beetle in the family Histeridae. It is found in North America.
