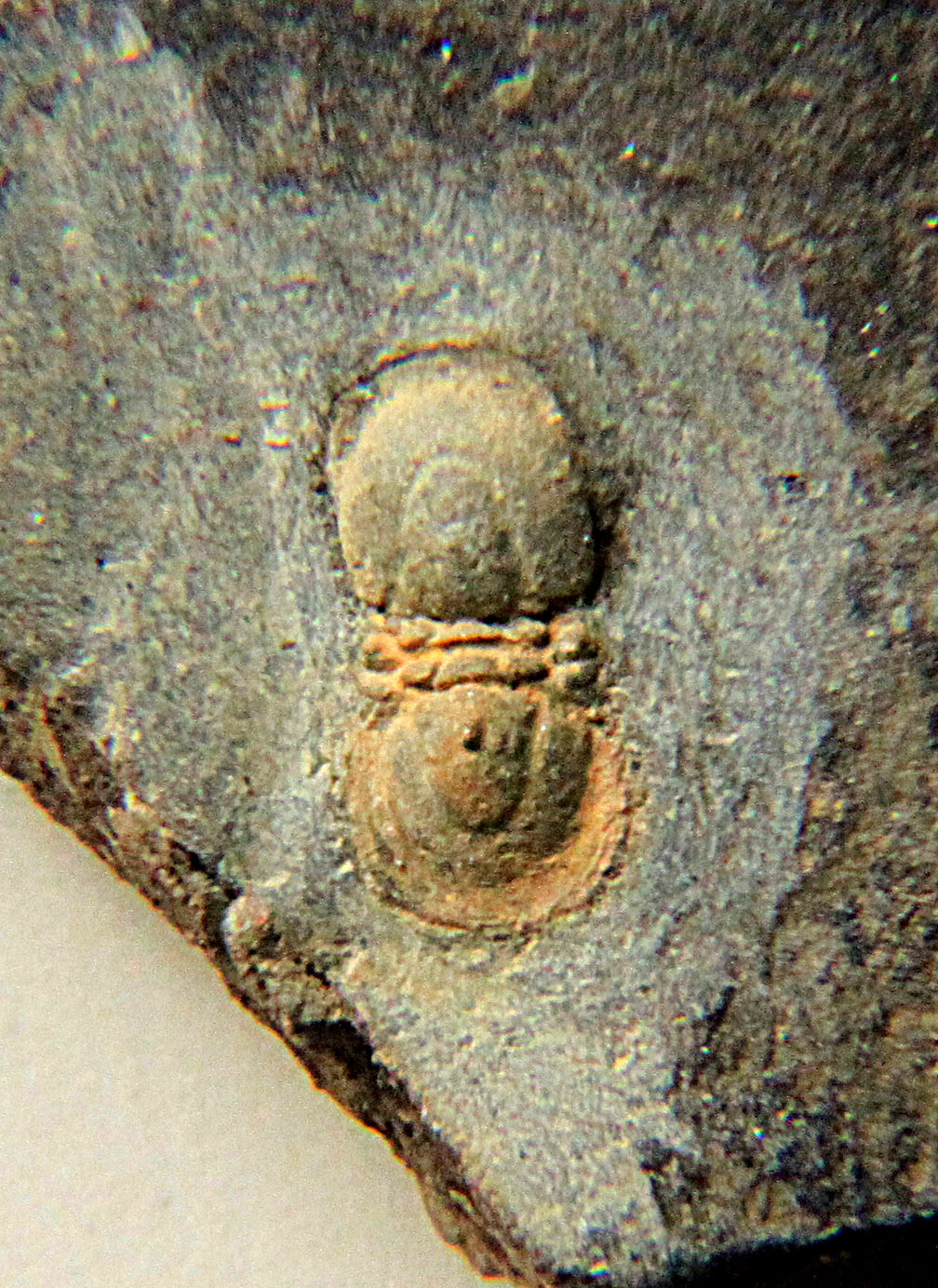
- Geragnostus mediterraneus, 6mm, St.Chinian Formation, France, Middle Ordovician

Scientific classification
- Domain: Eukaryota
- Kingdom: Animalia
- Phylum: Arthropoda
- Class: †Trilobita (?)
- Order: †Agnostida
- Family: †Metagnostidae
- Genus: †Geragnostus; Howell, 1935

Species
- G. sidenbladhi (Linnarsson, 1869) (type) synonym Agnostus sidenbladhi; G. balanolobus Turvey, 2005; G. clusus Whittington, 1963; G. consors (Holub, 1912) synonyms Agnostus consors, Neptunagnostella consors; G. crassus Tjernvik, 1956; G. fabius Billings, 1865; G. fenhsiangensis Lu, 1975; G. gilcidae Rábano, Pek & Vaněk, 1985; G. hispanicus Rábano, Pek & Vaněk, 1985; G. kirgizica (Weber, 1948) synonyms Trinodus glabratus var. kirgizica, T. kirgizica; G. longicollis Raymond, 1925; G. occitanus Howell, 1935; G. perconvexus (Kobayashi & Hamada, 1978) synonym Geratrinodus perconvexus; G. splendens (Holub, 1912); G. tullbergi (Novák, 1883) synonyms Agnostus tullbergi, Geragnostella tullbergi; G. waldorfstatleri Turvey, 2005

Synonyms
- Geragnostella, Geratrinodus, Neptunagnostella

= Geragnostus =

Geragnostus Temporal range: Ordovician (Tremadocian to Ashgill)

Extinct genus of trilobites

Geragnostus is a genus of very small agnostid trilobites whose fossils are found Ordovician-aged marine strata from Eurasia, North America and Argentina.

== Etymology ==
- balanolobus is derived from the Greek 'balanos', acorn, and 'lobos', lobe, in reference to the outline of the rear lobe of the rhachis.
- sidenbladhi has been named in honor of the Swedish philosopher and paleontologist Elis Sidenbladh.
- waldorfstatleri is named after the Muppets Statler and Waldorf for the likeness of the rhachis to their heads.

== Taxonomy ==
Geragnostus is very similar to Trinodus and may in future be included in that genus. In Trinodus the posterior lobe (M3) of the pygidial axis (or rhachis) is clearly shorter than the anterior and middle lobes (M1+M2) combined, while in Geragnostus it is equal or greater in length. Geragnostus is not closely related to Micragnostus, because its glabella is structurally different.

=== Species previously assigned to Geragnostus ===
- G. chronius = Oncagnostus (Strictagnostus) chronius
- G. hirundo = Segmentagnostus hirundo
- G. scoltonensis = Segmentagnostus scoltonensis

== Distribution ==
- G. clusus, was found in the Middle Ordovician of Canada (Llanvirn, Lower Head, Newfoundland)
- G. crassus, has been identified from the Lower Ordovician of Baltica (Tremadoc), and the Lower (Tremadoc of Yingou, Yumen County, Gansu) and Middle Ordovician of China (lower Llanvirn, Angzhanggou, Yumen County, Gansu)
- G. fabius, Canada (Newfoundland and Labrador)
- G. fenhsiangensis, is known from the Middle Ordovician of China (Dawan Formation, upper Arenig, Fenxiang, Yichang County, West Hubei)
- G. gilcidae and G. hispanicus, were found in the Middle Ordovician of Spain (lower Llanvirn, Southern Central-Iberian Zone, Mounts of Toledo, Villuercas and Almadén district)
- G. kirgizica, is present in the Middle Ordovician of Kazakhstan (Karakansky horizon), and the Upper Ordovician of Iran (late Caradoc, early Asgill, Tatavrud, 35 km southwest of Bandar-e-Anzali)
- G. longicollis, in Canada and China
- G. occitanus, is present in the Lower and Middle Ordovician of France (Arenig, Montagne Noire)
- G. sidenbladhi, occurs in the Lower Ordovician (upper Tremadoc, Ceratopyge-limestone, Apatokephalus serratus-biozone) of Sweden (Mossebo, Hunneberg, Västergötland; Fågelsång, Scania) and Norway (Trefoldighetskirken, central Oslo; Bjerkåsholmen, Slemmestad in the Oslo-Asker district; Fure at Tyrifjorden in the Modum district; and Samsal in the Ringsaker district)
- G. splendens, was excavated from the Lower and Middle Ordovician of Baltica and the Czech Republic (Arenig)
- G. waldorfstatleri, has been found in the Lower and Middle Ordovician of South China (Arenig-Llanvirn)

Unidentified species in the genus Geragnostus have among others been found in Colombia (Guaviare River, Meta).

== Description ==
Like all Agnostida, Geragnostus is diminutive, with the headshield (or cephalon) and tailshield (or pygidium) of approximately the same size (or isopygous) and outline. Like all Agnostina, Geragnostus has only two thorax segments, where known. The cephalon is subquadrate in outline, and almost as long as wide. The highest point is the node in the centre of the centrally raised section of the cephalon (or glabella). The glabella is about 2/3 times the length of the cephalon, and its sides are very gently tapered forward, with a broadly rounded front, and is well defined by shallow furrows and an abrupt change in exoskeletal slope. It is 2 times as long as wide. The elongated glabellar node is prominent. The rear of the glabella is straight. Just in front of the node, a depression curves forward- and outward. The basal lobes are wider than they are long and almost touch. The border is relatively narrow, gently convex, and defined by a wide, shallow border furrow, widest at the front. The genal angles are pointed without spines.

The pygidial axis (or rhachis) is 1/2–2/3 times as long as the pygidium, almost parallel-sided, very slightly constricted at the middle lobe (M2), broadly rounded, and 1 1/3–1 2/3 times as long as wide. It has three distinct pairs of lobes, and is defined by shallow furrows. The forward lobe of the rhachis (M1) is a bit shorter and wider than the middle lobe (M2) and separated from it by a furrow (F1) which is directed outward and slightly backward from the dorsal furrow, and then curved strongly forward adaxially. The rear lobe (M3) is 1 1/3–1 2/3 longer than both others together, and the furrow is directed outward and slightly forward from the dorsal furrow. The middle lobe has a prominent tubercle, which extends backwards above the anterior portion of rear lobe. It is the highest point of the pygidium. The border is moderately wide, gently convex, defined by a shallow furrow, and widest at the rear corners which carry a pair of strong, backwardly directed spines.
