= Grange Allen Formation =

Geologic formation in Ireland

- Stratigraphic range: Ordovician
- Type: Formation

Location
- Country: Ireland

The Grange Allen Formation is a geologic formation in Ireland. It preserves fossils dating back to the Ordovician period.

== See also ==
- List of fossiliferous stratigraphic units in Ireland
