= Glabella tyermani =

Scientific classification
- Kingdom: Animalia
- Phylum: Mollusca
- Class: Gastropoda
- Subclass: Caenogastropoda
- Order: Neogastropoda
- Family: Marginellidae
- Genus: Glabella
- Species: G. tyermani

Binomial name
- Glabella tyermani (Marrat, 1876)

Synonyms
- Glabella eveleighi Tomlin & Schackleford, 1913; Glabella keppeli (Sykes, 1905); Marginella eveleighi Tomlin & Shackleford, 1913; Marginella keppeli Sykes, 1905; Marginella tyermani Marrat, 1876

Species of gastropod

Glabella tyermani is a species of sea snail, a marine gastropod mollusk in the family Marginellidae, the margin snails.

== Description ==
The length of the shell varies between 4.5 mm and 16 mm.

== Distribution ==
This species is distributed in the Atlantic Ocean along Gabon and Liberia.

- Island of Banié
- Komo estuary
- Port Gentil, Gabon
