= Hister comes =

Scientific classification
- Kingdom: Animalia
- Phylum: Arthropoda
- Class: Insecta
- Order: Coleoptera
- Suborder: Polyphaga
- Infraorder: Staphyliniformia
- Family: Histeridae
- Genus: Hister
- Species: H. comes

Binomial name
- Hister comes Lewis, 1888

Synonyms
- Hister temporalis Fall, 1910

Species of beetle

Hister comes is a species of clown beetle in the family Histeridae. It is found in Central America and North America.
