= Harrylock Formation =

Geologic formation in Ireland

- Stratigraphic range: Devonian
- Type: Formation

Location
- Country: Ireland

The Harrylock Formation is a geologic formation in Ireland. It preserves fossils dating back to the Devonian period.

== Fossil content ==
Color key: Taxon / Reclassified taxon / Taxon falsely reported as present / Dubious taxon or junior synonym / Ichnotaxon / Ootaxon / Morphotaxon

Notes
Uncertain or tentative taxa are in small text
~~crossed out~~ taxa are discredited.

=== Plants ===
Plants of the Harrylock Formation
Genus	Species	Location	Stratigraphic position	Material	Notes	Images
Callixylon	C. seamrogia				A progymnosperm tree	

== See also ==
- List of fossiliferous stratigraphic units in Ireland
