= Lucan (disambiguation) =

Lucan is the common English name of the Roman poet Marcus Annaeus Lucanus.

Lucan may also refer to:

== People ==
- Arthur Lucan (1885–1954), English actor
- Jacques Lucan (1947–2023), French academic, architect, and historian
- Vladimír Lučan (born 1977), Czech orienteering competitor
- Lucan, one of the Knights of the Round Table in Arthurian legend
- Earl of Lucan, a title in the peerage of Ireland, including a list of people with the title
  - John Bingham, 7th Earl of Lucan, the infamous Lord Lucan who mysteriously disappeared in 1974

== Places ==
- Lucan, Dublin, Ireland, a suburb
- Lucan, Minnesota, United States, a small city
- Lucan, Lucan Biddulph, Ontario, Canada
  - Lucan Airport

== Other uses ==
- Lucan (American TV series), 1977–1978, based on the 1977 made-for-TV film of the same name
- Lucan (British TV series), 2013, about the missing Lord Lucan
- Lucan Formation, a geologic formation in Ireland

== See also ==
- Lucani (disambiguation)
