= Hollyford Formation =

Geologic formation in Ireland

- Stratigraphic range: Silurian
- Type: Formation
- Unit of: Silurian succession of the Cratloe Hills

Lithology
- Primary: mudstone, greywacke, siltstone

Location
- Region: County Clare
- Country: Ireland
- Extent: Cratloe Hills, western Ireland

The Hollyford Formation is a rock unit from the Silurian found in the Cratloe Hills, County Clare, Ireland. It is made mainly of mudstone, greywacke, and fine siltstone. These rocks were formed in a deep sea environment, where sediment was carried into the basin by underwater flows called turbidity currents, building up layers over time.

== See also ==
- List of fossiliferous stratigraphic units in Ireland
