= List of fossiliferous stratigraphic units in the Republic of Ireland =

Rock layers containing fossils

Group or Formation	Period	Notes
Ballyadams Formation	Carboniferous	
Ballysteen Limestone Formation	Carboniferous	
Boyne Group/Feltrim Formation	Carboniferous	
Boyne Group/Slane Castle Formation	Carboniferous	
Carboniferous Formation	Carboniferous	
Clashford House Formation	Ordovician	
Clogrenan Formation	Carboniferous	
Cloonnamna Formation	Silurian	
Courtown Formation	Ordovician	
Dartry Limestone Formation	Carboniferous	
Drom Point Formation	Silurian	
Duncannon Formation	Ordovician	
Duncannon Group/Campile Formation	Ordovician	
Duncannon Group/Portrane Limestone Formation	Ordovician	
Duncannon Group/Tramore Limestone Formation	Ordovician	
Feltrim Formation	Carboniferous	
Ferriters Cove Formation	Silurian	
Fingal Group/Lucan Formation	Carboniferous	
Fingal Group/Naul Formation	Carboniferous	
Fingal Group/Tober Colleen Formation	Carboniferous	
Glencar Limestone Formation	Carboniferous	
Grange Allen Formation	Ordovician	
Grangegeeth Group/Knockerk Formation	Ordovician	
Harrylock Formation	Devonian	
Hollyford Formation	Silurian	
Holmpatrick Formation	Carboniferous	
Hook head Formation	Carboniferous	
Kilbride Formation	Silurian	
Kilbride Limestone Formation	Carboniferous	
Kilcoan Sands Formation	Cretaceous	
Kildare Limestone Formation	Ordovician	
Kilmore Sandstone Group/Coomhola Formation	Carboniferous, Devonian	
Kiltorcan Formation	Devonian	
Kiltorcan beds Formation	Devonian	
Knockerk Formation	Ordovician	
Lane Formation	Carboniferous	
Limerick Limestone Formation	Carboniferous	
Lough Shee Mudrocks Formation	Ordovician	
Lower Bricklieve Limestone Formation	Carboniferous	
Mullaghfin Formation	Carboniferous	
Murrisk Group/Mweelrea Formation	Ordovician	
Navan Group/Liscartan Formation	Carboniferous	
Navan Group/Meath Formation	Carboniferous	
Navan Group/Moathill Formation	Carboniferous	
New Red Sandstone Group / Kingscourt Gypsum Formation	Permian	
New Red Sandstone Group / Kingscourt Sandstone Formation	Triassic	
Old Red Sandstone Group/Kiltorcan Formation	Devonian	
Porter's Gate Formation	Carboniferous	
Ribband Group/Booley Bay Formation	Cambrian	
Tourmakeady Formation	Ordovician	
Upper Bricklieve Limestone Formation	Carboniferous	
Upper Shawly Beds Formation	Carboniferous	
West Cork Sandstone Formation	Carboniferous	

== See also ==
- Lists of fossiliferous stratigraphic units in Europe
