= Glabella reeveana =

Scientific classification
- Kingdom: Animalia
- Phylum: Mollusca
- Class: Gastropoda
- Subclass: Caenogastropoda
- Order: Neogastropoda
- Family: Marginellidae
- Genus: Glabella
- Species: G. reeveana

Binomial name
- Glabella reeveana (Petit, 1851)

Synonyms
- Marginella reeveana Petit de la Saussaye, 1851 (basionym); Marginella splendens Reeve, 1842

Species of gastropod

Glabella reeveana is a species of sea snail, a marine gastropod mollusk in the family Marginellidae, the margin snails.
