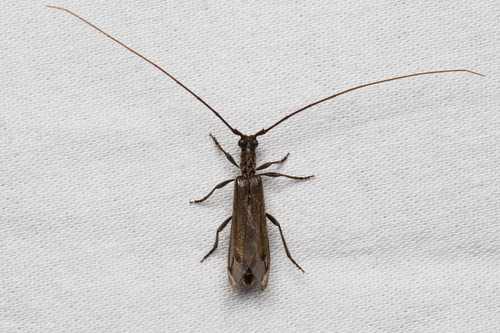
- Styloxus fulleri

Scientific classification
- Kingdom: Animalia
- Phylum: Arthropoda
- Class: Insecta
- Order: Coleoptera
- Suborder: Polyphaga
- Infraorder: Cucujiformia
- Family: Cerambycidae
- Subfamily: Cerambycinae
- Tribe: Methiini
- Genus: Styloxus; LeConte, 1873

= Styloxus =

Genus of beetles

Styloxus is a genus of beetles in the family Cerambycidae, containing the following species:

- Styloxus angelesae Noguera, 2005
- Styloxus bicolor (Champlain & Knull, 1922)
- Styloxus fulleri (Horn, 1880)
- Styloxus fuscus Chemsak & Linsley, 1964
- Styloxus lucanus LeConte, 1873
- Styloxus oblatipilis Chemsak & Linsley, 1964
- Styloxus parvulus Chemsak & Linsley, 1964
