= Ballysteen Limestone =

Geological formation in Ireland

- Stratigraphic range: Carboniferous
- Type: Formation

Location
- Country: Ireland

The Ballysteen Limestone formation is a geologic formation which spans a number of counties in the south of Ireland. It preserves fossils dating back to the Carboniferous period.

== See also ==
- List of fossiliferous stratigraphic units in Ireland
