= Lane Formation =

Geologic formation in Ireland

- Stratigraphic range: Carboniferous
- Type: Formation

Location
- Country: Ireland

The Lane Formation is a geologic formation in Ireland. It preserves fossils dating back to the Carboniferous period.

== See also ==
- List of fossiliferous stratigraphic units in Ireland
