= Ferrater =

Ferrater is a surname. Notable people with the surname include:

- Gabriel Ferrater (1922–1972), Spanish author, translator, and scholar
- José Ferrater Mora (1912–1991), Catalan philosopher, essayist, and writer

== See also ==
- Ferriter
