= Styloxus angelesae =

Scientific classification
- Kingdom: Animalia
- Phylum: Arthropoda
- Class: Insecta
- Order: Coleoptera
- Suborder: Polyphaga
- Infraorder: Cucujiformia
- Family: Cerambycidae
- Genus: Styloxus
- Species: S. angelesae

Binomial name
- Styloxus angelesae Noguera, 2005

Species of beetle

Styloxus angelesae is a species of beetle in the family Cerambycidae. It was described by Noguera in 2005.
