= Ribband Group =

Geologic group in Ireland

- Stratigraphic range: Cambrian to Mid Ordovician
- Type: Group

Location
- Country: Ireland

The Ribband Group is a geologic group in south-eastern Ireland. It is the most extensive stratigraphic unit in this part of Ireland. It underlies much of County Wexford. It overlies the Bray Group and Cahore Group. It is made up of medium to dark grey laminated greywacke siltstones and mudstones with occasional green beds. Turbidite structures are locally prominent and the unit is dominantly a distal turbidite succession. Intercalated volcanic rocks are locally abundant. The ages of the rocks of the group range from the Cambrian to the Ordovician, Middle Cambrian-Llanvirn (Middle Ordovician).

The Ribband group is one of the four Early Palaeozoic stratigraphic groups in SE Ireland. The others are: the Bray group (made up of laterally-derived flysch) which is conformably overlain by the Ribband Group; the Duncannon Group (a highly faulted, predominantly volcanic, platform sequence) which unconformably overlies the Ribband Group except in the west; the Kilcullen Group in the Comeragh Mountains, which is composed of sand-dominant turbidites (lower Ordovician to at least the Llandovery Epoch of the Silurian) which are conformably underlain by the Ribband and Duncannon Groups. The sediments of the Ribband group pass upward into the Kilcullen Group turbidites. This reflects a continuous period of flysch sedimentation.

Although most of the Group is unfossiliferous (without fossils), locally sparse graptolite faunas and acritarchs have been found. Their dating range from the Drumian stage of the Cambrian to the Early-Mid Ordovician.

== Geological formations related to the Ribband Group ==
The following is a classification by Brück & Molyneux (2011).

- The Askingarran Formation forms a continuation of the Ribband Group which overlies it. Its top is faulted against the Tremadocian Ballyhoge Formation of the Ribband group. It is made up of black and grey laminated siltstones and mudstones with occasional green beds and common internal and external turbidite structures. It correlates with the Booley Bay Formation at Booley Bay and Clammers Point. These two formations comprise the oldest strata assigned to the Ribband Group.
- The Polldarrig Formation of the Cullenstown Group (which stretches north-eastwards from Cullenstown Strand to Wexford town) is made up of grey and green, fine grained, laminated greywackes and shales and is the local equivalent of the Booley Bay Formation.
- The Booley Bay Formation comprises much of the northern part of Hook Head (south County Wexford) and extends west of Waterford Harbour (County Waterford).
- The lithologies of the Cahore Group are indistinguishable from those of the Booley Bay Formation. The group passes up northwards into the Ribband Group and the boundary between them is faulted. Unlike the Ribband Group, which extends into the Ordovician, it is entirely Cambrian.
- The Maulin Formation (Counties Wicklow and Carlow) stretches 100 km southwards from Dublin Bay to County Carlow. It is made up of Ribband Group lithologies and includes dark grey phyllites, slates and thin grey quartzites. It is 900m thick in northern County Wicklow.

The Ballymadder Shear Zone (just east of Hook Head on the coast of south County Wexford), separates a to some extent different Cambrian succession immediately to the east to the one to its west. To its west the Clammers Point Unit (in the Bannow area) exposes a coastal section comprising Cahore Group and Ribband Group sediments.

== See also ==
- List of fossiliferous stratigraphic units in Ireland

== Bibliography ==
- Various Contributors to the Paleobiology Database. "Fossilworks: Gateway to the Paleobiology Database". Archived from the original on 25 March 2022.
- Brück P.M., Gardiner P.R.R, T. J. Reeves T.J., Shannon P.M., Colthurst J.R.J., Feely M., Penney S.R., Smith D. G., and M. Vanguestaine M., 1979, South-east Ireland: Lower Palaeozoic stratigraphy and depositional history, Geological Society, London, Special Publications, Vol. 8, pp., 533-544
- Brück P. M., Vanguestaine M., 2004, Acritarchs from the Lower Palaeozoic succession on the south County Wexford coast, Ireland: new age constraints for the Cullenstown Formation and the Cahore and Ribband Groups. Geological Journal, Vol. 39, pp. 199–224
- Brück, P.M., Molyneux, S.G., 2011, Cambrian of Ireland, chapter 12 in: Rushton, A.W.A., Brück, P.M., Molyneux, S.G., Williams, M. & Woodcock, N.H., A Revised Correlation of the Cambrian Rocks in the British Isles, Geological Society, London, Special Report, 25, pp. 42–52.
- Cocks, L.R.M., Fortey, R.A., Rushton, A.W.A. 2010. Correlation for the Lower Palaeozoic. Geological Magazine, Vol. 147, pp. 171–180.
- Harper, D.A.T., Parkes, M.A. 2000. Chapter on Ireland in: A revised correlation of Ordovician Rocks in the British Isles. Geological Society of London Special Report, No 24, pp. 52–68.
- McConnell B.J., Morris J.H., Kennan P.S., 1999, A comparison of the Ribband Group (south-eastern Ireland) to the Manx Group (Isle of Man) and Skiddaw Group (north-western England) in: Woodcock, N.H., Quirk, D.G., Fitches, W.R. BARNES, R.P. (eds) In Sight of the Suture: the Palaeozoic Geology of the Isle of Man in its Iapetus Ocean context, Geological Society, London, Special Publications, Vol. 160, pp. 337–343
- McIlroy D., Additional Ichnotaxa from the Flysch-Type Deposits of the Arenig Ribband Group, Co. Wexford, Ireland, 1999, Irish Journal of Earth Sciences, Vol. 17, pp. 103–113https://www.jstor.org/stable/30002288
- Rushton, A.W.A., Brück, P.M., Molyneux, S.G., Williams, M., Woodcock, N.H., 2011, A Revised Correlation of the Cambrian Rocks in the British Isles. Geological Society, London, Special Report Vol. 25, pp. 42–52.
- Vanguestaine M., Brück P.M., (2008), A Middle and Late Cambrian age for the Booley Bay Formation, County Wexford, Ireland: New acritarch data and its implications. Revue de Micropalaeontologie, Vol.51, pp. 67–95
