= Hister abbreviatus =

Scientific classification
- Kingdom: Animalia
- Phylum: Arthropoda
- Class: Insecta
- Order: Coleoptera
- Suborder: Polyphaga
- Infraorder: Staphyliniformia
- Family: Histeridae
- Genus: Hister
- Species: H. abbreviatus

Binomial name
- Hister abbreviatus Fabricius, 1775

Synonyms
- Hister coloradensis Casey, 1924

Species of beetle

Hister abbreviatus is a species of clown beetle in the family Histeridae. It is found in Central America and North America.
