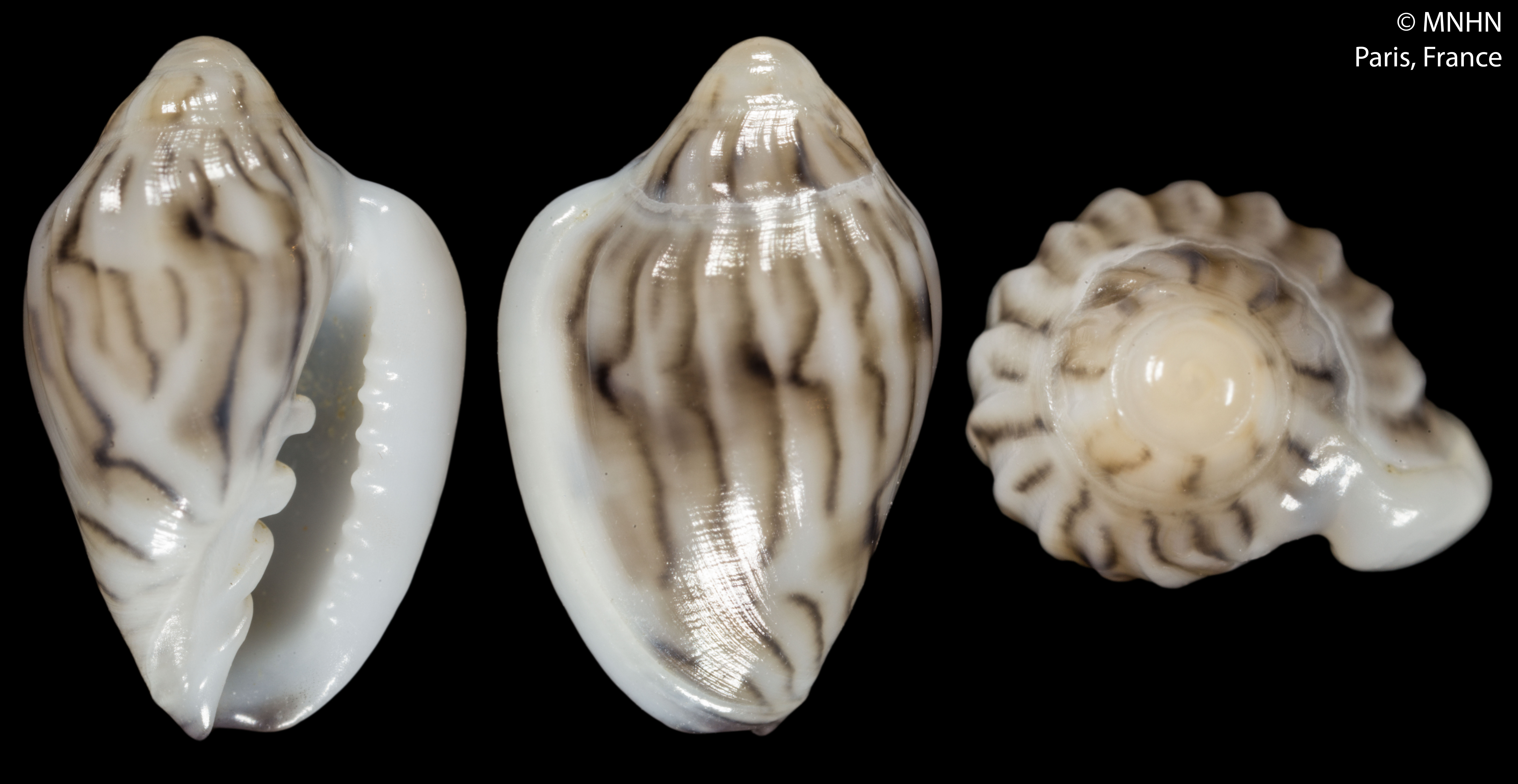
- Shell of Glabella xicoi (holotype at MNHN, Paris)

Scientific classification
- Kingdom: Animalia
- Phylum: Mollusca
- Class: Gastropoda
- Subclass: Caenogastropoda
- Order: Neogastropoda
- Family: Marginellidae
- Genus: Glabella
- Species: G. xicoi

Binomial name
- Glabella xicoi (Boyer, Ryall & Wakefield, 1999)

Synonyms
- Marginella xicoi Boyer, Ryall & Wakefield, 1999

= Glabella xicoi =

Species of gastropod

Glabella xicoi is a species of sea snail, a marine gastropod mollusk in the family Marginellidae, the margin snails.

== Distribution ==
This marine species occurs off Ghana.
