= Murrisk Group =

Geologic group in Ireland

- Stratigraphic range: Ordovician
- Type: Group

Location
- Country: Ireland

The Murrisk Group is a geologic group in Ireland. It preserves fossils dating back to the Ordovician period.

== See also ==
- List of fossiliferous stratigraphic units in Ireland
