= Duncannon Group =

- Stratigraphic range: Ordovician
- Type: Group

Location
- Country: Ireland

The Duncannon Group is a geologic group in County Meath, Ireland. It preserves fossils dating back to the Ordovician period.

== See also ==
- List of fossiliferous stratigraphic units in Ireland
