= Hister servus =

Scientific classification
- Kingdom: Animalia
- Phylum: Arthropoda
- Class: Insecta
- Order: Coleoptera
- Suborder: Polyphaga
- Infraorder: Staphyliniformia
- Family: Histeridae
- Genus: Hister
- Species: H. servus

Binomial name
- Hister servus Erichson, 1834

Species of beetle

Hister servus is a species of clown beetle in the family Histeridae. It is found in the Caribbean Sea, Central America, and North America.
