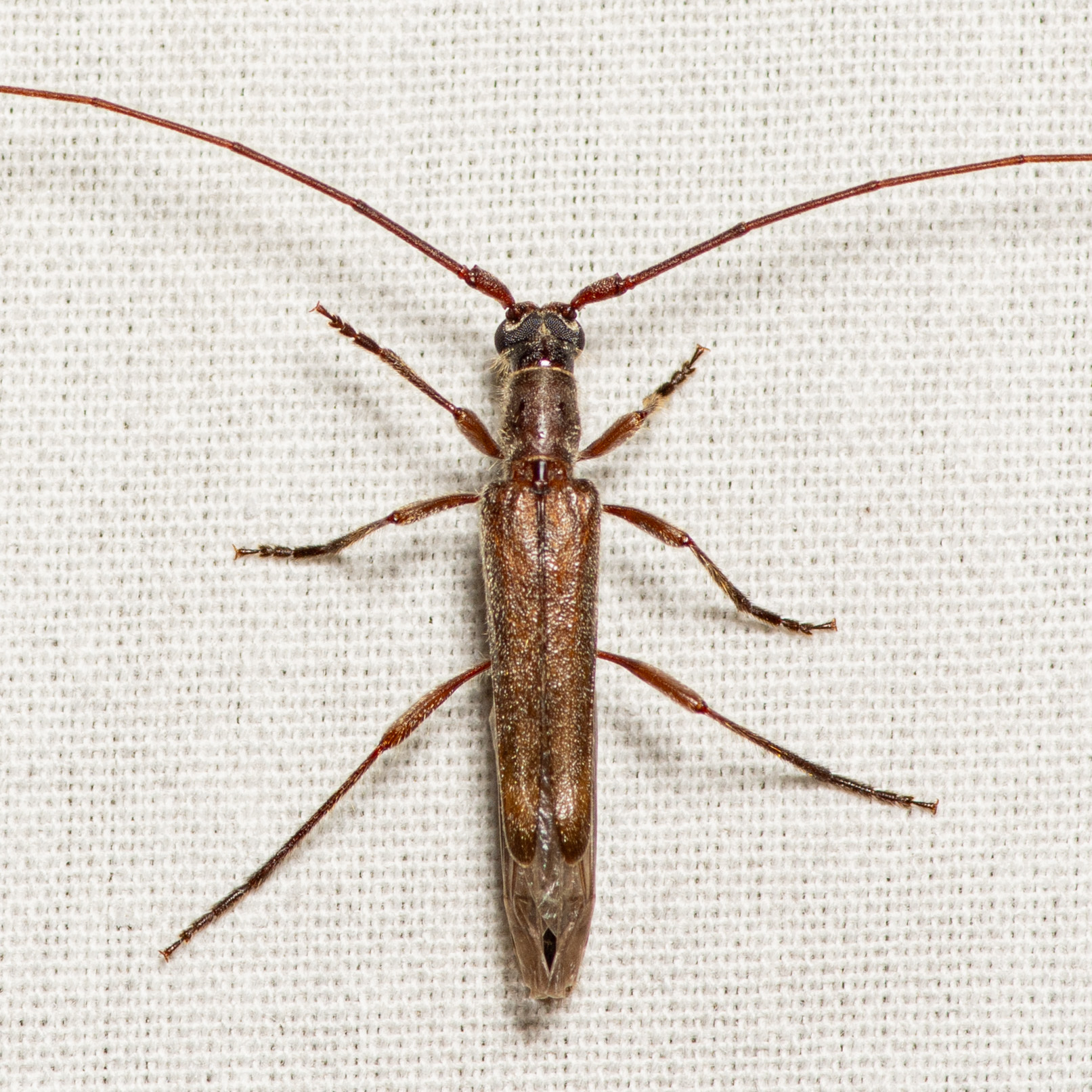

Scientific classification
- Kingdom: Animalia
- Phylum: Arthropoda
- Class: Insecta
- Order: Coleoptera
- Suborder: Polyphaga
- Infraorder: Cucujiformia
- Family: Cerambycidae
- Genus: Styloxus
- Species: S. fulleri

Binomial name
- Styloxus fulleri (Horn, 1880)

= Styloxus fulleri =

Species of beetle

Styloxus fulleri is a species of beetle in the family Cerambycidae. It was described by George Henry Horn in 1880.

== Description ==
The members of the Cerambycidae (Longhorn Beetles) family are named for their long antennae, sometimes exceedingly so. The antennae of males are usually longer than those of females, and often the antennae are attached to the head in a strange notch at the front of the eye.

Styloxus fulleri is a smaller species, at about 12–13 mm in length. The elytra (hardened front wings) do not completely cover the other pair of wings, but end about two-thirds down the length of the body. The antennae are super-long, with very long thin segments. Their eyes are huge on a rather small head.

== Behaviour and ecology ==
Longhorn beetle larvae are called round-headed borers and most feed on dead and decaying wood. Some species feed on living plants. They tunnel inside the wood and so are rarely seen, only emerging as adults. Most species have a limited flight time during which they may be found.

Adult longhorn beetles feed on flower nectar, sap, or leaves and bark. They tend to be strong flyers and are sometimes attracted to lights at night. While individuals of some species are almost always the same size, at times there can be rather pronounced variation, both within the same gender and also between males and females. Males can be much smaller than females.
