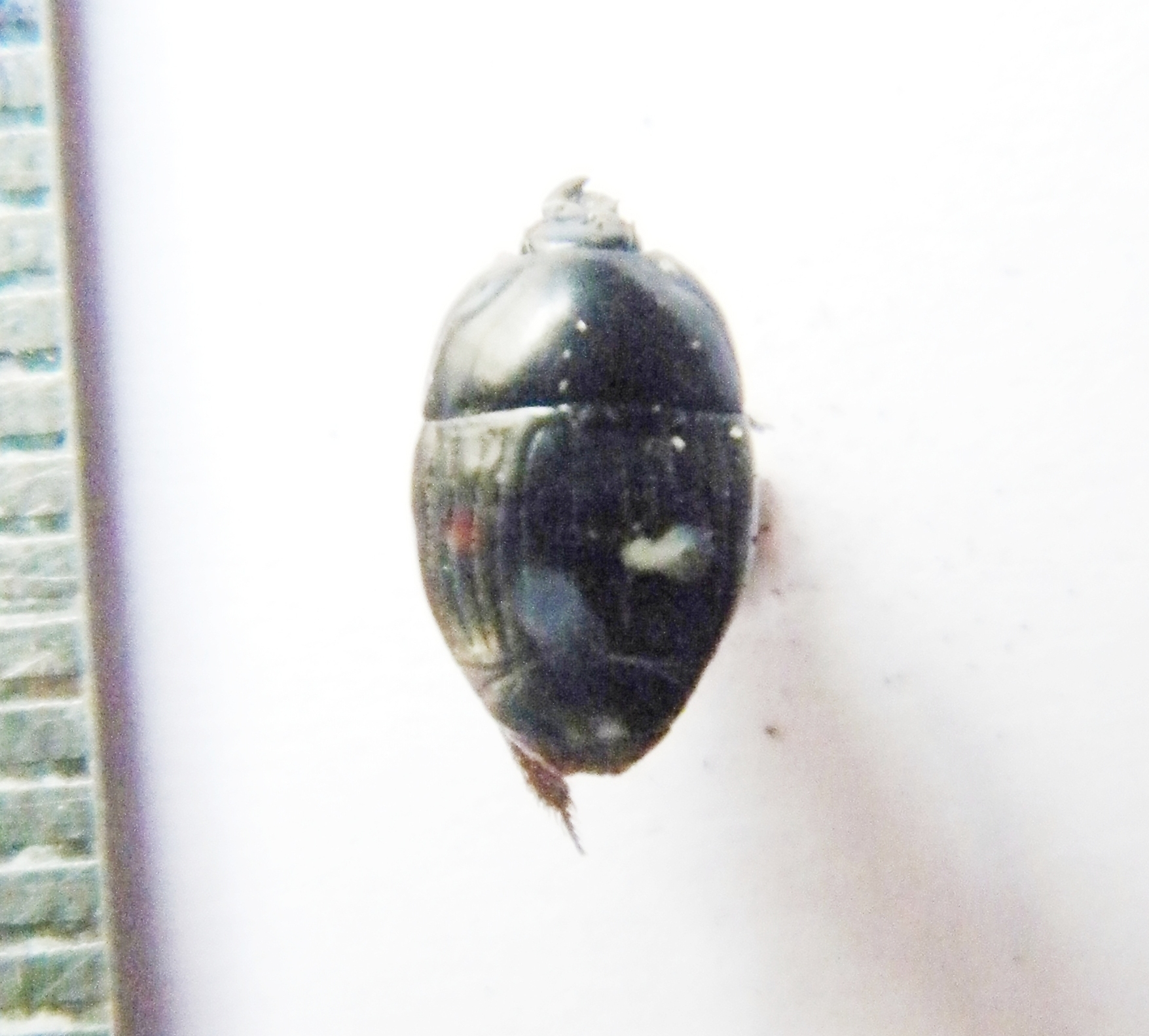

Scientific classification
- Kingdom: Animalia
- Phylum: Arthropoda
- Class: Insecta
- Order: Coleoptera
- Suborder: Polyphaga
- Infraorder: Staphyliniformia
- Family: Histeridae
- Genus: Hister
- Species: H. javanicus

Binomial name
- Hister javanicus Paykull, 1811

Synonyms
- Hister javanicus Ohara, 1989; Hister squalidus Ohara, 1989; Hister septemstriatus Dejean, 1821; Hister coracinus Erichson, 1834; Hister squalidus Erichson, 1834; Hister mandarinus Marseul, 1861; Hister corax Marseul, 1861; Hister carnaticus Lewis, 1885; Hister fortedentatus Desbordes, 1915; Hister angulicollis Bickhardt, 1919

= Hister javanicus =

Species of beetle

Hister javanicus is a species of clown beetle found in many Oriental countries including, Taiwan, Java, eastern India, Sri Lanka, and introduced to Africa.

== Description ==
The Body length of both sexes is about 4.1 to 6.7 mm. The body is oval, and strongly convex and black in color. Their vertex is feebly depressed in the middle. The Prosternal Lobe is rounded at the apex, with complete marginal stria. The Prosternal keel is even, without carinal stria. First to 4th dorsal elytral striae and pronotal marginal stria both are complete. The beetles Propygidium is feebly depressed on each lateral side, and shiny. Propygidium irregularities cover its body. Pygidium convex medially, deeply and coarsely punctate. The Protibia consists of 2 or 3 denticles on the outer margin. Striation of the Elytrae is highly variable according to the geographical distribution. Anterior margin of the pronotum is deeply bisinuate.
