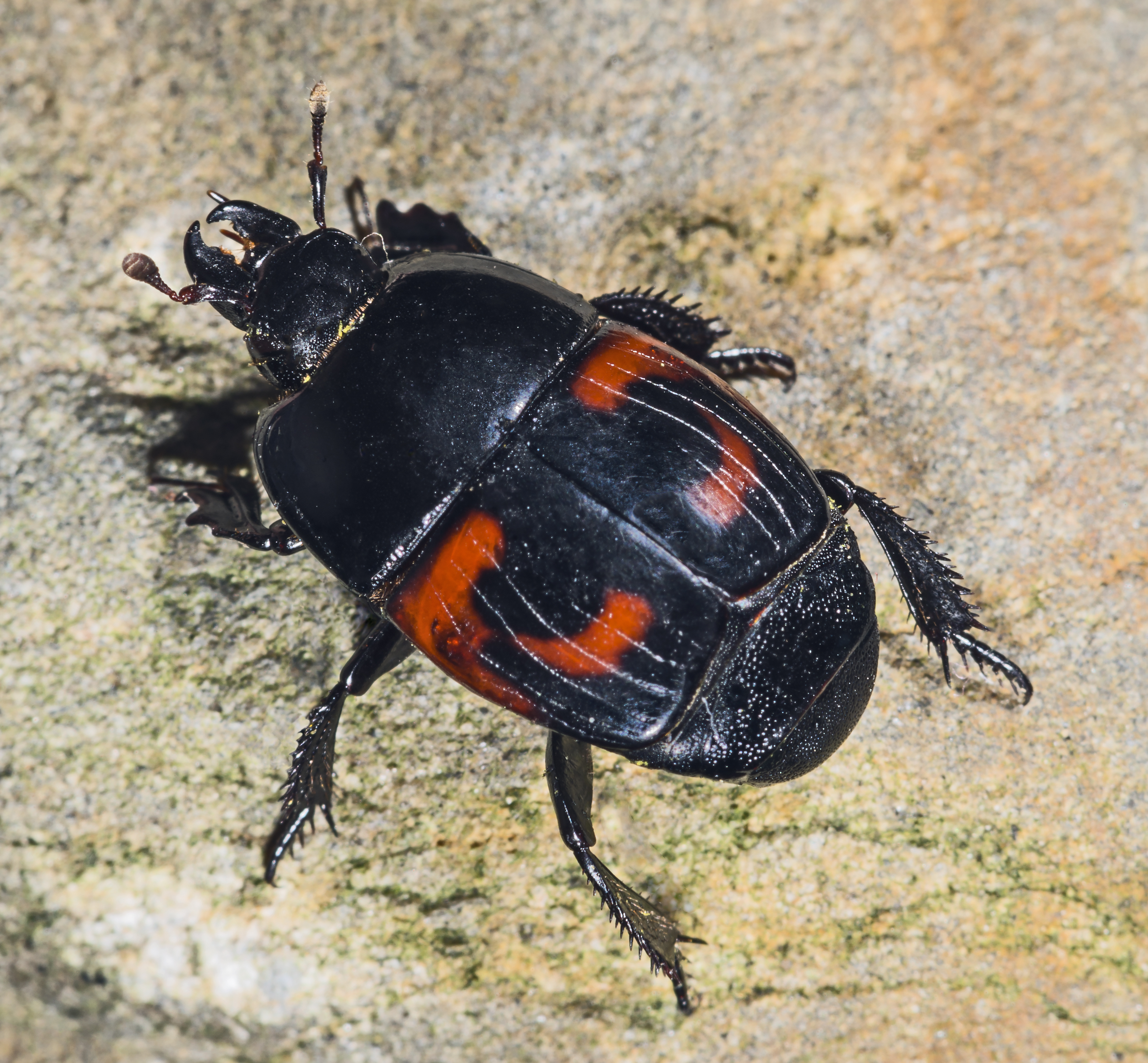

Scientific classification
- Kingdom: Animalia
- Phylum: Arthropoda
- Class: Insecta
- Order: Coleoptera
- Suborder: Polyphaga
- Infraorder: Staphyliniformia
- Family: Histeridae
- Genus: Hister
- Species: H. quadrimaculatus

Binomial name
- Hister quadrimaculatus Linnaeus, 1758

= Hister quadrimaculatus =

Species of beetle

Hister quadrimaculatus is a beetle of the family Histeridae.
