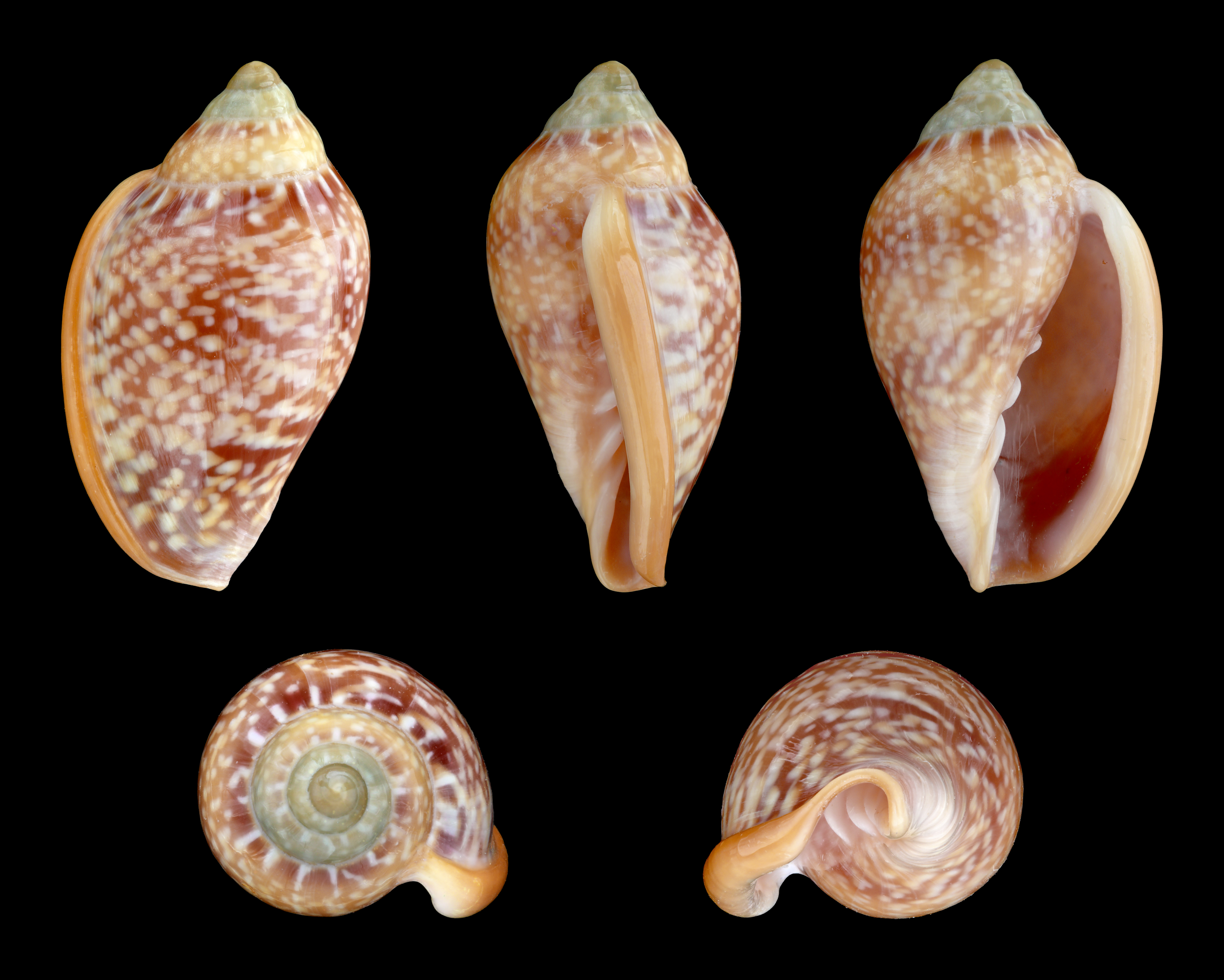

Scientific classification
- Kingdom: Animalia
- Phylum: Mollusca
- Class: Gastropoda
- Subclass: Caenogastropoda
- Order: Neogastropoda
- Family: Marginellidae
- Genus: Marginella
- Species: M. glabella

Binomial name
- Marginella glabella (Linnaeus, 1758)

Synonyms
- Marginella (Marginella) glabella (Linnaeus, 1758)· accepted, alternate representation; Marginella platypus Carriere, 1880; Marginella poucheti Petit de la Saussaye, 1851; Marginella ruffina Swainson, 1840; Porcellana porcelaine Dautzenberg, 1910; Pseudomarginella adansoni Maltzan, 1880 (junior synonym); Voluta glabella Linnaeus, 1758 (original combination)

= Marginella glabella =

Species of gastropod

Marginella glabella is a species of colorful small sea snail, a marine gastropod in the family Marginellidae, the margin shells.

== Description ==
The length of the shell attains 18 mm.

== Distribution ==
This species is found in Northwest Africa, including Cape Verde (doubtful), Mauritania, Senegal; and European waters, including the Canary Islands.
