= Marginella henrikasi =

Scientific classification
- Kingdom: Animalia
- Phylum: Mollusca
- Class: Gastropoda
- Subclass: Caenogastropoda
- Order: Neogastropoda
- Family: Marginellidae
- Genus: Marginella
- Species: M. henrikasi

Binomial name
- Marginella henrikasi Bozzetti, 1995

Synonyms
- Glabella henrikasi (, 1995) (original combination); Marginella (Somaliamarginella) henrikasi Bozzetti, 1995· accepted, alternate representation

Species of gastropod

Marginella henrikasi is a species of sea snail, a marine gastropod mollusk in the family Marginellidae, the margin snails.
