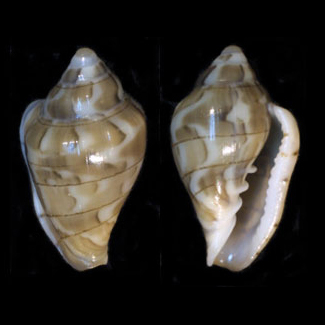
- Apertural (right) and abapertural (left) views of a shell of M. lucani

Scientific classification
- Kingdom: Animalia
- Phylum: Mollusca
- Class: Gastropoda
- Subclass: Caenogastropoda
- Order: Neogastropoda
- Family: Marginellidae
- Genus: Marginella
- Species: M. lucani

Binomial name
- Marginella lucani Jousseaume, 1884

Synonyms
- Glabella lucani (Jousseaume, 1884); Marginella (Marginella) lucani Jousseaume, 1884· accepted, alternate representation

= Marginella lucani =

Species of gastropod

Marginella lucani is a species of sea snail, a marine gastropod mollusk in the family Marginellidae, the margin snails.

== Description ==
The shell size varies between 11 mm and 15 mm.

== Distribution ==
This species occurs in the Atlantic Ocean off Angola.
