= Kingscourt Gypsum =

Geologic formation in Ireland

- Stratigraphic range: Wuchiapingian; ~259–255 Ma
- Type: Formation
- Unit of: New Red Sandstone
- Sub-units: Lower Gypsum, Lower Mudstone, Middle Mudstone, Upper Gypsum & Upper Mudstone Members

Lithology
- Primary: Shale, gypsum
- Other: Mudstone, claystone

Location
- Coordinates: 53.9°N 6.8°W
- Approximate paleocoordinates: 16.0°N 11.5°E
- Region: County Cavan
- Country: Ireland

Type section
- Named for: Kingscourt
- Kingscourt Gypsum (Ireland)

The Kingscourt Gypsum is a geologic formation in Ireland. It preserves fossil flora dating back to the Wuchiapingian stage of the late Permian period.

== Fossil content ==
The formation has provided the following fossils:

Flora

- Jugasporites delasaucei
- Klausipollenites schaubergeri
- Lueckisporites virkkiae
- Nuskoisporites dulhuntyi
- Perisaccus granulatus
- Acritarcha spp.
- Guttulapollenites sp.
- Stellapollenites sp.
- Striatiti spp.
- ?Cycadopites sp.
- ?Rhizomaspora sp.
- Scytinasciae indet.

== See also ==
- List of fossiliferous stratigraphic units in Ireland
