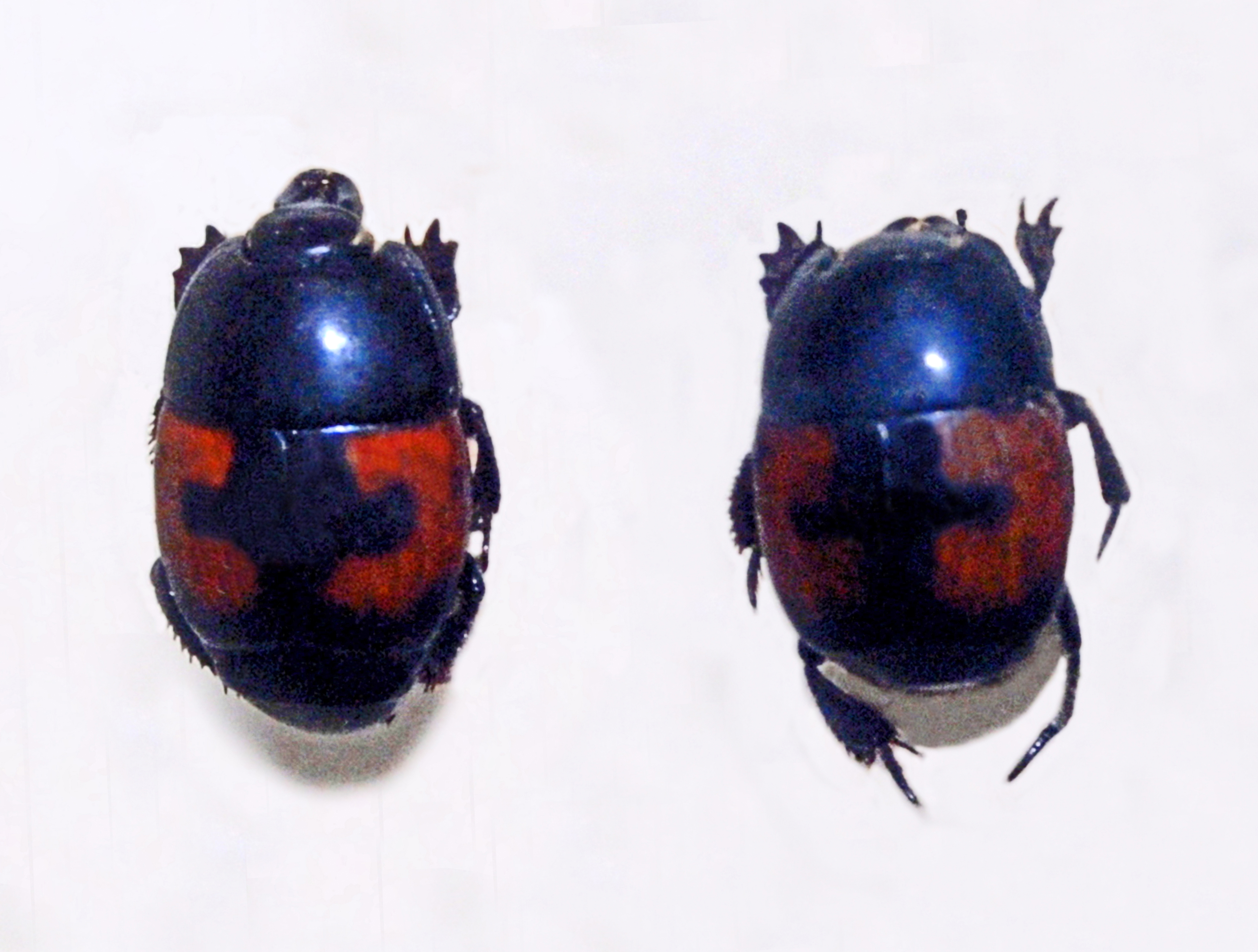
- Hister quadrimaculatus

Scientific classification
- Kingdom: Animalia
- Phylum: Arthropoda
- Clade: Pancrustacea
- Class: Insecta
- Order: Coleoptera
- Suborder: Polyphaga
- Infraorder: Staphyliniformia
- Family: Histeridae
- Tribe: Histerini
- Genus: Hister; Linnaeus, 1758

= Hister (beetle) =

Genus of beetles

Hister is a genus of clown beetles in the family Histeridae. There are at least 210 described species in Hister.

== See also ==
- List of Hister species
