= Marjum Formation =

Geological formation in Utah, United States

- Stratigraphic range: Middle Cambrian, Drumian
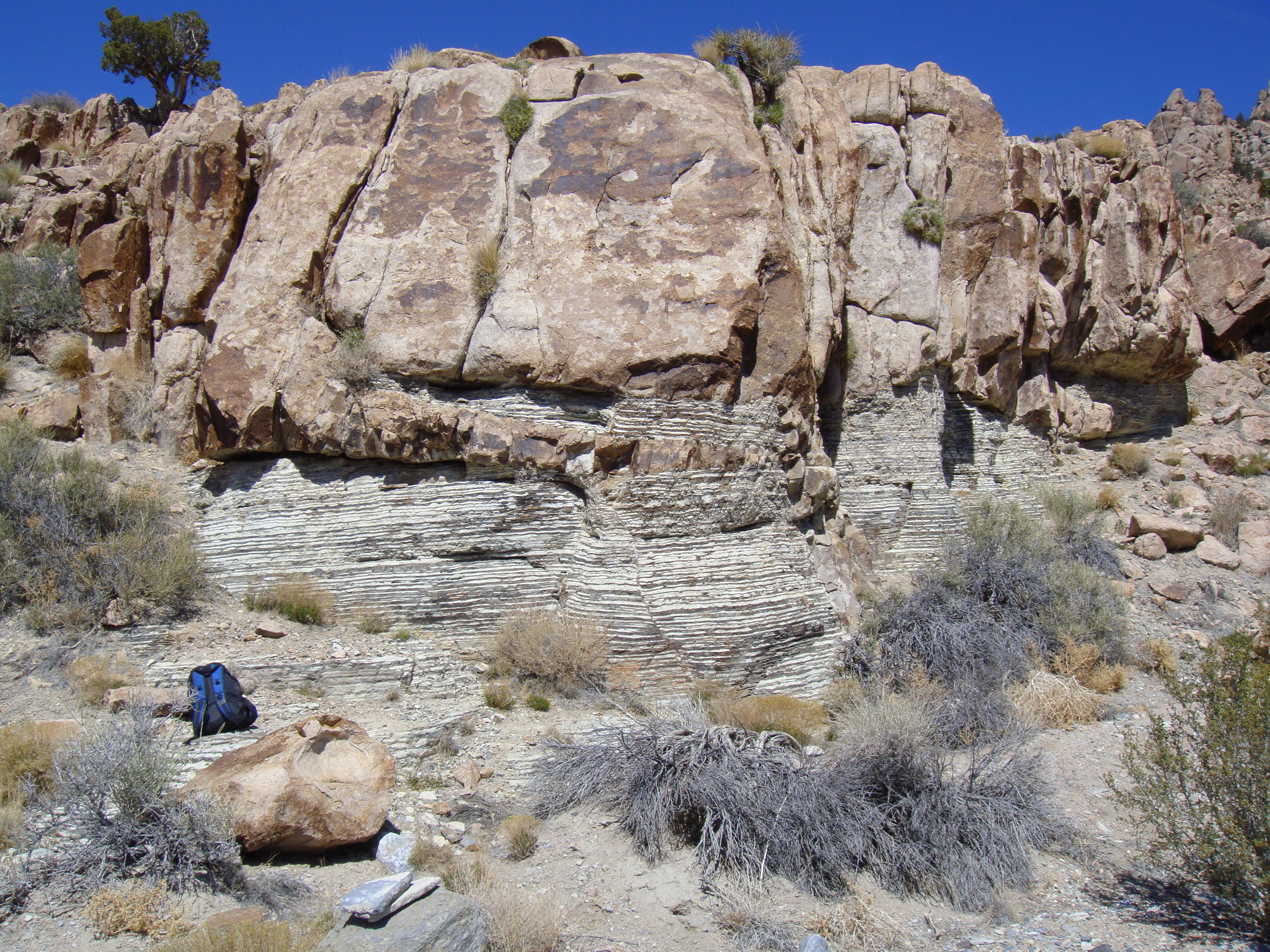
- Notch Peak Sill intruding into the layers of white marble and grey argillite of the Marjum Formation
- Type: Geological formation
- Overlies: Wheeler Shale
- Thickness: Up to 430 meters

Lithology
- Primary: limestone
- Other: shale, metasedimentary rocks

Location
- Region: Utah
- Country: United States
- Extent: House Range

Type section
- Named for: Marjum Pass
- Named by: Charles D. Walcott
- Year defined: 1908

The Marjum Formation is a Cambrian geological formation that overlies the Wheeler Shale in the House Range, Utah. It is named after its type locality, Marjum Pass, and was defined in 1908. The formation is known for its occasional preservation of soft-bodied tissue, and is slightly younger than the Burgess Shale, falling in the Ptychagnostus praecurrens trilobite zone.

== Fossil content ==
Color key
Taxon	Reclassified taxon	Taxon falsely reported as present	Dubious taxon or junior synonym	Ichnotaxon	Ootaxon	Morphotaxon

Notes
Uncertain or tentative taxa are in small text; ~~crossed out~~ taxa are discredited.

=== Ambulacrarians ===
Ambulacrarians reported from the Marjum Formation
Genus	Species	Presence	Material	Notes	Images
Castericystis	C. vali		Numerous specimens.	A solutan.	
Eldonia	E. ludwigi	Marjum Pass (Ptychagnostus punctuosus Zone).	SM X.50204.1 (part) & SM X.50204.2 (counterpart).	A cambroernid.	
Marjumicystis	M. mettae		7 specimens.	An eocrinoid.	
Mastigograptus	M. sp.		A single specimen.	A mastigograptid graptolite.	
Totiglobus	T.? lloydi	Locality 811.	1 specimen (USNM 172047).	An edrioasteroid.	

=== Arthropods ===
Arthropods reported from the Marjum Formation
Genus	Species	Presence	Material	Notes	Images
Anomalocaris	A. nathorsti	Sponge Gully.	Partial body (USNM 374593).	Species moved to the genus Peytoia.	
Asaphiscus	A. wheeleri	Bathyuriscus fimbriatus Subzone.		A ptychopariid trilobite.	
Baltagnostus	B. eurypyx	All subzones of the Bolaspidella Zone.	Multiple specimens.	A diplagnostid trilobite.	
Bathyuriscidella	B. aff. B. amplicauda	Bolaspidella contracta Subzone.	3 pygidia.	A dolichometopid trilobite.	
Bathyuriscus	B. elegans	Bolaspidella contracta Subzone.	Numerous specimens.	A dolichometopid trilobite.	
Bathyuriscus	B. fimbriatus	Bathyuriscus fimbriatus & lower Bolaspidella contracta Subzone.	Numerous specimens.	A dolichometopid trilobite.	
Bolaspidella	B. contracta	Bolaspidella contracta & lower Lepojyge calva Subzones.		A menomoniid trilobite.	
Bolaspidella	B. housensis	Bathyuriscus fimbriatus Subzone.		A menomoniid trilobite.	
Bolaspidella	B. jarrardi	Localities 347, 391, and 716 (mid-Bolaspidella Zone).	Multiple specimens.	A menomoniid trilobite.	
Branchiocaris	B. pretiosa	Sponge Gully.	3 specimens.	A hymenocarine.	
Buccaspinea	B. cooperi	Kells Knolls locality.	An almost complete specimen (BPM 1108).	A hurdiid, originally reported as Hurdia sp.	
Burlingia	B. halgedahlae	Localities 347 and 716 (mid-Bolaspidella Zone).	Multiple specimens.	A burlingiid trilobite.	
Caryosyntrips	C. camurus	'Red Wash' locality.	2 isolated frontal appendages.	A panarthropod of uncertain classification.	
Cotalagnostus	C. laevus	Bolaspidella contracta Subzone.	Over 50 specimens.	A diplagnostid trilobite.	
Cotalagnostus	C. sp.	Bolaspidella contracta Subzone.	A pygidium.	A diplagnostid trilobite.	
Dicranocaris	D. guntherorum	Red Wash, Modocia Flats & Sponge Gully.	4 specimens.	An arthropod of uncertain classification.	
Dytikosicula	D. desmatae	West of Delta, House Range.	1 specimen (SM X.50203).	A putative megacheiran.	
Elrathia	E. alapyge	Bolaspidella contracta & Lejopyge calva Subzones.	Numerous specimens.	A ptychopariid trilobite.	
Elrathia	E. marjumi	Bathyuriscus fimbriatus & Bolaspidella contracta Subzones.	Numerous specimens.	A ptychopariid trilobite.	
Emeraldella	E.? sp.	Red Wash.	Part & counterpart (KUMIP 204791).	An artiopod.	
Hemirhodon	H. amplipyge	Bolaspidella contracta Subzone.	14 incomplete specimens.	A dolichometopid trilobite.	
Holteria	H. problematica	Marjum Pass (Lejopyge calva Subzone).	A pygidium.	A corynexochid trilobite.	
Homagnostus	H. incertus	Bolaspidella contracta Subzone.	Multiple specimens.	An agnostid trilobite.	
Hypagnostus	H. parvifrons	All subzones of the Bolaspidella Assemblage Zone.	Numerous specimens.	A diplagnostid trilobite.	
Itagnostus	I. interstrictus	House Range.		A peronopsid trilobite originally reported as Peronopsis interstricta.	
Leanchoilia	L.? cf. protogonia	Sponge Gully.	Part & counterpart of a complete specimen (UU 06011.01).	A megacheiran.	
Lejopyge	L. calva	Marjum Pass (Lejopyge calva Subzone).	Numerous specimens.	A ptychagnostid trilobite.	
Linguagnostus	L. perplexus	Bolaspidella contracta Subzone.	Over 20 specimens.	A diplagnostid trilobite.	
Marjumia	M. callas	Bolaspidella contracta Subzone.		A marjumiid trilobite.	
Marjumia	M. typa	Bolaspidella contracta Subzone.		A marjumiid trilobite.	
Modocia	M. laevinucha	Bathyuriscus fimbriatus & Bolaspidella contracta Subzones.	Many specimens.	A marjumiid trilobite.	
Modocia	M. nuchaspina	Bolaspidella contracta Subzone.		A marjumiid trilobite.	
Modocia	M. typicalis		50 or more specimens.	A marjumiid trilobite.	
Naraoia	N. compacta	Sponge Gully.	4 specimens.	A naraoiid.	
Neolenus	N. inflatus	East of Antelope Springs.	Multiple specimens & fragments.	A trilobite.	
Neolenus	N. intermedius	East of Antelope Springs.		A trilobite.	
Neolenus	N. intermedius pugio	East of Antelope Springs.	4 specimens of a pygidium.	A trilobite.	
Neolenus	N. superbus	East of Antelope Springs.	Multiple specimens & fragments.	A trilobite.	
Nettapezoura	N. basilika	Sponge Gully.		An arachnomorph.	
Olenoides	O. decorus	Bolaspidella contracta Subzone.	7 specimens.	A dorypygid trilobite.	
Olenoides	O. inflatus	Bolaspidella contracta Subzone.		A dorypygid trilobite.	
Olenoides	O. marjumensis	Bolaspidella contracta Subzone.		A dorypygid trilobite.	
Olenoides	O. pugio	Bolaspidella contracta Subzone.	Numerous specimens.	A dorypygid trilobite.	
Olenoides	O. superbus	Bolaspidella contracta Subzone.	7 specimens.	A dorypygid trilobite.	
Pahvantia	P. hastata	Precise localities unknown.	3 specimens.	A hurdiid.	
Peronopsis	P. interstricta	House Range.	Numerous specimens.	Reassigned to the genus Itagnostus.	
Peronopsis	P. segmenta	House Range.	Multiple specimens.	A peronopsid trilobite.	
Perspicaris	P.? ellipsopelta	Ptychagnostus punctuosus Zone.	Valves & carapaces.	A bivalved arthropod.	
Peytoia	P. nathorsti	Sponge Gully.	Partial body (USNM 374593) & partial mouthpart (KUMIP 314095).	A hurdiid, formerly named Anomalocaris nathorsti.	
Ptychagnostus	P. akanthodes	Bolaspidella contracta Subzone.	Numerous specimens.	A ptychagnostid trilobite.	
Ptychagnostus	P. atavus	House Range.		A ptychagnostid trilobite.	
Ptychagnostus	P. hybridus	Bolaspidella contracta Subzone.	About 10 specimens.	A ptychagnostid trilobite.	
Ptychagnostus	P. richmondensis	Bathyuriscus fimbriatus Subzone.	Numerous specimens.	A ptychagnostid trilobite.	
Ptychagnostus	P. sp.	Bolaspidella contracta Subzone.	At least 5 pygidia.	A ptychagnostid trilobite.	
Trymataspis	T. depressa	Bolaspidella contracta Subzone.	Over 30 specimens.	A lonchocephalid trilobite.	
Trymataspis	T. lomaleie	Bolaspidella contracta Subzone.	10 cranidia.	A lonchocephalid trilobite.	
Trymataspis	T. pristina	Bolaspidella contracta Subzone.	Over 20 cranidia.	A lonchocephalid trilobite.	
Tuzoia	T. guntheri	Ptychagnostus punctuosus Zone.	Multiple valves & carapaces.	A hymenocarine.	
Utagnostus	U. trispinulus	Bolaspidella contracta & Lejopyge calva Subzones.	Multiple specimens.	An agnostid trilobite.	
Utaspis	U. marjumensis	House Range & Wheeler Amphitheater.		A ptychopariid trilobite.	
Zacanthoides	Z. sp.	Wheeler Amphitheater (Bolaspidella contracta Subzone).	A cranidium.	A zacanthoidid trilobite.	

=== Chancelloriids ===
Chancelloriids reported from the Marjum Formation
Genus	Species	Presence	Material	Notes	Images
Chancelloria	C. sp.	Bathyuriscus fimbriatus & Bolaspidella contracta Subzones.	About 20 spicules.	A chancelloriid.	

=== Chordates ===
Chordates reported from the Marjum Formation
Genus	Species	Presence	Material	Notes	Images
Megasiphon	M. thylakos	House Range.	One specimen (UMNH.IP.6079).	A tunicate.	
Nuucichthys	N. rhynchocephalus	House range.	One specimen (UMNH.IP.6084)	A basal chordate related to Metaspriggina.	
Skeemella	S. clavula	North of Red Wash (Ptychagnostus punctuosus Biozone).	2 specimens (KUMIP 314102 & KUMIP 314103).	A vetulicolian.	

=== Cnidarians ===
Moon, Caron & Moysiuk (2023) considered these fossils would be ctenophores instead.

Cnidarians reported from the Marjum Formation
Genus	Species	Presence	Material	Notes	Images
Coronatae?	Indeterminate	Sponge Gully.	1 specimen (UU07021.05).	Originally considered as a scyphozoan jellyfish, may be referrable to the crown jellyfish family, later reclassified to stem-ctenophore Calathites macrocalyx.	
Cubozoa?	Indeterminate	Sponge Gully.	2 specimens (UU07021.01 & UU07021.02).	Specimens possibly referrable to box jellyfish. Later reclassified to stem-ctenophore Calathites macrocalyx and Theiokylinxia cartwrightae.	
Narcomedusae?	Indeterminate	Sponge Gully.	5 specimens (UU07021.03, UU07021.04, UU07021.06, UU07021.07 & UU07021.08).	Originally considered as a hydrozoan tentatively assigned to this family. Later reclassified to stem-ctenophore Theiokylinxia cartwrightae and indeterminate dinomischid for figured specimens.	
Semaeostomeae?	Indeterminate	Sponge Gully.	2 specimens (UU07021.09 & UU07021.10).	Originally considered as a scyphozoan jellyfish tentatively assigned to this family. Later reclassified to indeterminate stem-ctenophore dinomischid.	

=== Ctenophores ===
Ctenophores reported from the Marjum Formation
Genus	Species	Presence	Material	Notes	Images
Calathites	C. macrocalyx	House Range		A stem-group ctenophore within the family Dinomischidae.	
Ctenorhabdotus	C. campanelliformis	House Range (likely from the lower Ptychagnostus punctuosus Zone).	1 specimen (UMNH.IP.6125).	A ctenophore.	
Dinomischidae	Indeterminate	House Range			
Dinomischus	D. nudus	House Range		A stem-group ctenophore within the family Dinomischidae.	
Dinomischus	D. sp. A	House Range		A stem-group ctenophore within the family Dinomischidae.	
Thalassostaphylos	T. elegans	House Range (lower Ptychagnostus punctuosus Zone).	1 specimen (UMNH.IP.6086).	A ctenophore.	
Theiokylixia	T. cartwrightae	House Range		A stem-group ctenophore within the family Dinomischidae.	

=== Lophotrochozoans ===
Lophotrochozoans reported from the Marjum Formation
Genus	Species	Presence	Material	Notes	Images
Acrothele	A. subsidua	Bathyuriscus-Elrathina & Bolaspidella Zones.		A brachiopod.	
Helcionella	"H." arguta	Bathyuriscus fimbriatus & Bolaspidella contracta Subzones.	More than 100 specimens.	A helcionellid.	
Hyolithes	H. sp.	All subzones of the Bolaspidella Zone.	More than 100 specimens.	A hyolith.	
Lingulella	L. sp.	Bathyuriscus fimbriatus & Bolaspidella contracta Subzones.		An obolid brachiopod.	
Micromitra	M. modesta		Multiple specimens.	A paterinide brachiopod.	
Nisusia	N. sulcata		18 specimens.	A kutorginate brachiopod.	
Pegmatreta	P. bellatula	Bathyuriscus fimbriatus & Bolaspidella contracta Subzones.	Numerous specimens.	A brachiopod.	
Pegmatreta	P. ophirensis	All subzones of the Bolaspidella Zone.		A brachiopod.	
Pelagiella	P. sp.	Bolaspidella contracta Subzone.	More than 50 internal molds.	A pelagiellid.	
Prototreta	P. attenuata	Bathyuriscus-Elrathina Zone & Bolaspidella Zone.		A brachiopod.	
Prototreta	P. mimica	Bolaspidella contracta Subzone.		A brachiopod.	
Stenothecoides	S. elongata	Bathyuriscus fimbriatus Subzone.	Over 30 valves.	A stenothecoid.	

=== Scalidophorans ===
Scalidophorans reported from the Marjum Formation
Genus	Species	Presence	Material	Notes	Images
Arrakiscolex	A. aasei	Grey Marjum locality (Ptychagnostus punctuosus Zone).	Cuticle fragments.	A palaeoscolecid also known from the Upper Weeks Formation.	
Ottoia	O. prolifica	Sponge Gully.	A complete individual (KUMIP 204770).	Referral of the specimen to this species is insecure, better classified as O.? sp.	
Ottoia	O.? sp.	Sponge Gully.	A complete individual (KUMIP 204770).	A stem-priapulid, specimen formerly referred to Ottoia prolifica or Scathascolex minor.	
Scathascolex	S. minor	Sponge Gully.	A complete individual (KUMIP 204770).	Specimen reassigned to Ottoia? sp.	
Selkirkia	S. willoughbyi	Sponge Gully.	Tube with associated soft parts (KUMIP 204788).	A stem-priapulid.	

=== Sponges ===
Sponges reported from the Marjum Formation
Genus	Species	Presence	Material	Notes	Images
Choia	C. carteri	Sponge Gulch.		A demosponge.	
Choia	C. hindei	Red Cliffs Wash.	2 specimens & 3 other fragments.	A demosponge.	
Choia	C. utahensis	Sponge Gulch.	Several specimens.	A demosponge.	
Diagoniella	D. cyathiformis	Red Cliffs Wash & Kells Knolls Gulch.	Numerous specimens.	A reticulosan.	
Diagoniella	D. hindei	Sponge Gulch.	Approximately 40 specimens.	A reticulosan.	
Diagoniella	D. magna	Kells Knolls Gulch (Bathyuriscus fimbriatus zone).	A fragment (USNM 535922).	A reticulosan.	
Diagoniella	D. sp.	Sponge Gulch.	2 large fragments.	A reticulosan.	
Hamptonia	H. bowerbanki	Red Cliffs Wash & Sponge Gulch.	Multiple specimens.	A demosponge.	
Hazelia	H. palmata	Near Marjum Pass.	One specimen.	A demosponge.	
Hintzespongia	H. bilamina	Kells Knolls Gulch (Bathyuriscus fimbriatus zone).	Multiple specimens.	A reticulosan.	
Hexactinellida	Indeterminate		Miscellaneous spicules.	Indeterminate glass sponges, originally reported as Hyalospongiae (now a junior synonym).	
Kiwetinokia		Drum Mountains.	4 large slabs.	A reticulosan.	
Leptomitus	L. metta	Red Cliffs Wash locality.	22 specimens.	A demosponge.	
Polygoniella	P. turrelli	House Range	Around 200 specimens	A glass sponge	
Protospongia	P.? elongata	Sponge Gulch.	1 specimen.	A reticulosan.	
Testiispongia	T. venula	Sponge Gulch.	Several specimens.	A glass sponge.	
Valospongia	V. gigantis	Sponge Gulch.		A reticulosan.	
Valospongia	V.? gigantus	Kells Knolls Gulch (Bathyuriscus fimbriatus zone).	A fragment (USNM 535917).	A reticulosan.	

== See also ==
- List of fossiliferous stratigraphic units in Utah
- Paleontology in Utah
