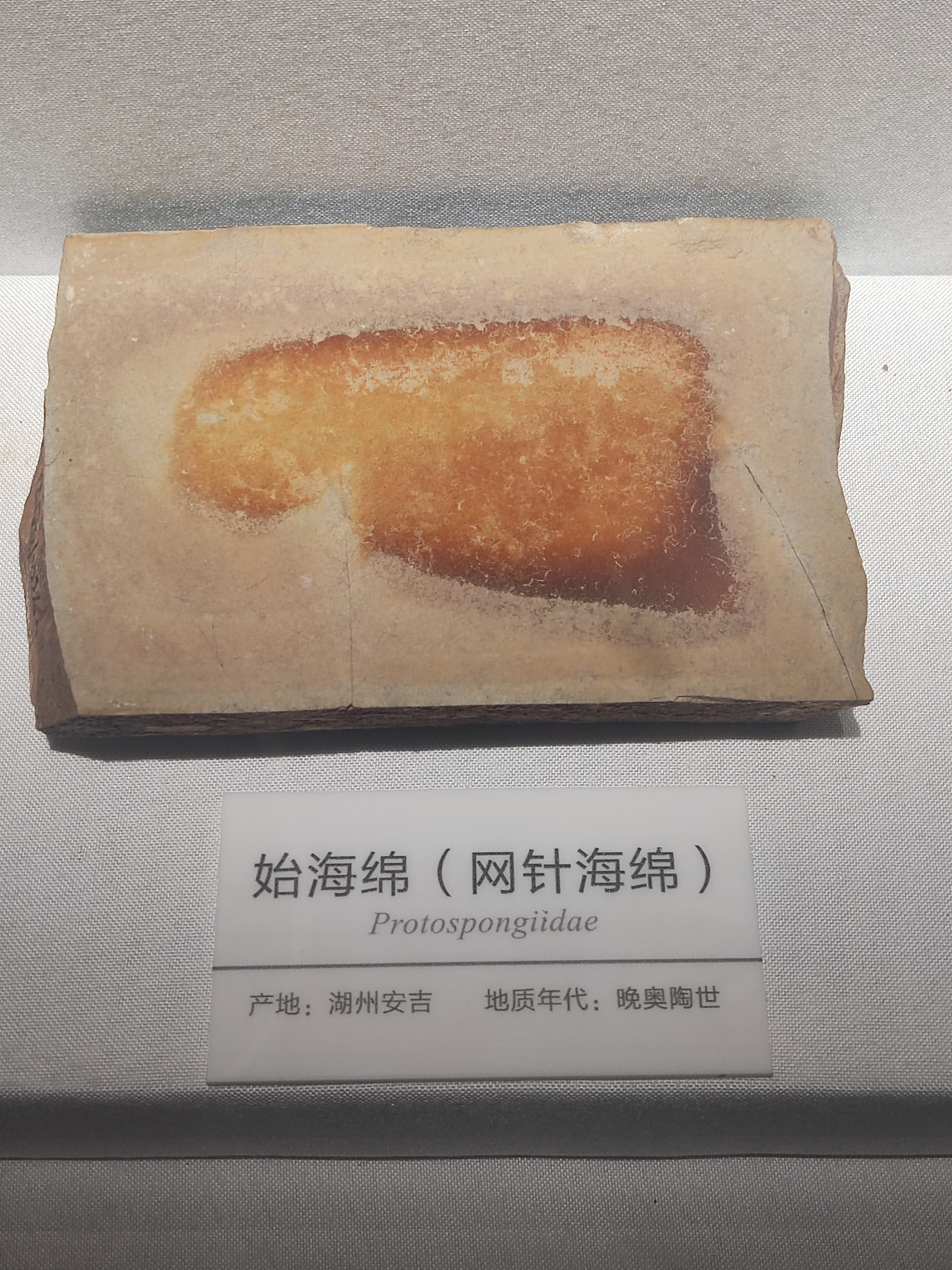
- Indeterminate Protospongiid species from the Zhejiang Museum of Natural History in China.
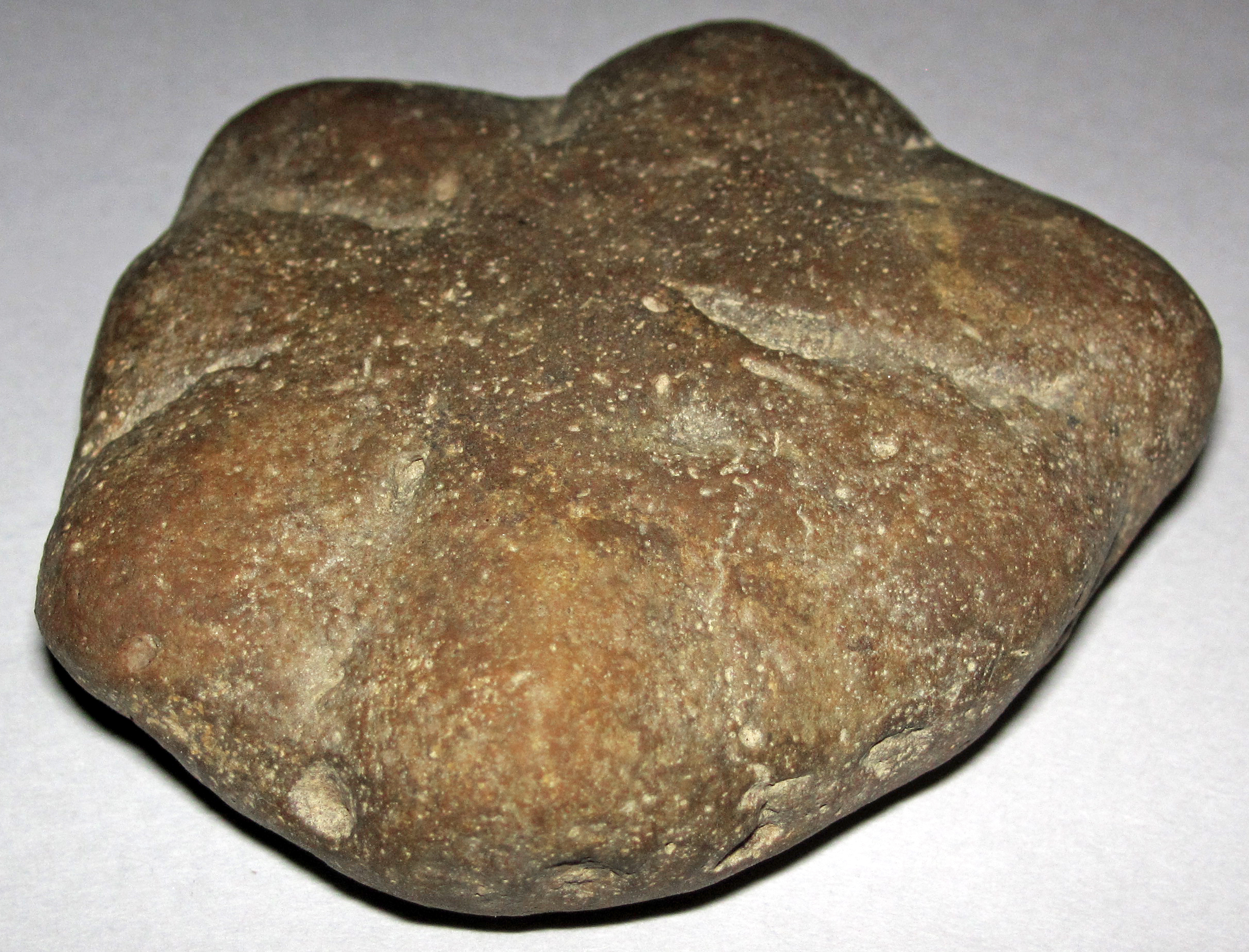
- Brooksella from the Cambrian period of Georgia, United States.

Scientific classification
- Kingdom: Animalia
- Phylum: Porifera
- Class: Hexactinellida
- Order: †Reticulosa
- Family: †Protospongiidae

= Protospongiidae =

Extinct family of sponges

Protospongiidae is an extinct family of hexactinellid sponges that belongs to the order Reticulosa.

== Distribution ==
Fossils in this family have been found worldwide in North America, Greenland, South America, Africa, Europe and Asia.

== Genera ==
This family contains 13 genera. They are listed below:

- Brooksella Bassler, 1941
- Diagoniella Rauff, 1894
- Gabelia Rigby & Murphy, 1983
- Heminectere Botting, 2004
- Hunanospongia Qian & Ding, 1988
- Iberospongia Garcia-Bellieo & Rigby, 2004
- Kiwetinokia Walcott, 1920
- Metaxyspongia Wu, Yang, Janussen, Steiner, & Zhu, 2005
- Protospongia Salter, 1864
- Saetaspongia Mehl & Reitner, 1993
- Sanshapentella Mehl & Erdtmann, 1994
- Stephanella Hinde, 1891
- Triticispongia Mehl & Retiner, 1993
