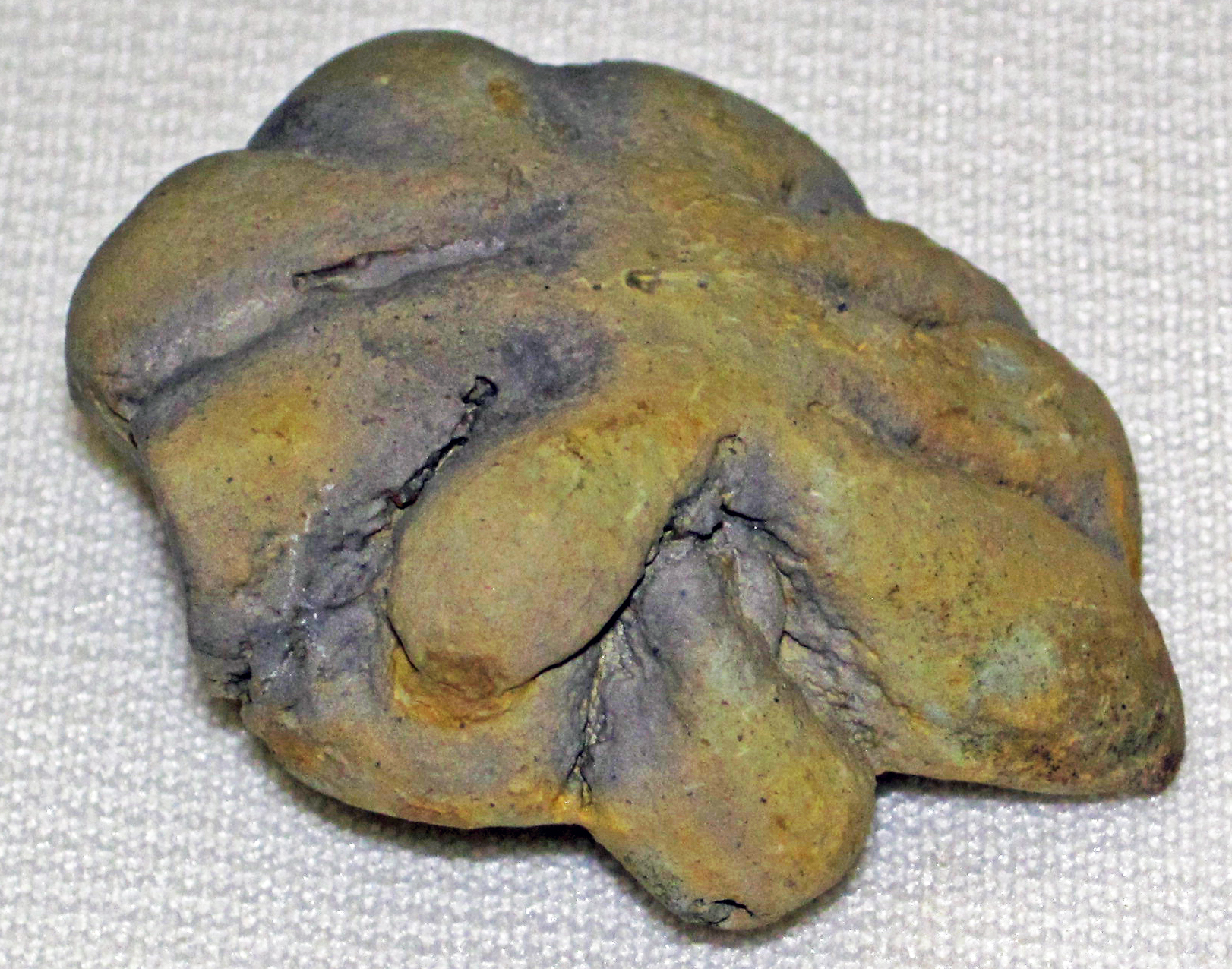

Scientific classification
- Kingdom: Animalia
- Phylum: Porifera
- Class: Hexactinellida
- Order: †Reticulosa
- Family: †Protospongiidae
- Genus: †Brooksella; Walcott, 1896

Type species
- †Brooksella alternata Walcott, 1896

Synonyms
- Genus synonymy: Laotira Walcott, 1896; Species synonymy: Brooksella confusa Walcott, 1896; Laotira cambria Walcott, 1896

= Brooksella =

Brooksella Temporal range: Middle Cambrian

Extinct genus of sponge

Brooksella is an enigmatic star-shaped Cambrian fossil found in the Conasauga Formation of Alabama and Georgia. These fossils are often referred to as "star-cobbles" for their distinct lobate appearance, generally with 6 or more lobes.

Brooksella was first described in 1896 by Charles Doolittle Walcott, who believed them to be medusoid body fossils of cnidarians. Later researchers have offered other explanations, from diagenetic gas bubbles to burrow traces. The most accepted identity is that they are hexactinellid sponges, based on observed spicules, ostia, and internal structure. In 2023, a group of researchers suggested that Brooksella is a pseudofossil, finding no support for previous interpretations of it as a sponge or a trace fossil.
