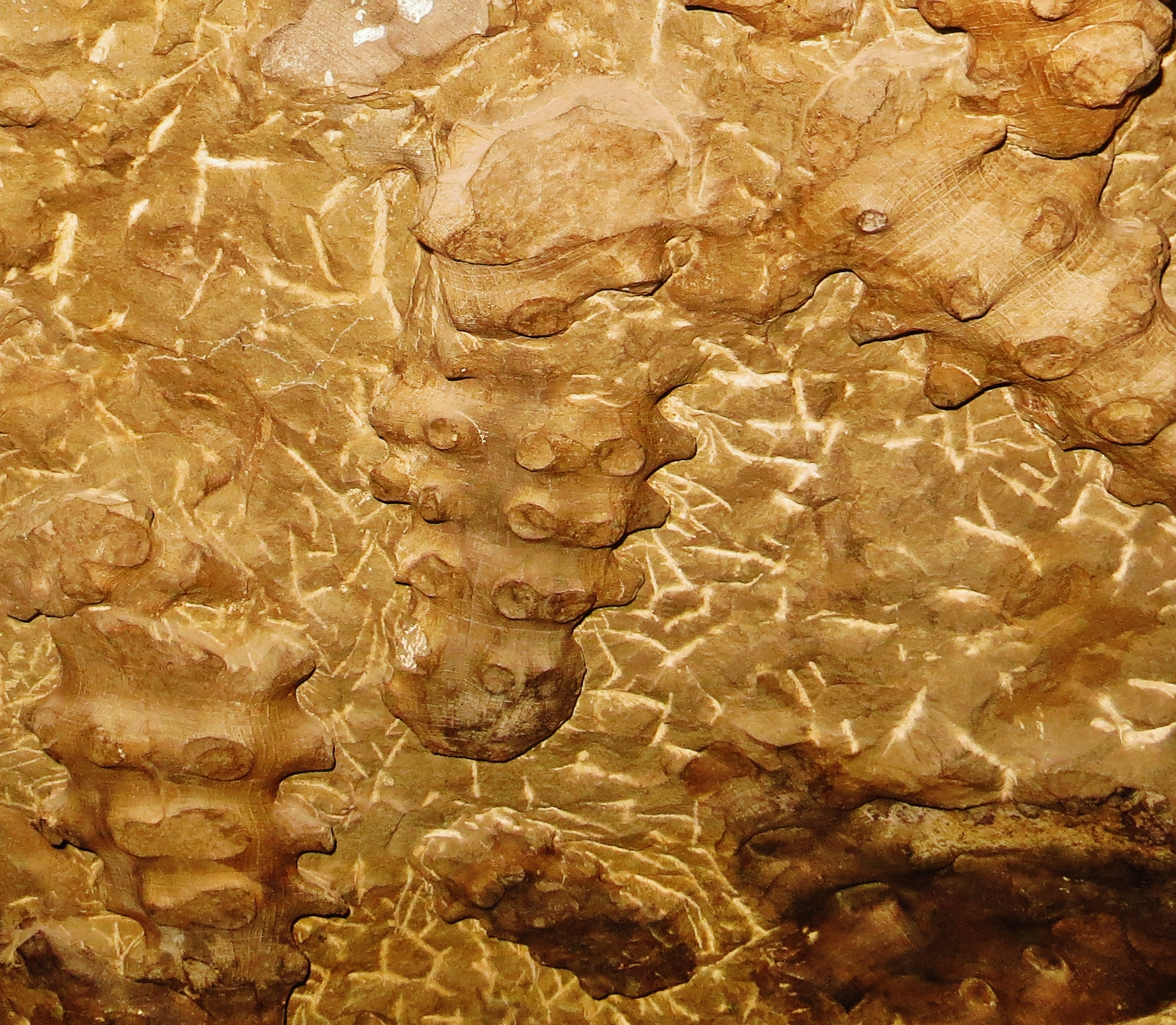
- Hydnoceras bathense specimen on display at the Senckenberg Museum für Naturkunde Görlitz in Germany

Scientific classification
- Kingdom: Animalia
- Phylum: Porifera
- Class: Hexactinellida
- Order: †Reticulosa
- Genus: †Hydnoceras; Conrad, 1842

Species
- Hydnoceras avoca; Hydnoceras bathense; Hydnoceras eutheles; Hydnoceras phymatodes; Hydnoceras tuberosum; Hydnoceras variabile

Synonyms
- Hydroceras Dawson & Hinde, 1889

= Hydnoceras =

Hydnoceras Temporal range: Upper Devonian–Pennsylvanian

Genus of extinct Paleozoic sponges

Hydnoceras is an extinct genus of sponges that existed from the Upper Devonian through the end of the Pennsylvanian.

== Description ==
Hydnoceras specimens are typically around 8.375 inches long, and about 3.5 inches wide. 8 pronounced ridges run down along the length of the sponge and are crossed by horizontal ridges, producing conical swellings at intersections. Hydnoceras fossils' entire surfaces are typically covered by coarse and fine rectangular patterns of narrow, threadlike ridges. The threadlike ridges are produced as a result of the way in which these sponges usually fossilized. Hydnoceras specimens fossilize as internal molds of the actual sponge's skeleton, and the rectangular latticelike ridges are an impression of the sponge's skeleton.

== Distribution ==
Fossils of Hydnoceras sponges have been found in rock formations in the United States, mainly in New York, Pennsylvania, and West Virginia.

== Ecology ==
Hydnoceras species were suspension feeders, and likely remained attached to a single substrate for their entire lives, as typical for a sponge. Unlike modern glass sponges, which typically live in deep marine environments, these sponges lived throughout the marine water column.

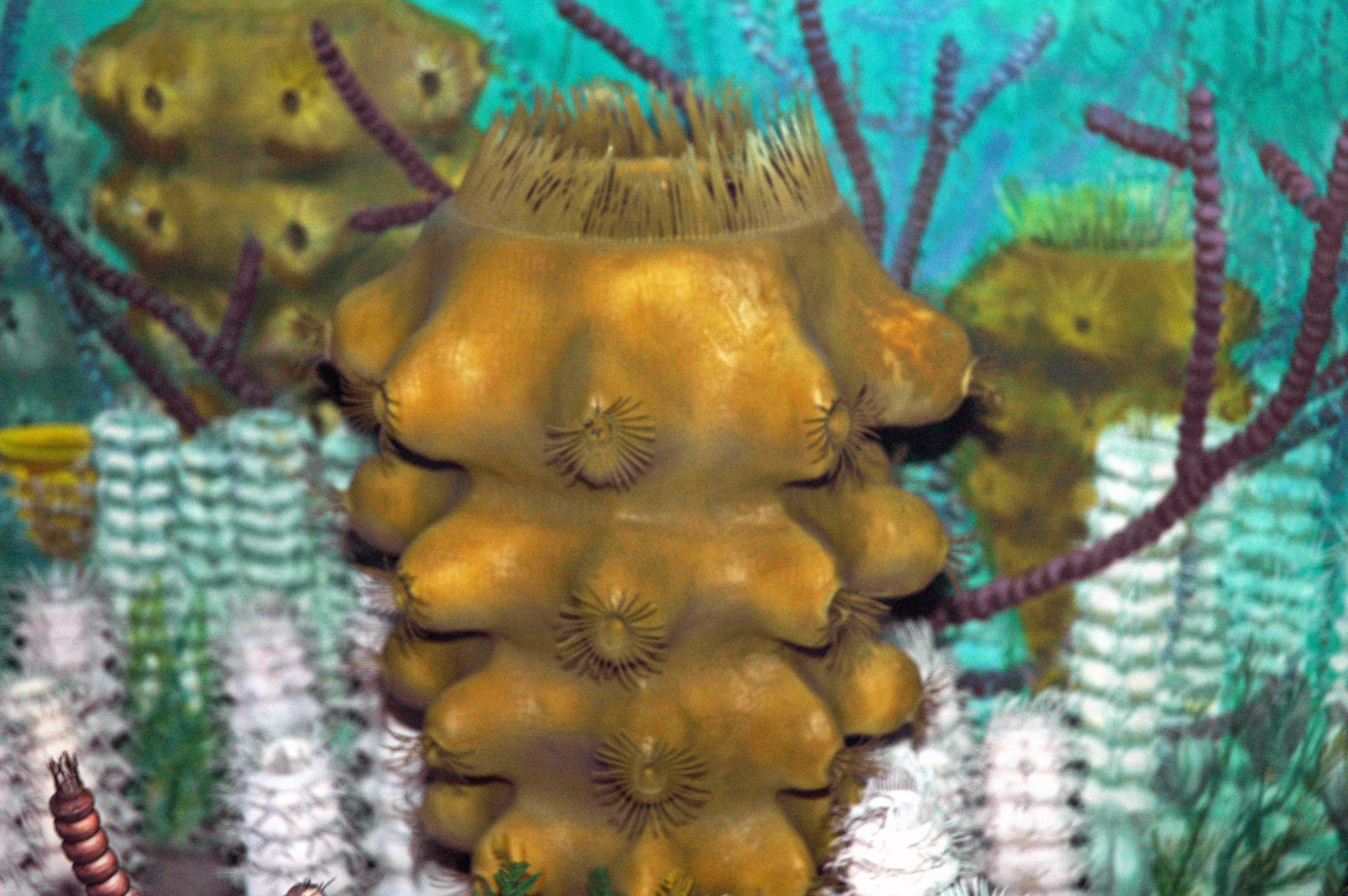
Reconstruction of a Carboniferous seafloor featuring Hydnoceras at the Carnegie Museum of Natural History in Pennsylvania

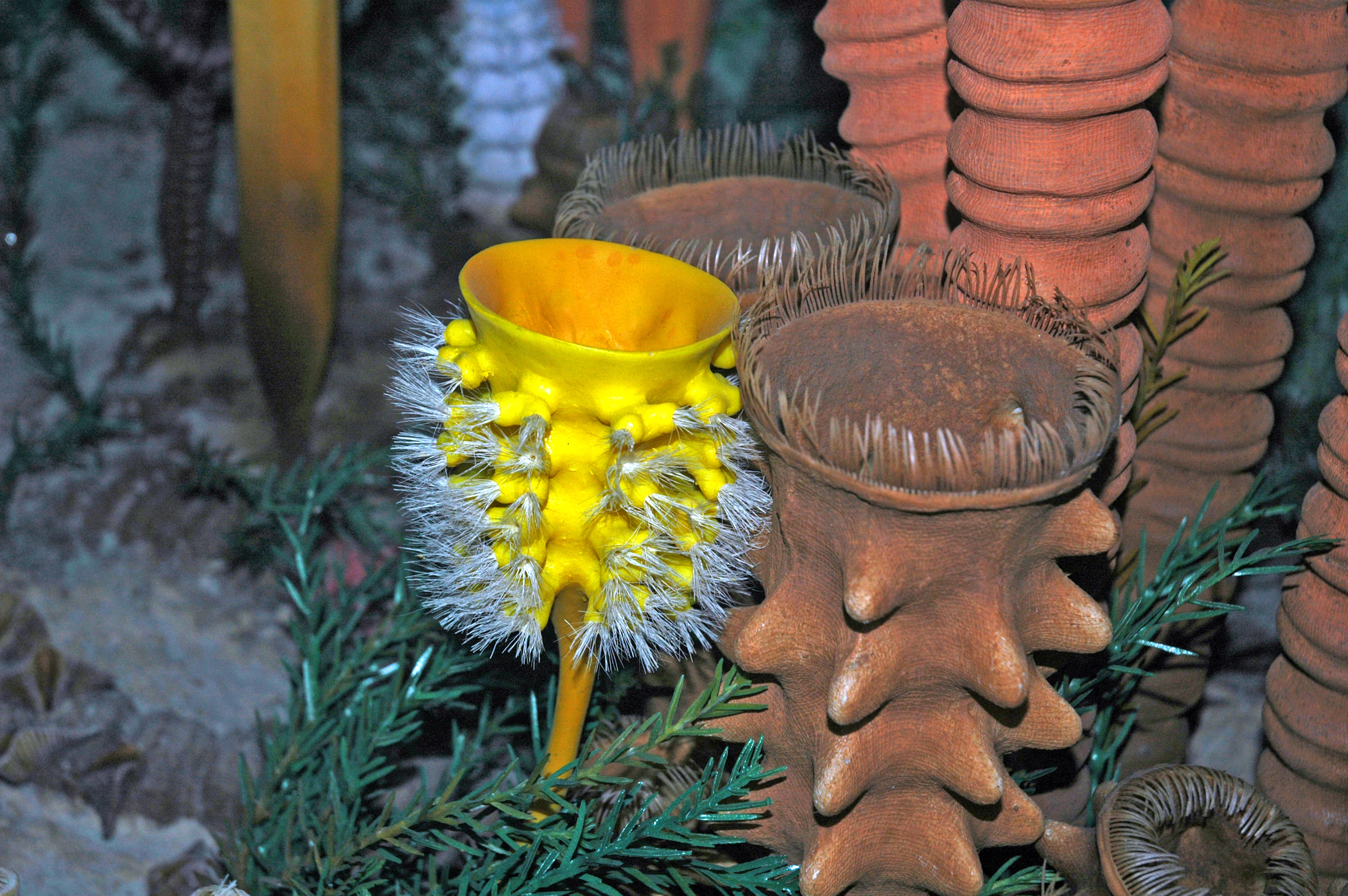
