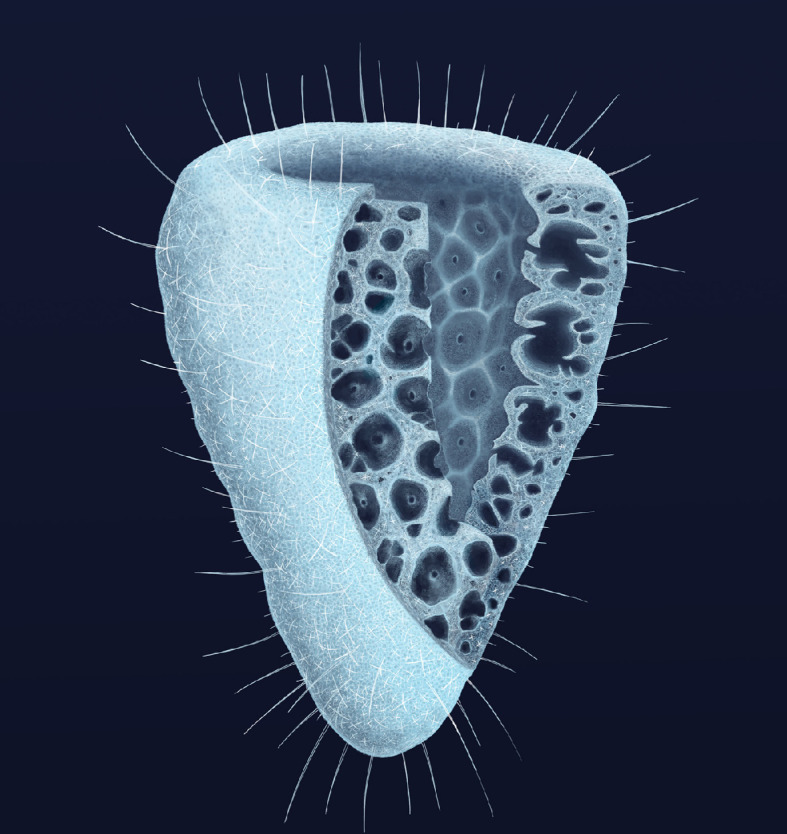
- Reconstruction

Scientific classification
- Kingdom: Animalia
- Phylum: Porifera
- Class: Hexactinellida
- Genus: †Polygoniella; Del Mouro et al., 2024

Type species
- †Polygoniella turrelli Del Mouro et al., 2024

= Polygoniella =

Polygoniella Temporal range: Middle Cambrian, Drumian

Extinct genus of sponges

Polygoniella is an extinct genus of stem-hexactinellid sponge. It is known from the Middle Cambrian Marjum Formation of Utah, United States, and the type species is P. turrelli.

== Discovery and naming ==
Polygoniella turrelli, holotype MCZ.IP.199049, is known from around 190 specimens discovered in a quarry opened at the Gray Marjum site in 2022. A further ten specimens were then documented prior to 2024 and several specimens previously assigned to Diagoniella by Rigby (1983) may have also belonged to Polygoniella. The remains of Polygoniella have also been confused with Valospongia.

Del Mouro et al. (2024) named and described Polygoniella turrelli.

== Description ==
It was an early member of the crown group of Hexactinellida, and its appearance showed that their modern body plan existed since at least the Drumian.
