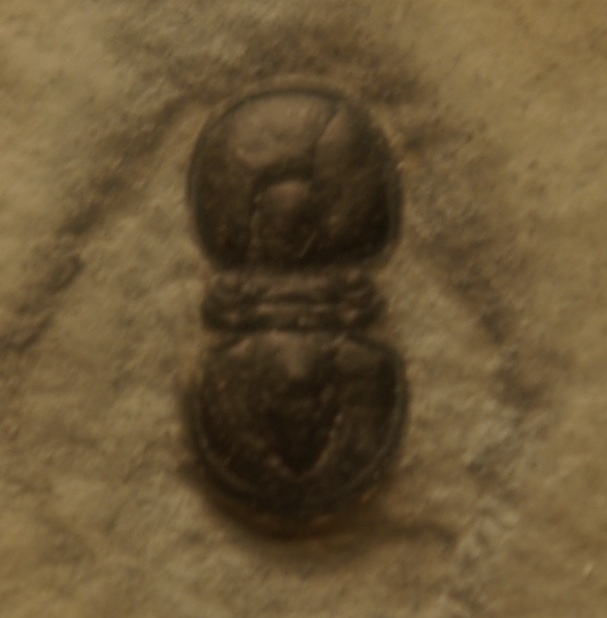

Scientific classification
- Kingdom: Animalia
- Phylum: Arthropoda
- Clade: †Artiopoda
- Class: †Trilobita (?)
- Order: †Agnostida
- Family: †Ptychagnostidae
- Genus: †Ptychagnostus
- Species: †P. atavus

Binomial name
- †Ptychagnostus atavus (Sven Axel Tullberg, 1880)

Synonyms
- Acidusus atavus (Tullberg, 1880); Agnostus atavus Tullberg 1880

= Ptychagnostus atavus =

Ptychagnostus atavus Temporal range: Drumian

Extinct species of trilobite

Ptychagnostus atavus is a species of agnostid trilobite. It was originally described by Swedish paleontologist Sven Axel Tullberg as Agnostus atavus in 1880. It is used in biostratigraphy as an index fossil. Its first appearance at the GSSP section in the Wheeler Shale of Utah is defined as the beginning of the Drumian Age (around 504.5 million years ago) of the Miaolingian (Middle Cambrian).

Laurie (2008) grouped punctuosus and affinis within Ptychagnostus, but preferred to place the closely related atavus within Acidusus.
