= Anomochone =

Scientific classification
- Kingdom: Animalia
- Phylum: Porifera
- Class: Hexactinellida
- Order: Sceptrulophora
- Family: Tretodictyidae
- Genus: Anomochone; Ijima, 1927

Species
- Anomochone expansa; Anomochone furcata; Anomochone globosa

Genus of sponges

Anomochone is a genus of glass sponges in the family Tretodictyidae.
