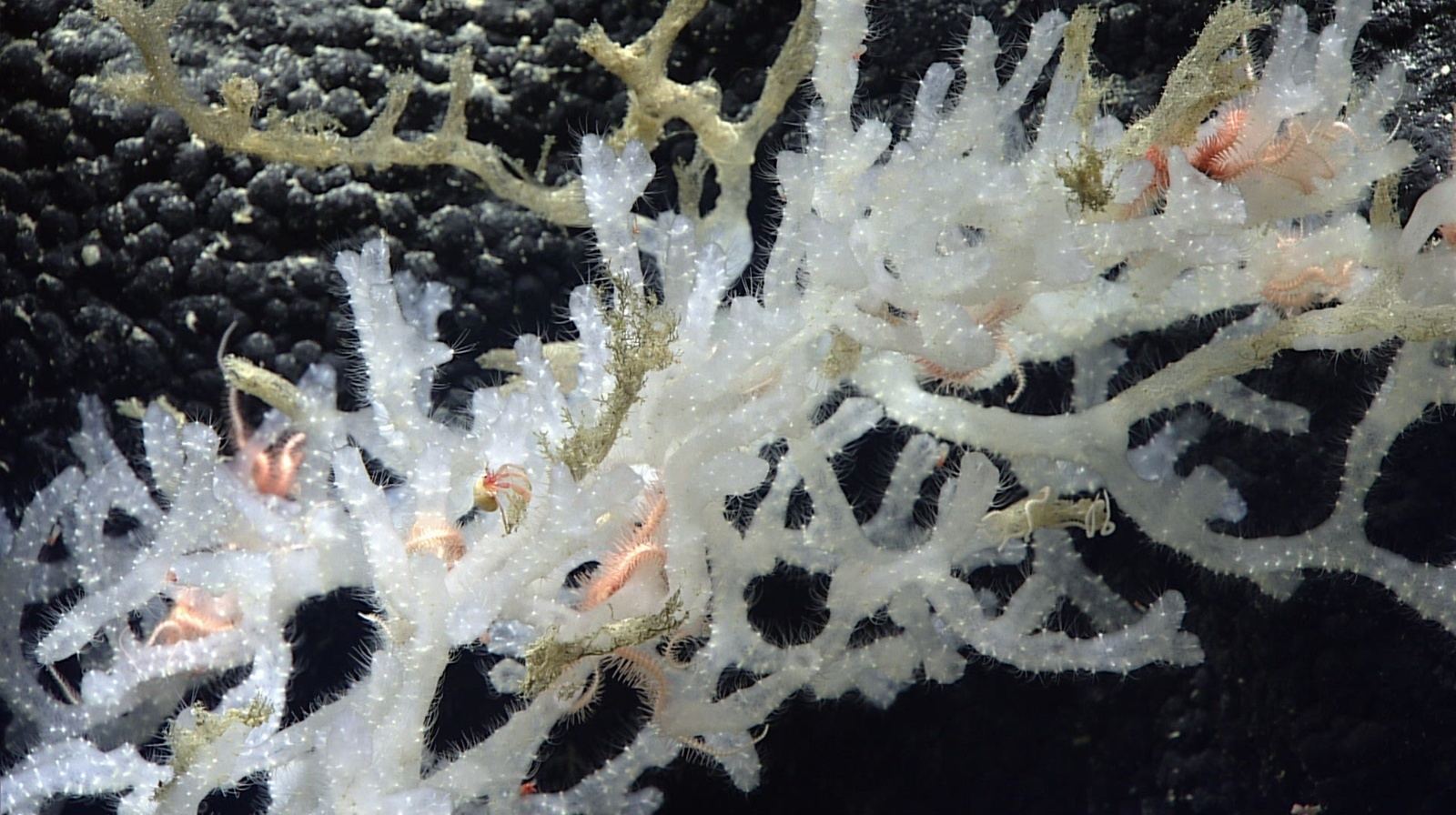
- Sclerothamnus specimen photographed by NOAA's Deep Discoverer ROV at Johnston atoll

Scientific classification
- Kingdom: Animalia
- Phylum: Porifera
- Class: Hexactinellida
- Order: Sceptrulophora
- Family: Tretodictyidae
- Genus: Sclerothamnus; Marshall, 1875

Species
- Sclerothamnus clausi

= Sclerothamnus =

Genus of sponges

Sclerothamnus is a genus of glass sponges in the family Tretodictyidae.
