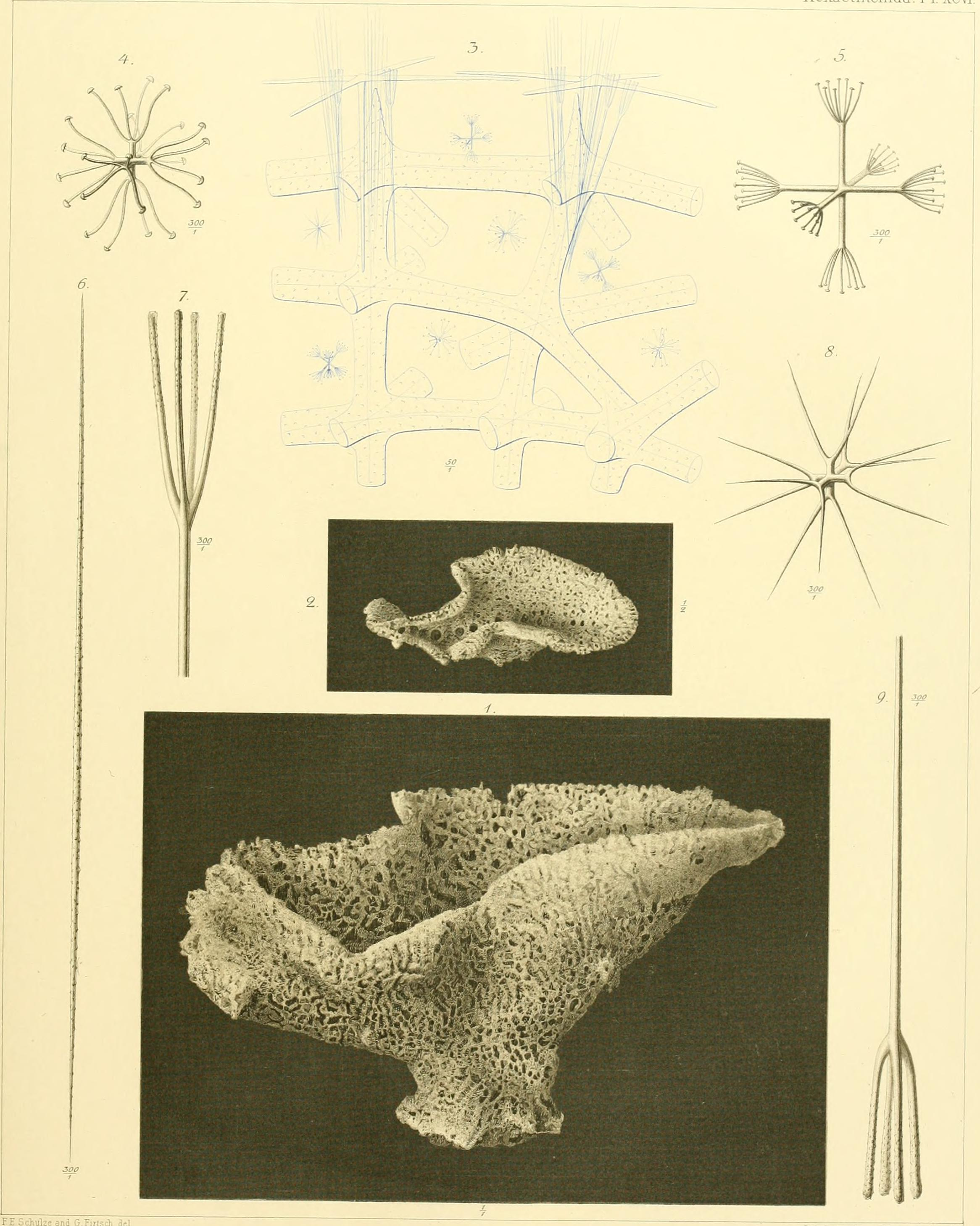
- Tretodictyum cyathus, plate XCVI from Report on the scientific results of the voyage of H.M.S. Challenger during the years 1873-76 - under the command of Captain George S. Nares, R.N., F.R.S. and Captain Frank Turle Thomson, R.N.

Scientific classification
- Kingdom: Animalia
- Phylum: Porifera
- Class: Hexactinellida
- Order: Sceptrulophora
- Family: Tretodictyidae; Schulze, 1877

Genera
- Anomochone; Hexactinella; Psilocalyx; Sclerothamnopsis; Sclerothamnus; Tretocalyx; Tretodictyum

= Tretodictyidae =

Family of hexactinellid sponges

Tretodictyidae is a family of glass sponges in the order Sceptrulophora.

== Genera ==
The family Tretodictyidae includes the following genera.

- Anomochone Ijima, 1927
- Hexactinella Carter, 1885
- Psilocalyx Ijima, 1927
- Sclerothamnopsis Wilson, 1904
- Sclerothamnus Marshall, 1875
- Tretocalyx Schulze, 1901
- Tretodictyum Schulze, 1886
