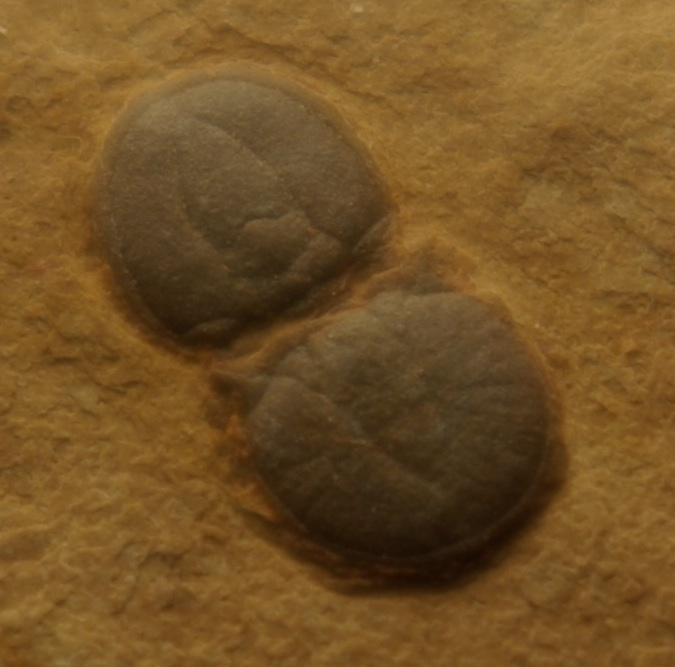
- Ptychagnostus germanus

Scientific classification
- Kingdom: Animalia
- Phylum: Arthropoda
- Clade: †Artiopoda
- Class: †Trilobita (?)
- Order: †Agnostida
- Family: †Ptychagnostidae
- Genus: †Ptychagnostus; Jaekel, 1909

Synonyms
- Triplagnostus Linnarsson, 1869; Huarpagnostus Rusconi, 1950; Solenagnostus Whitehouse, 1936; Pentagnostus Lermontova, 1940; Aristarius Opik, 1979; Aotagnostus Opik, 1979; Acidusus Opik, 1979; Canotagnostus Rusconi, 1951; Zeteagnostus Opik, 1979

= Ptychagnostus =

Ptychagnostus Temporal range: Middle Cambrian

Extinct genus of trilobites

Ptychagnostus is a genus of trilobites in the order Agnostida that lived during the Cambrian period. Their remains are rarely found in empty tubes of the polychaete worm Selkirkia. The genus probably ranged throughout the water column. It has two glabellar lobes, and three pygidial lobes.

== Type species ==
Agnostus punctuosus Angelin, 1851 from the Ptychagnostus punctuosus zone of the Alum Shale (Drumian), Sweden (by original designation). Official ruling on the conservation of accepted usage of A. punctuosus as the type species was given by the International Commission on Zoological Nomenclature, 1993.

== Remarks ==
Ptychagnostus affinis (Brøgger 1878) was once considered a subspecies of Ptychagnostus punctuosus.Laurie (2008) grouped punctuosus and affinis within Ptychagnostus, but preferred to place the closely related atavus within Acidusus.

== Species ==
- Ptychagnostus punctuosus (Type species).
- Ptychagnostus affinis (formerly Pt. punctuosus affinis)
- Ptychagnostus aculeatus
- Ptychagnostus akanthodes
- Ptychagnostus atavus
- Ptychagnostus cassis
- Ptychagnostus ciceroides
- Ptychagnostus cuyanus
- Ptychagnostus germanus
- Ptychagnostus gibbus
- Ptychagnostus hybridus
- Ptychagnostus intermedius
- Ptychagnostus michaeli
- Ptychagnostus praecurrens
- Ptychagnostus seminula
