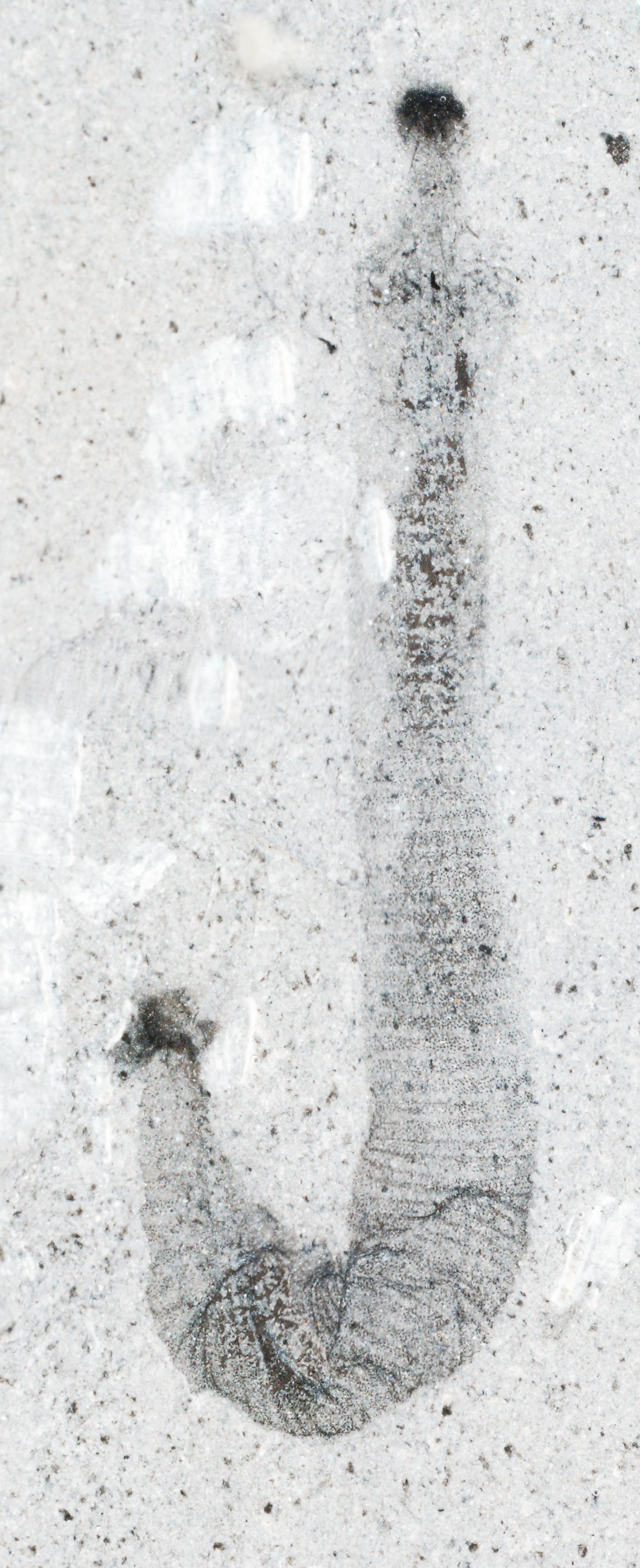
- Scathascolex minor. Image from Smith (2015)
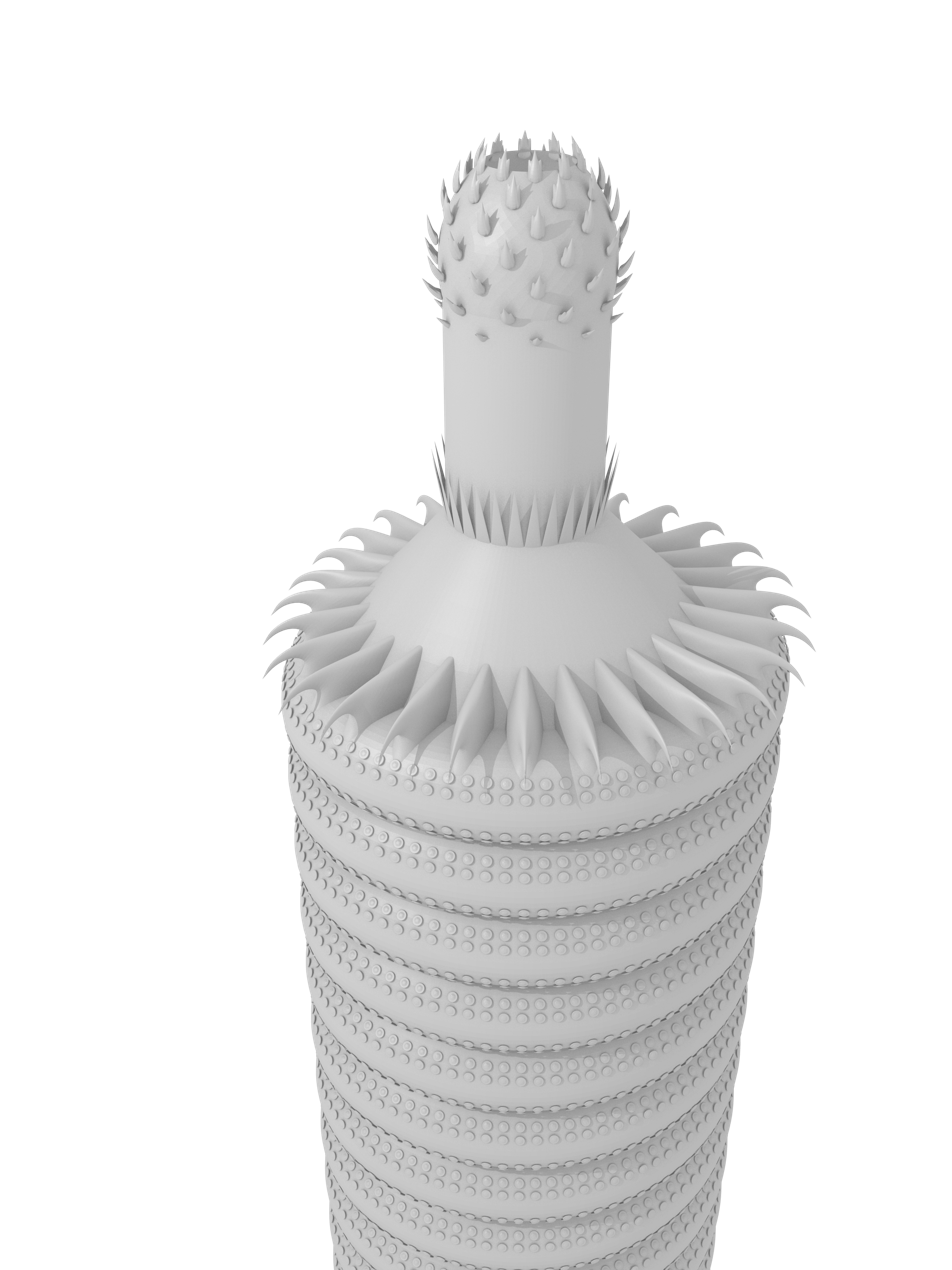
- 3D Reconstruction of anterior end.

Scientific classification
- Kingdom: Animalia
- Phylum: incertae sedis
- Class: †Palaeoscolecida
- Family: †Palaeoscolecidae
- Genus: †Scathascolex
- Species: †S. minor

Binomial name
- †Scathascolex minor Smith, 2015

= Scathascolex =

Scathascolex Temporal range: Burgess Shale

Extinct genus of worms

Scathascolex is a genus of palaeoscolecid worm known from the middle Cambrian Burgess Shale. It is the only taxon in that famous locality to exhibit the phosphatic plates that characterize palaeoscolecids, and has certain unusual characteristics – it does not have the multiple sizes of tessellating plates more typical of palaeoscolecids, and has more tail hooks than is the norm. Nevertheless, it is clearly a close relative of Palaeoscolex and Wronascolex.

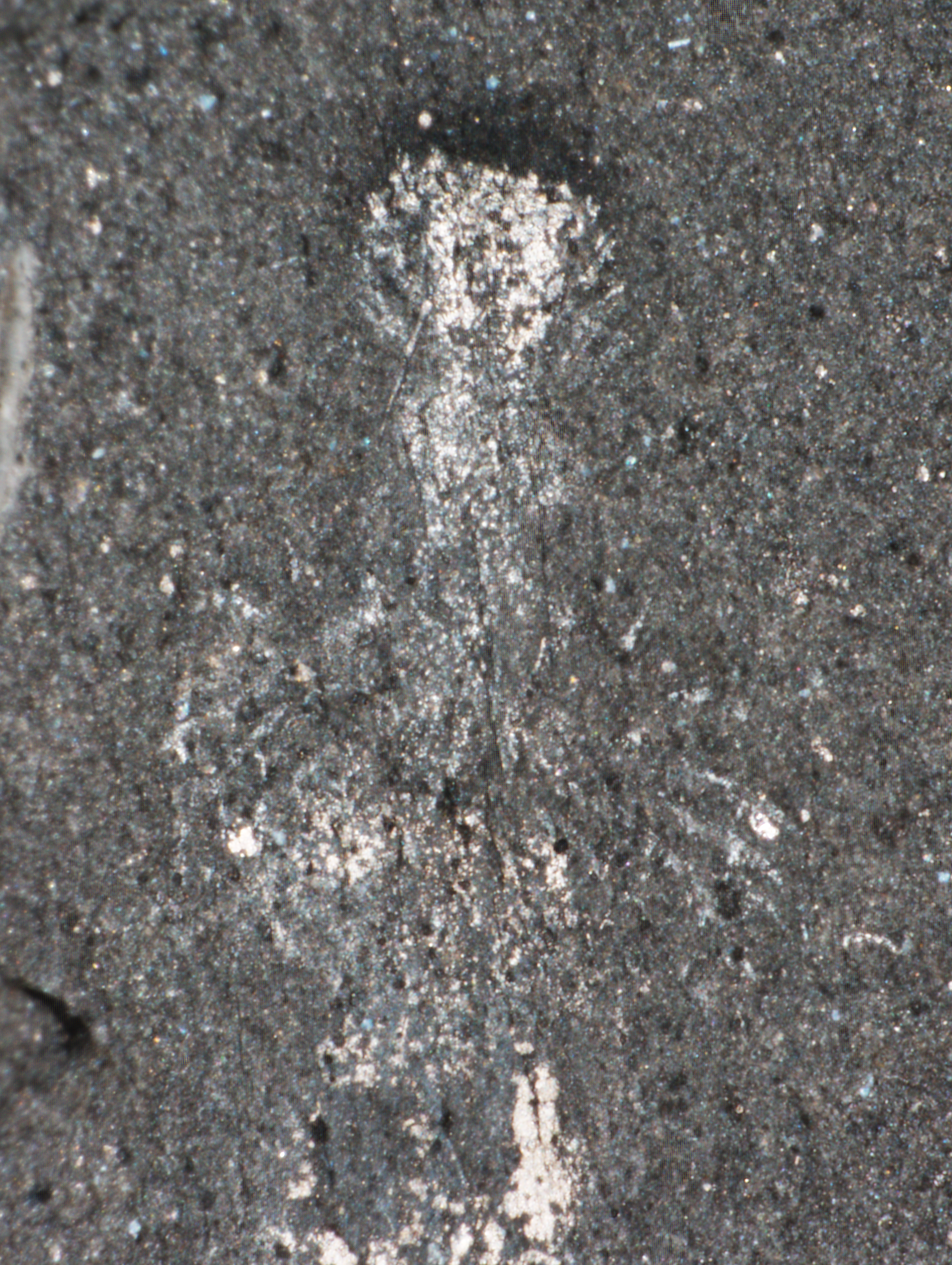
Pharyngeal region of Scathascolex minor, showing teeth and spines. From Smith (2015).

As with the co-occurring Burgess Shale worm Ancalagon, its name is derived from one of J. R. R. Tolkien's fictional dragons, in this case Scatha.
