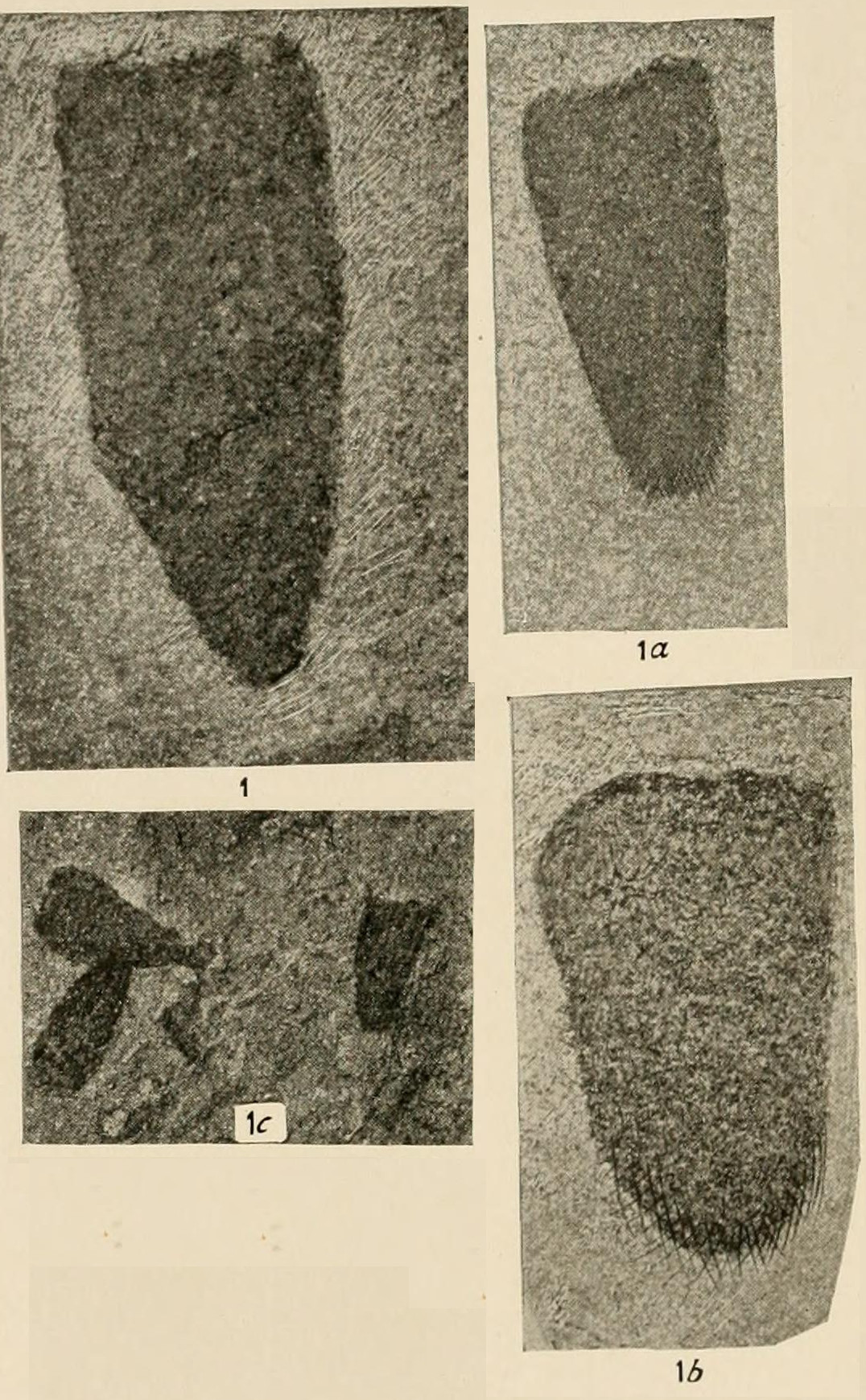
- Diagoniella hindei fossils

Scientific classification
- Kingdom: Animalia
- Phylum: Porifera
- Class: Hexactinellida
- Order: †Reticulosa
- Genus: †Diagoniella; Walcott, 1920

Species
- †Diagoniella cyathiformis; †Diagoniella hindei; †Diagoniella magna; †Diagoniella mica; †Diagoniella robisoni; †Diagoniella tubulara

= Diagoniella =

Diagoniella Temporal range: Burgess Shale

Extinct genus of sponges

Diagoniella is a genus of sponge known from the Middle Cambrian Burgess Shale. 128 specimens of Diagoniella are known from the Greater Phyllopod bed, where they comprise 0.24% of the community.

Several specimens previously assigned to Diagoniella by Rigby (1983) may have instead belonged to Polygoniella as per Del Mouro et al. (2024).
