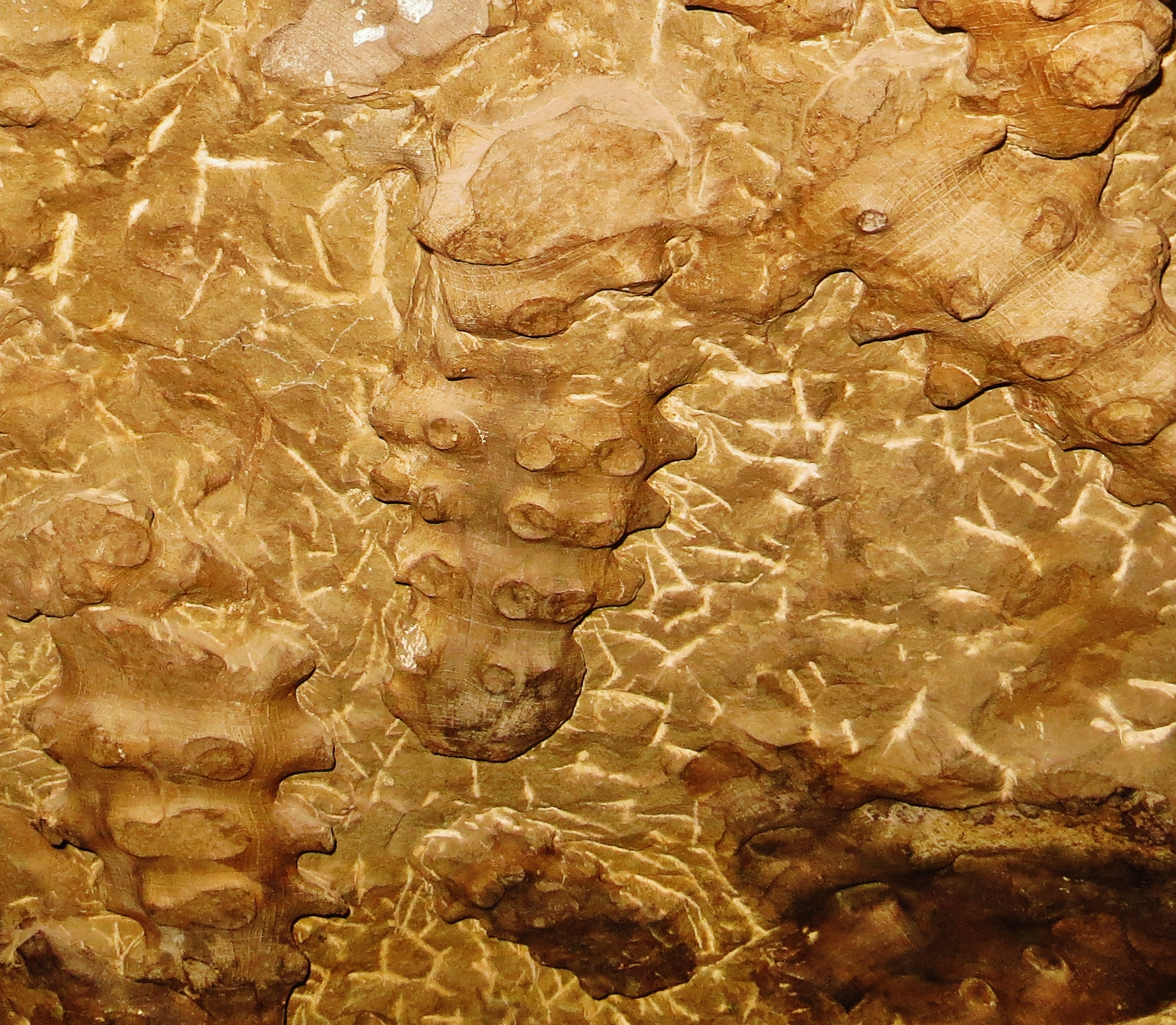
- Fossils of Hydnoceras, a large dictyospongiid from the Upper Devonian

Scientific classification
- Kingdom: Animalia
- Phylum: Porifera
- Class: Hexactinellida
- Subclass: Amphidiscophora
- Order: †Reticulosa; Reid, 1958

= Reticulosa =

Reticulosa Temporal range: Cambrian–Jurassic

Extinct order of sponges

Reticulosa is an extinct order of sea sponges in the class Hexactinellida (glass sponges) and the subclass Amphidiscophora. Reticulosans were diverse in shape and size, similar to their modern relatives, the amphidiscosidans. Some were smooth and attached to a surface at a flat point, others were polyhedral or ornamented with nodes, many were covered in bristles, and a few were even suspended above the seabed by a rope-like anchor of braided glass spicules.

Reticulosans comprise the vast majority of Paleozoic hexactinellid diversity, though only a few species survived up to the Mesozoic. They may include the oldest sponge body fossil in the world: Palaeophragmodictya, from the late Ediacaran (~555 Ma), was originally described as a reticulosan based on its mesh-like surface texture. Ediacaran-type preservation has obscured any information about spicule structure, and some authors doubt that Palaeophragmodictya is a sponge in the first place. Regardless, unambiguous reticulosans appear in the fossil record not much later, in the early Cambrian.

Like most other glass sponges, reticulosans had a skeleton of unfused macroscleres reinforced with microscopic microscleres. Their macroscleres are often stauractines (four-rayed spicules, + shaped), though pentactine (five-rayed) or hexactine (six-rayed) spicules may be predominant in certain regions of the skeleton. The outer layer of the skeleton forms a regular mesh-like pattern, with incrementally smaller spicules filling in the gaps between larger spicules in a fractal pattern. The microscleres, when present, are simple bundled rods (paraclavules).

The living glass sponge Sclerothamnus is sometimes compared to the reticulosan family Titusvillidae, though it is more commonly placed in the family Tretodictyidae of the order Sceptrulophora.

== Subgroups ==
From the Treatise on Invertebrate Paleontology (2004), unless otherwise noted:

- Superfamily †Dictyospongioidea Hall & Clarke, 1899
  - Family †Dictyospongiidae Hall & Clarke, 1899 [Ediacaran?–Middle Permian (Roadian)]
  - Family †Docodermatidae Finks, 1960 [Silurian (Ludlow)–Permian]
  - Family †Stereodictyidae Finks, 1960 [Carboniferous (Visean)–Upper Triassic (Carnian)]
- Superfamily †Dierespongioidea Rigby & Gutschick, 1976
  - Family †Aglithodictyidae Hall & Clarke, 1899 [Upper Devonian–Carboniferous (Visean)]
  - Family †Amphispongiidae Rauff, 1894 [upper Silurian]
  - Family †Dierespongiidae Rigby & Gutschick, 1976 [Middle Ordovician–Lower Permian (Artinskian)]
  - Family †Hydnodictyidae Rigby, 1971 [middle Cambrian–Upper Ordovician]
  - Family †Multivasculatidae Laubenfels, 1955 [upper Cambrian]
  - Family †Titusvillidae Caster, 1939 [Upper Devonian–Lower Mississippian, Holocene?]
- Superfamily †Hintzespongioidea Finks, 1983
  - Family †Hintzespongiidae Finks, 1983 [lower Cambrian–Middle Devonian (Givetian)]
  - Family †Teganiidae Laubenfels, 1955 [upper Cambrian (Furongian)–Upper Mississippian]
- Superfamily †Protospongioidea Hinde, 1887
  - Family †Asthenospongiidae? Botting, 2004 [Ordovician]
  - Family †Protospongiidae Hinde, 1887 [lower Cambrian–Jurassic]
  - Family †Triactinellidae? _{Botting, 2005} [Ordovician]
