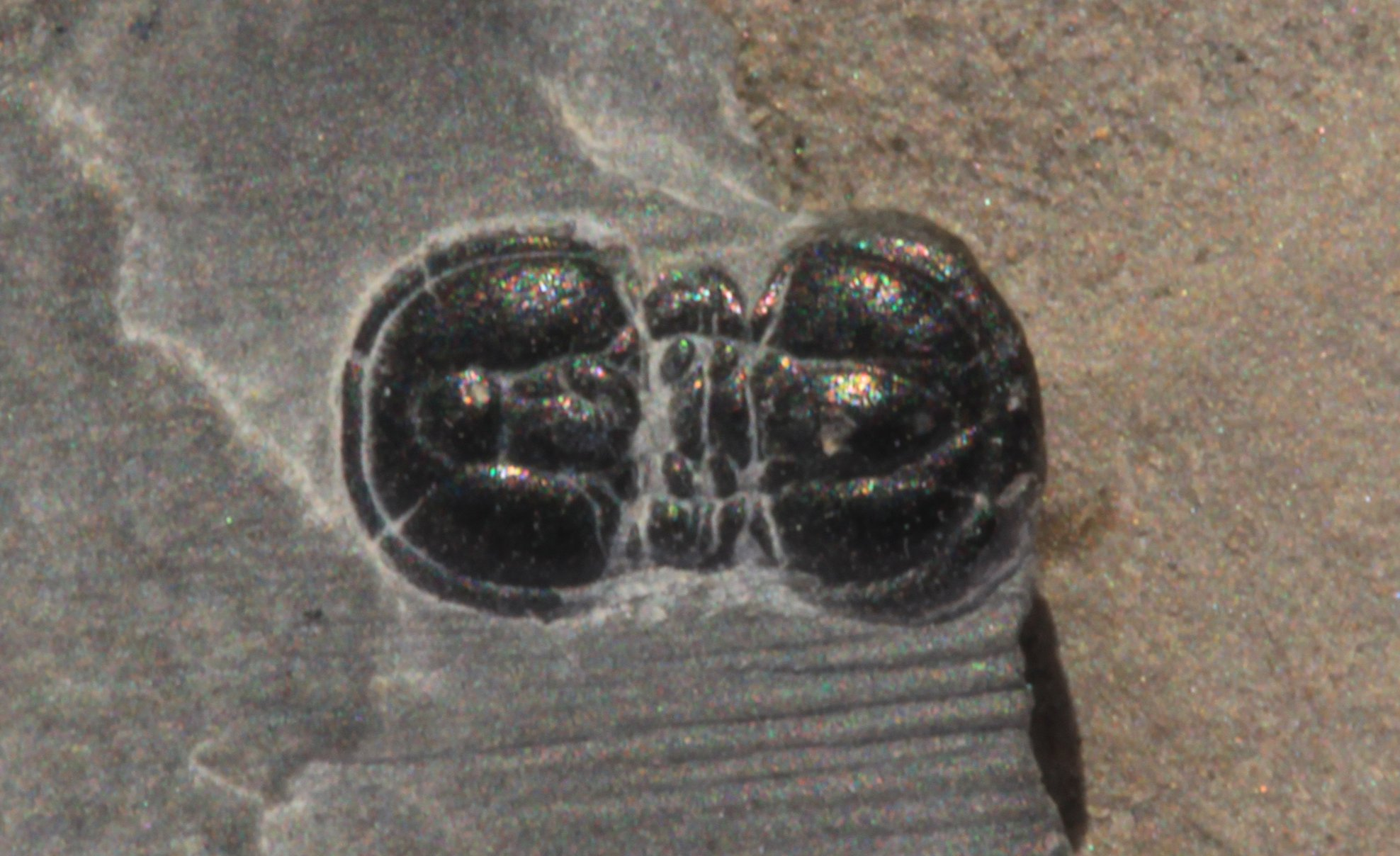
- Ptychagnostus gibbus
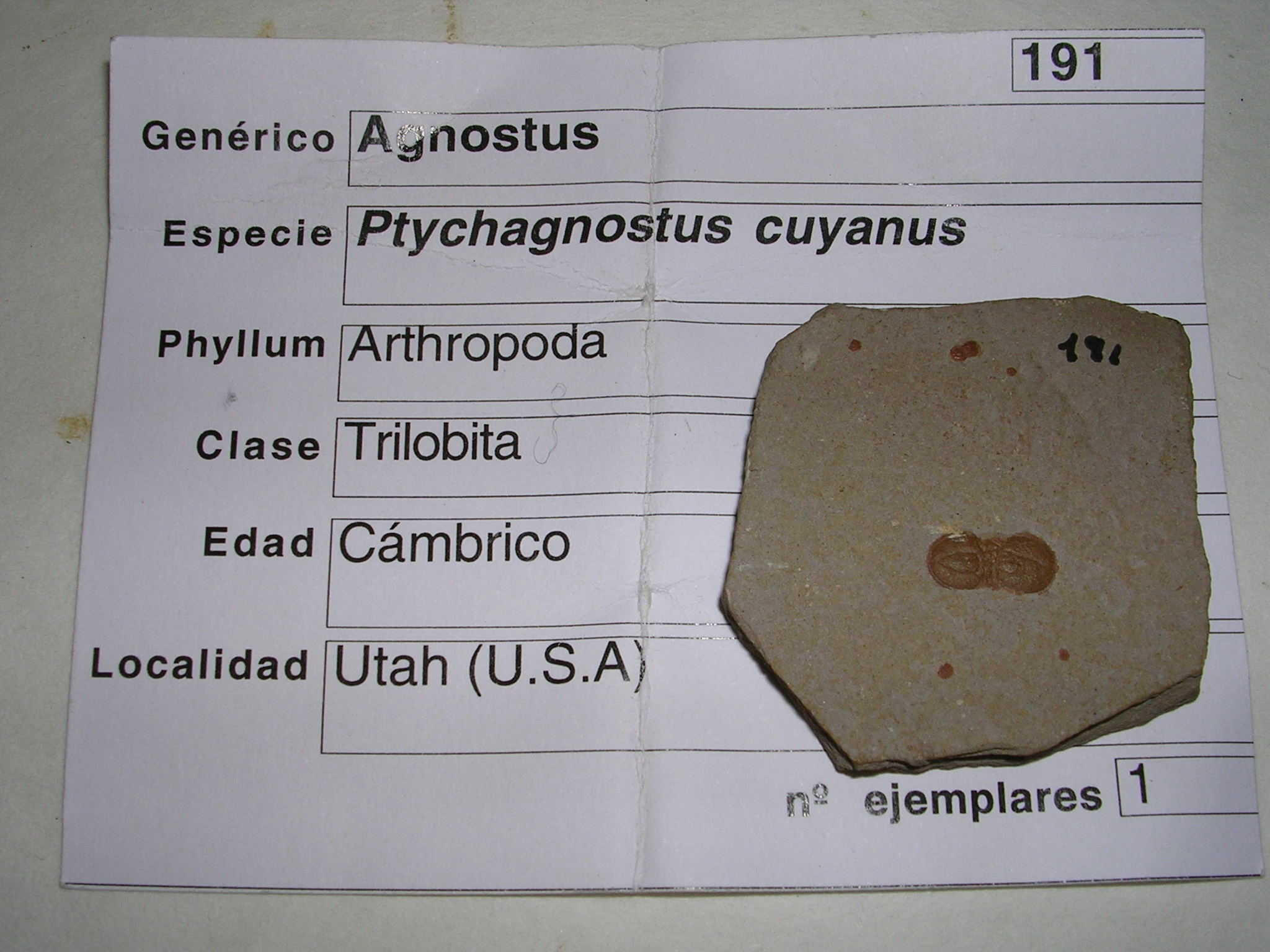
- Ptychagnostus cuyanus

Scientific classification
- Kingdom: Animalia
- Phylum: Arthropoda
- Clade: †Artiopoda
- Class: †Trilobita (?)
- Order: †Agnostida
- Suborder: †Agnostina
- Superfamily: †Agnostoidea
- Family: †Ptychagnostidae; Kobayashi, 1939

Type genus
- Ptychagnostus Jaekel, 1909

Genera
- See text

= Ptychagnostidae =

Ptychagnostidae Temporal range: Wuliuan - Paibian

Extinct family of trilobites

Ptychagnostidae is a family of agnostid trilobites from the 5th Stage to the Paibian Age of the Cambrian (506.5 to 497 million years ago). The family includes several important index fossils.

== Description ==
Like all agnostids, ptychagnostids have cephalons and pygidia that are more or less uniform in size and shape (isopygous). The thorax is composed of two body segments (somites). They are completely blind.

== Distribution and age range ==
Ptychagnostidae has a cosmopolitan distribution. They existed during the 5th Stage of the Series 3 Epoch to the Paibian Age of the early Furongian Epoch in the Cambrian (506.5 to 497 million years ago). The earliest member of the family is Ptychagnostus praecurrens from the Burgess Shale fauna.

== Taxonomy ==
Ptychagnostidae is classified under the superfamily Agnostoidea of the suborder Agnostina, order Agnostida. The family was first established by the Japanese paleontologist Teiichi Kobayashi in 1939. Its name comes from the type genus, Ptychagnostus. It includes the following genera (with their taxonomic synonyms):

- Allobodochus Opik, 1979
- Criotypus Opik, 1979
- Goniagnostus Howell, 1935
- Lejopyge Hawle & Corda, 1847

= Miagnostus

- Myrmecomimus Opik, 1979
- Onymagnostus Opik, 1979

= Agnostonymus

- Pseudophalacroma Pokrovskaya, 1958
- Ptychagnostus Jaekel, 1909

=Triplagnostus, Huarpagnostus, Solenagnostus, Pentagnostus, Aristarius, Aotagnostus, Acidusus, Canotagnostus, Zeteagnostus

- Schismagnostus Robison, 1994
- Tomagnostella Kobayashi, 1939a
- Tomagnostus Howell, 1935
- Yakutiana Özdikmen, 2009
