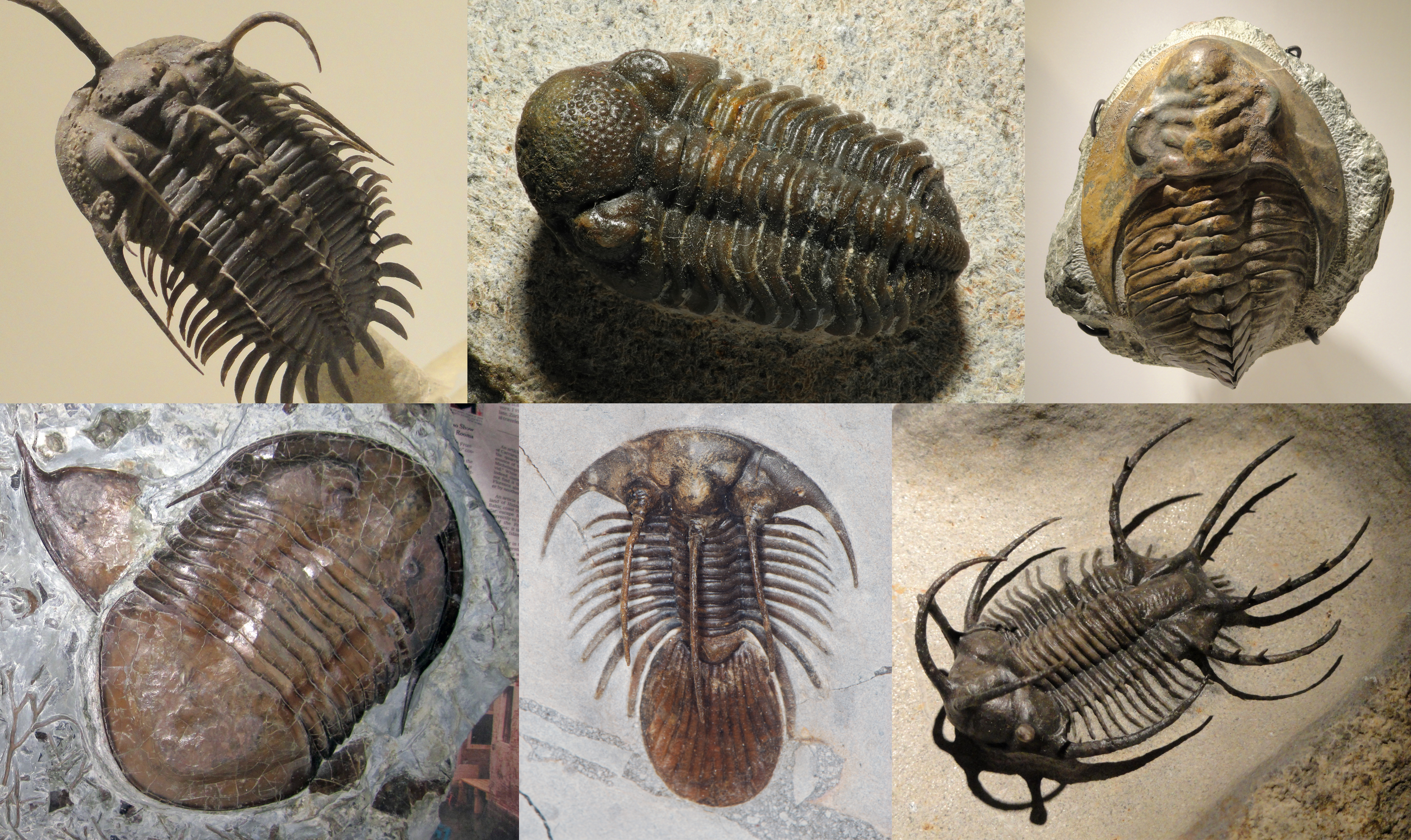
- Montage of trilobite genera: Top row: Walliserops, Phacops and Cambropallas; bottom row: Isotelus, Kolihapeltis and Ceratarges

Scientific classification
- Kingdom: Animalia
- Phylum: Arthropoda
- Clade: Deuteropoda
- Clade: †Artiopoda
- Subphylum: †Trilobitomorpha
- Class: †Trilobita; Walch, 1771

Orders
- Agnostida?; Asaphida; Corynexochida; Harpetida; Redlichiida; Lichida; Odontopleurida; Phacopida; Proetida; Ptychopariida; Trinucleida?; Olenida?

= Trilobite =

Trilobite Temporal range: Early Cambrian – Late Permian, 521–251.9 Ma

Class of extinct, Paleozoic arthropods

Trilobites (/ˈtraɪləˌbaɪts, ˈtrɪlə-/; meaning "three-lobed entities") are extinct marine arthropods that form the class Trilobita. One of the earliest groups of arthropods to appear in the fossil record, trilobites were among the most successful of all early animals, existing in oceans for almost 270 million years, with over 22,000 species having been described.

Because trilobites had wide diversity and an easily fossilized mineralised exoskeleton made of calcite, they left an extensive fossil record. The study of their fossils has facilitated important contributions to biostratigraphy, paleontology, evolutionary biology, and plate tectonics. Trilobites are placed within the clade Artiopoda, which includes many organisms that are morphologically similar to trilobites, but are largely unmineralised. The relationship of Artiopoda to other arthropods is uncertain.

Trilobites evolved into many ecological niches; some moved over the seabed as predators, scavengers, or filter feeders, and some swam, feeding on plankton. Some even crawled onto land. Most lifestyles expected of modern marine arthropods are seen in trilobites, with the possible exception of parasitism (where scientific debate continues). Some trilobites (particularly the family Olenidae) are even thought to have evolved a symbiotic relationship with sulfur-eating bacteria from which they derived food. The largest trilobites were more than 70 centimetres (28 in) long and may have weighed as much as 4.5 kilograms (9.9 lb).

The first appearance of trilobites in the fossil record defines the base of the Atdabanian/Cambrian Stage 3 time period of the Early Cambrian around 521 million years ago. Trilobites were already diverse and globally dispersed shortly after their origination, with trilobites reaching an apex of diversity during the late Cambrian–Ordovician, and remained diverse during the following Silurian and early Devonian. During the mid-late Devonian, their diversity strongly declined, being impacted by successive extinction events, including the Taghanic event, the Late Devonian mass extinction/Kellwasser event and the Hangenberg/end-Devonian mass extinction, wiping out most trilobite diversity and leaving Proetida as the only surviving order. Their diversity moderately recovered during the Early Carboniferous, before dropping to persistently low levels during the late Carboniferous and Permian periods, though they remained widespread until the end of their existence. The last trilobites disappeared in the end-Permian mass extinction event about 251.9 million years ago, by which time only a handful of species remained.

== Evolution ==
=== Trilobite relatives ===
Trilobites belong to the Artiopoda, a group of extinct arthropods morphologically similar to trilobites, though only the trilobites had heavily mineralised exoskeletons. Thus, other artiopodans are typically only found in exceptionally preserved deposits, mostly from the Cambrian period.

The exact relationships of artiopods to other arthropods is uncertain. Some scholars consider them closely related to chelicerates (which include horseshoe crabs, sea spiders, and arachnids) as part of a clade called Arachnomorpha, while others consider them to be more closely related to Mandibulata (which contains insects, crustaceans and myriapods) as part of a clade called Antennulata.

Cladogram of Artiopoda including trilobites after Berks et al. 2023.

- Artiopoda
  - - Thulaspis
    - Squamacula
  - - Protosutura
      - Zhiwenia
      - Australimicola
      - Acanthomeridion
    - - Vicissicaudata
        - Sidneyia
        - - Cheloniellida
          - - Emeraldella
            - - Kodymirus
              - - Eozetetes
                - Aglaspidida
      - Trilobitomorpha
        - - Retifacies
          - Pygmaclypeatus
        - - Xandarellida
          - - Nektaspida
            - - Conciliterga
              - - Kwanyinaspis
                - - Phytophilaspis
                  - Trilobita

==== Fossil record of early trilobites ====
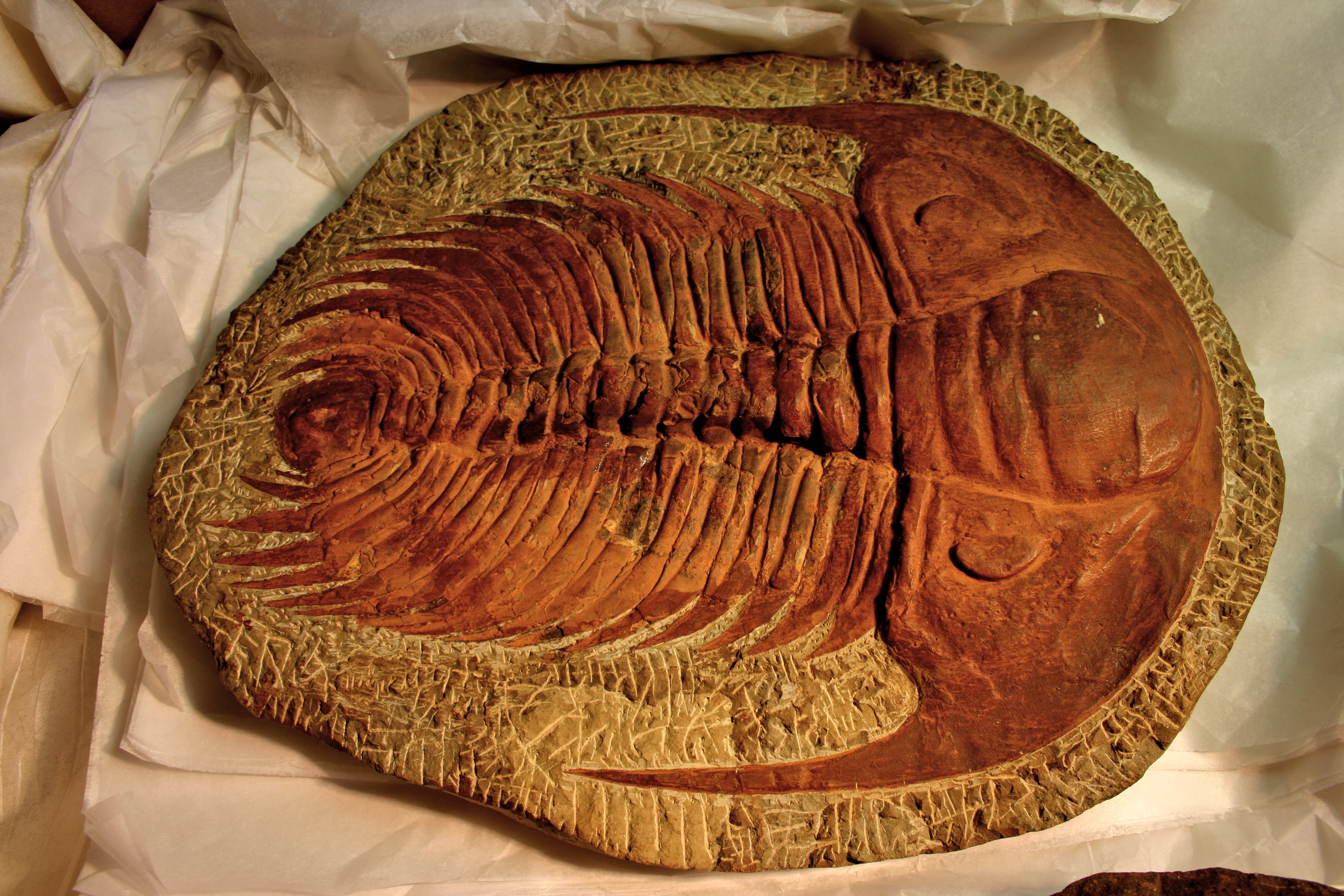
Redlichiida, such as this Paradoxides, may represent the ancestral trilobites.

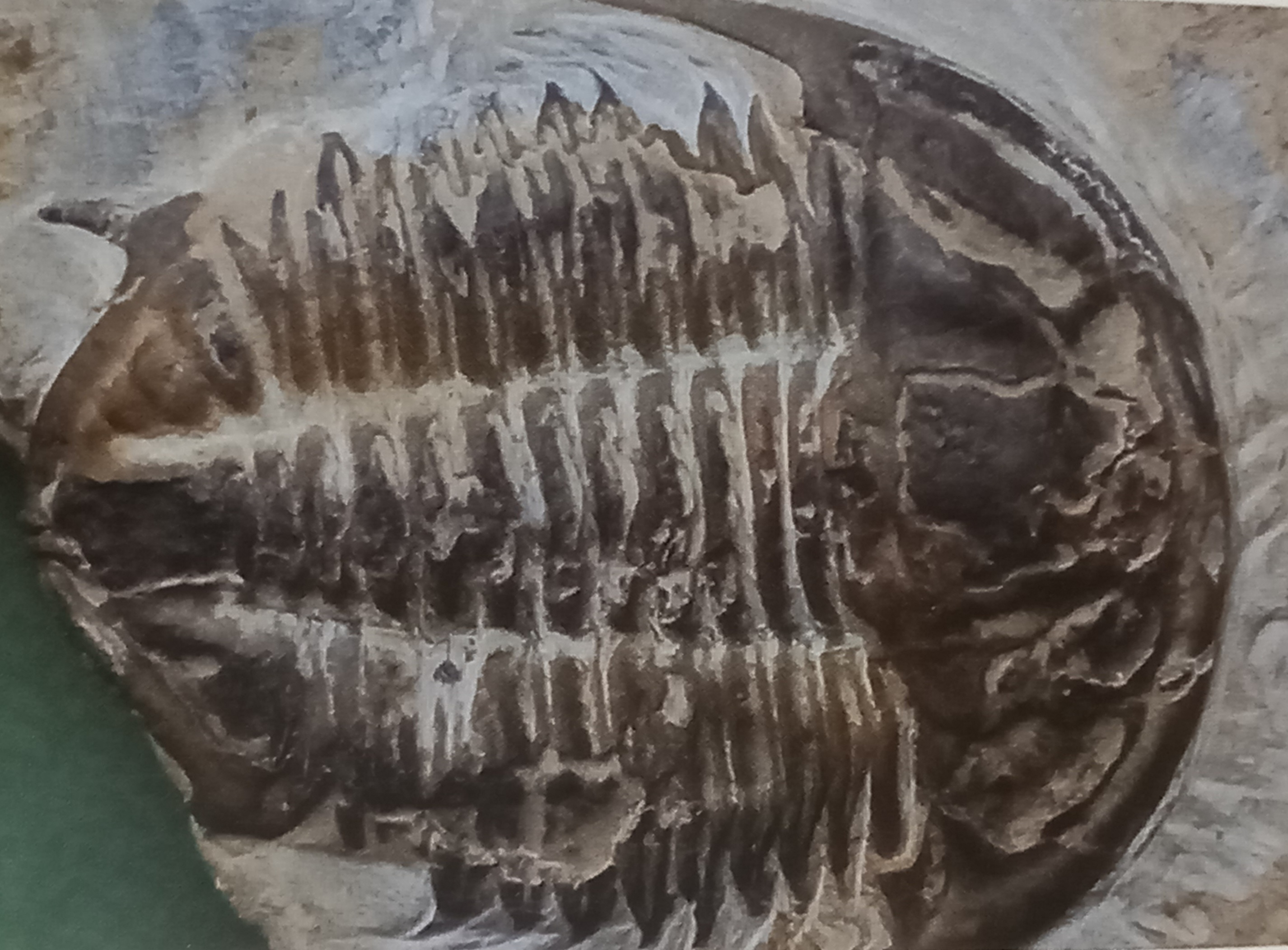
Fossil Prochuangia from the Cambrian period of Darnjal Formation, Tabas, Iran

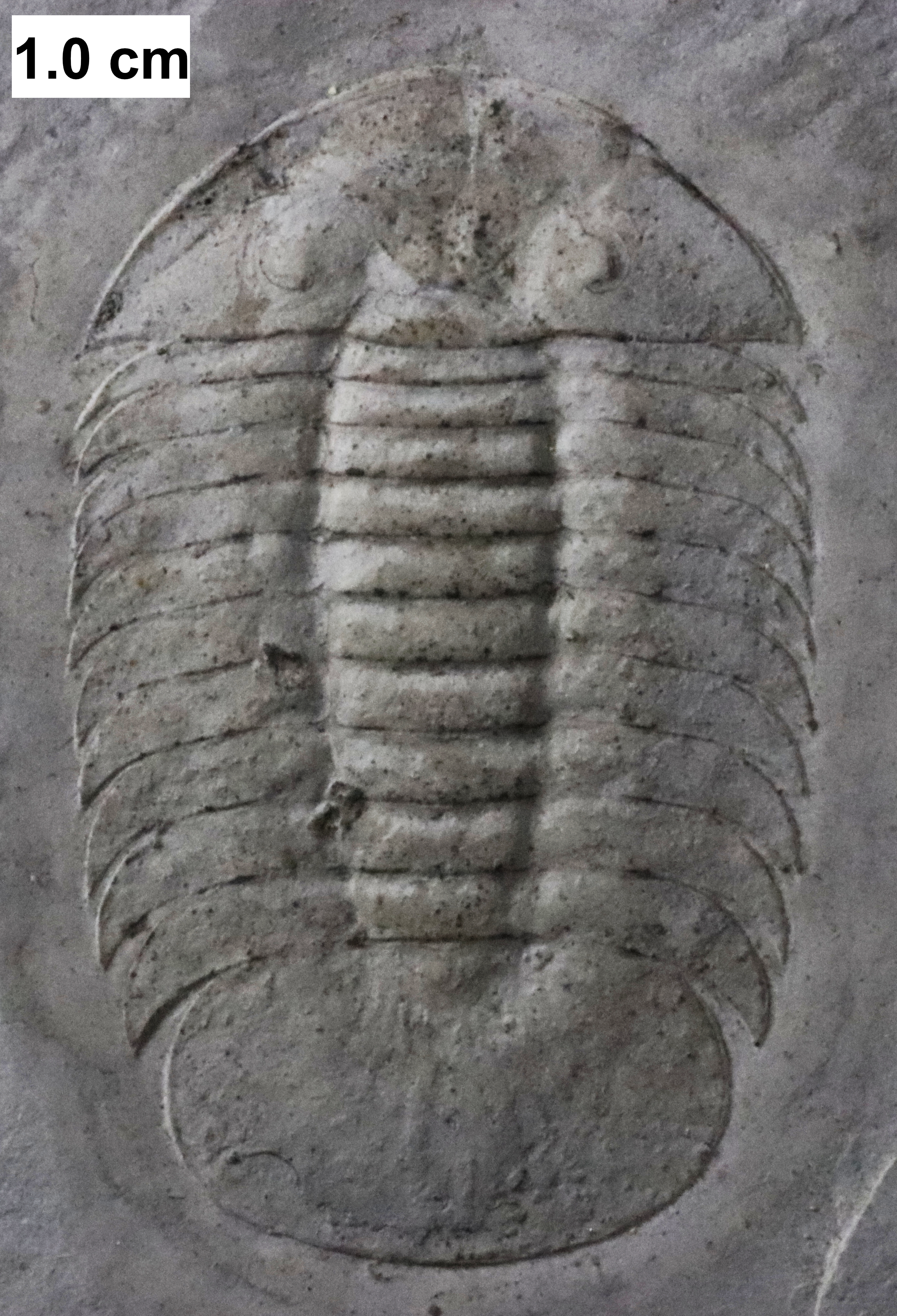
Meroperix, from the Silurian of Wisconsin

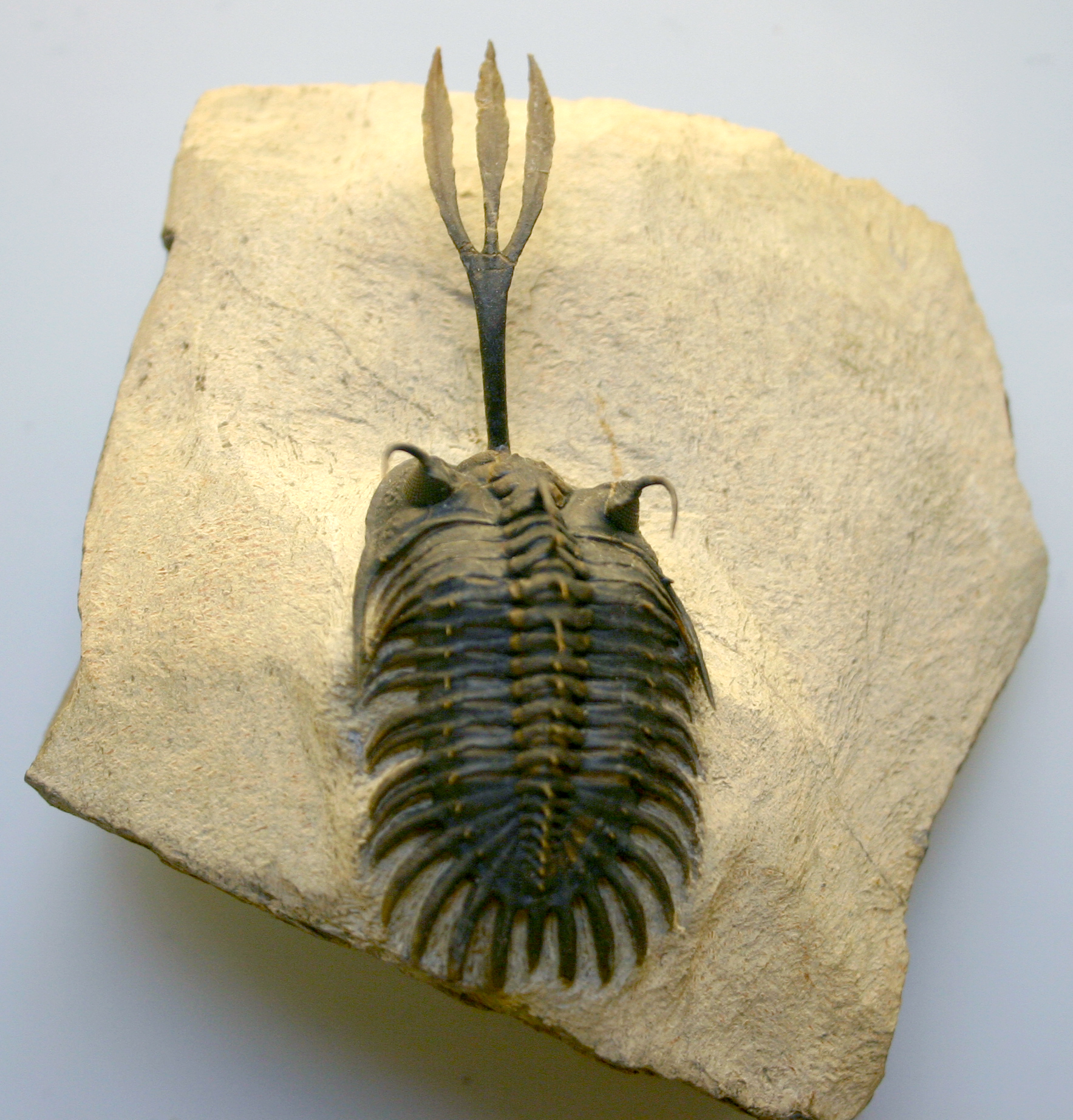
Walliserops trifurcatus, from Jebel Oufatene mountain near Fezzou, Morocco

The earliest trilobites known from the fossil record are redlichiids and ptychopariid bigotinids dated to around 520 million years ago. Contenders for the earliest trilobites include Profallotaspis jakutensis (Siberia), Fritzaspis spp. (western US), Hupetina antiqua (Morocco) and Serrania gordaensis (Spain). Trilobites appeared at a roughly equivalent time in Laurentia, Siberia and West Gondwana.

All Olenellina lack facial sutures (see below), and this is thought to represent the original state. The earliest sutured trilobite found so far (Lemdadella), occurs almost at the same time as the earliest Olenellina, suggesting the trilobites origin lies before the start of the Atdabanian, but without leaving fossils. Other groups show secondary lost facial sutures, such as all Agnostina and some Phacopina. Another common feature of the Olenellina also suggests this suborder to be the ancestral trilobite stock: early protaspid stages have not been found, supposedly because these were not calcified, and this also is supposed to represent the original state. Earlier trilobites may be found and could shed more light on their origins.

Three specimens of a trilobite from Morocco, Megistaspis hammondi, dated 478 million years old contain fossilized soft parts. In 2024, researchers discovered soft tissues and other structures including the labrum in well-preserved trilobite specimens from Cambrian Stage 4 of Morocco, providing new anatomical information regarding the external and internal morphology of trilobites, and the cause of such extraordinary preservation is probably due to their rapid death after an underwater pyroclastic flow.

=== Divergence and extinction ===
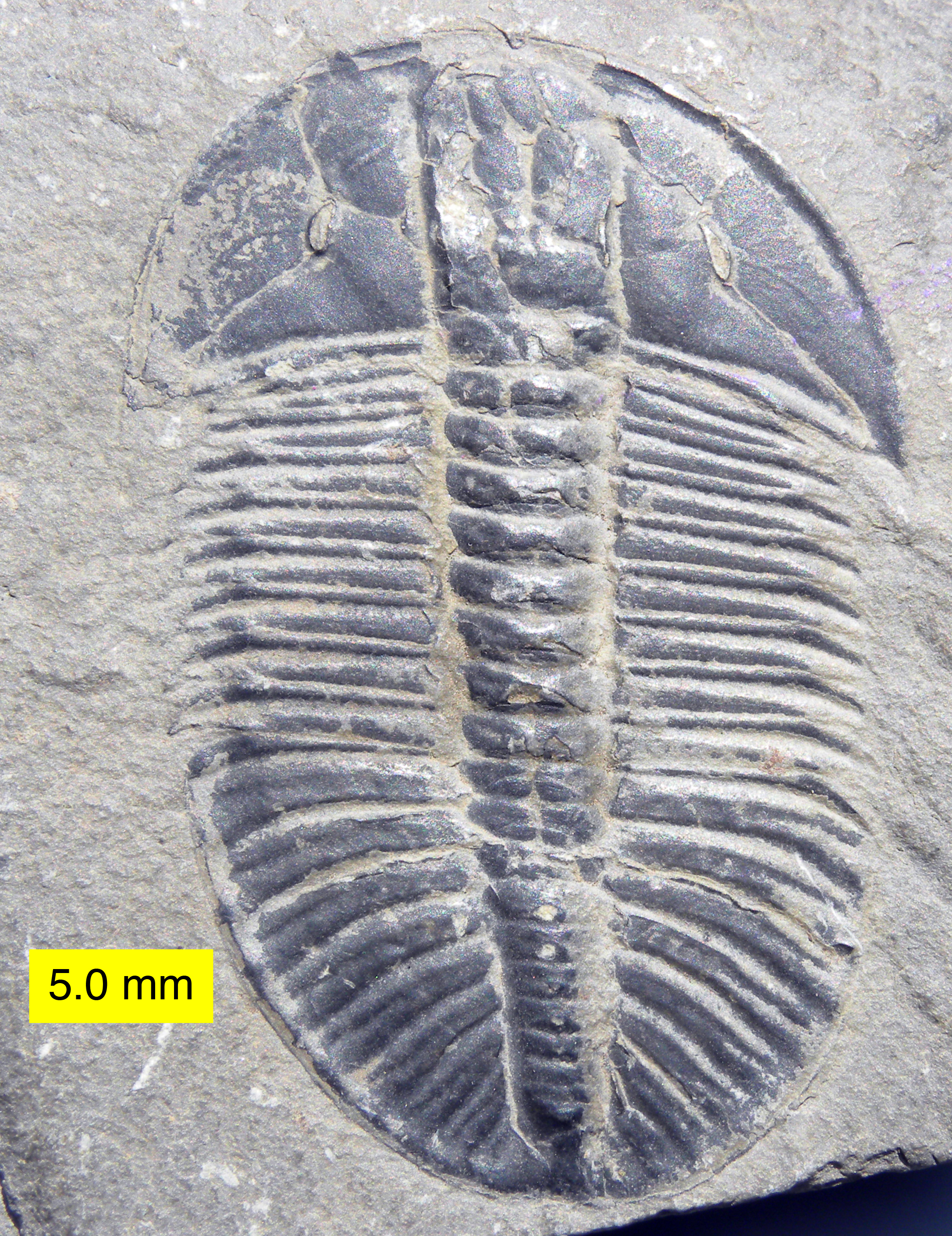
Ogygopsis klotzi from the Mt. Stephen Trilobite Beds (Middle Cambrian) near Field, British Columbia, Canada

Trilobites saw great diversification over time. For such a long-lasting group of animals, it is no surprise that trilobite evolutionary history is marked by a number of extinction events where some groups perished, and surviving groups diversified to fill ecological niches with comparable or unique adaptations. Generally, trilobites maintained high diversity levels throughout the Cambrian and Ordovician periods before entering a drawn-out decline in the Devonian, culminating in the final extinction of the last few survivors at the end of the Permian period.

==== Evolutionary trends ====
Principal evolutionary trends from primitive morphologies, such as exemplified by Eoredlichia, include the origin of new types of eyes, improvement of enrollment and articulation mechanisms, increased size of pygidium (micropygy to isopygy), and development of extreme spinosity in certain groups. Changes also included narrowing of the thorax and increasing or decreasing numbers of thoracic segments. Specific changes to the cephalon are also noted; variable glabella size and shape, position of eyes and facial sutures, and hypostome specialization. Several morphologies appeared independently within different major taxa (e.g. eye reduction or miniaturization).

Effacement, the loss of surface detail in the cephalon, pygidium, or the thoracic furrows, is also a common evolutionary trend. Notable examples of this were the orders Agnostida and Asaphida, and the suborder Illaenina of the Corynexochida. Effacement is believed to be an indication of either a burrowing lifestyle or a pelagic one. Effacement poses a problem for taxonomists since the loss of details (particularly of the glabella) can make the determination of phylogenetic relationships difficult.

==== Cambrian ====
Although it has historically been suggested that trilobites originated during the Precambrian this is no longer supported, and it is thought that trilobites originated shortly before they appeared in the fossil record. Very shortly after trilobite fossils appeared in the lower Cambrian, they rapidly diversified into the major orders that typified the Cambrian—Redlichiida, Ptychopariida, Agnostida, and Corynexochida. The first major crisis in the trilobite fossil record occurred in the Middle Cambrian; surviving orders developed isopygius or macropygius bodies and developed thicker cuticles, allowing better defense against predators (see Thorax below). The Late Cambrian marks the beginning of the apex of trilobite diversity. The end-Cambrian mass extinction event marked a major change in trilobite fauna; almost all Redlichiida (including the Olenelloidea) and most Late Cambrian stocks became extinct. A continuing decrease in Laurentian continental shelf area is recorded at the same time as the extinctions, suggesting major environmental upheaval.

Notable trilobite genera appearing in the Cambrian include:

- Abadiella (Lower Cambrian)
- Buenellus (Lower Cambrian)
- Judomia (Lower Cambrian)
- Olenellus (Lower Cambrian)
- Ellipsocephalus (Middle Cambrian)
- Elrathia (Middle Cambrian)
- Paradoxides (Middle Cambrian)
- Peronopsis (Middle Cambrian)
- Xiuqiella (Middle Cambrian)
- Yiliangella (Middle Cambrian)
- Yiliangellina (Middle Cambrian)
- Olenus (Late Cambrian)

==== Ordovician ====
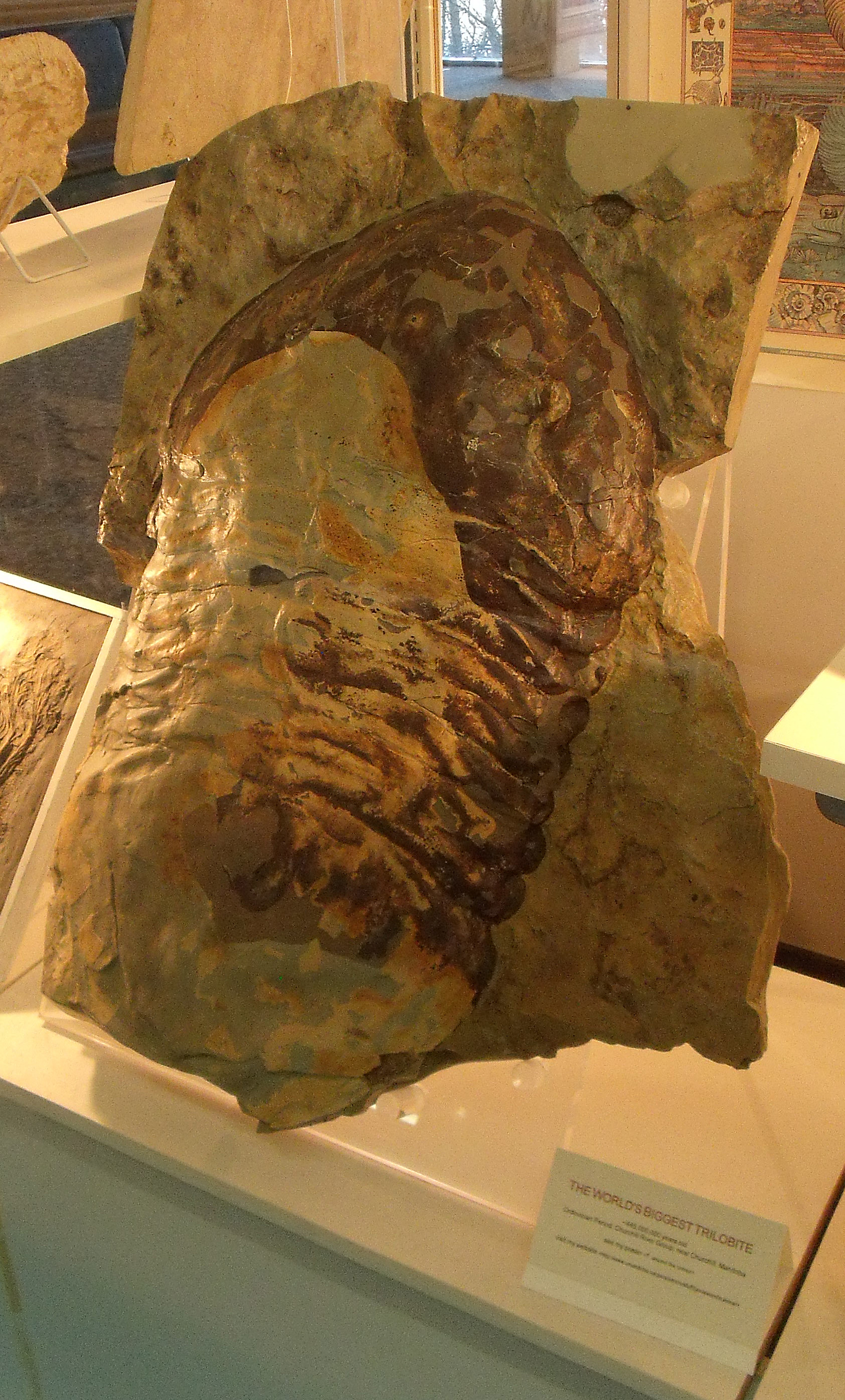
Cast of Isotelus rex, the largest-known trilobite, from the middle to upper Ordovician of North America

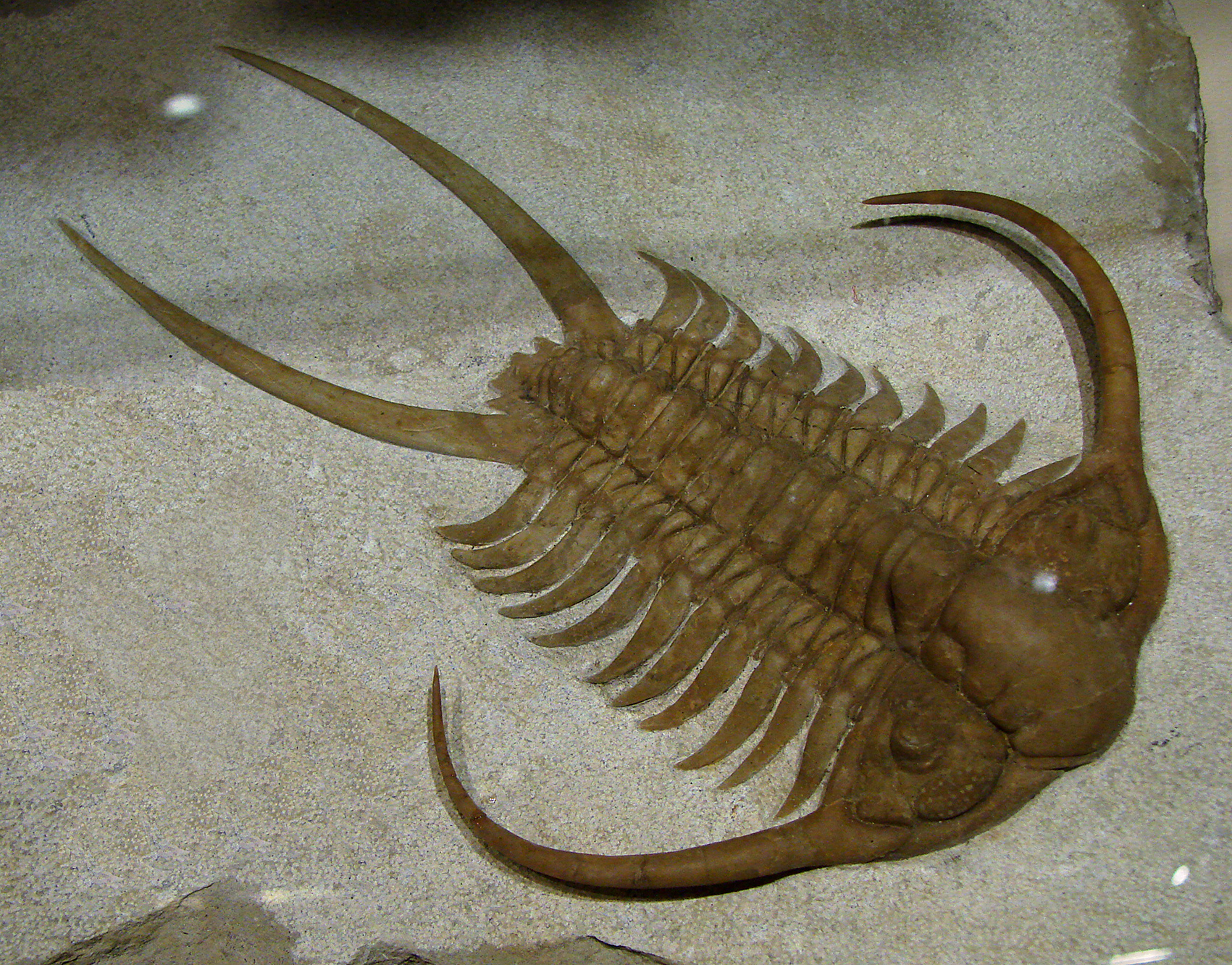
Cheirurus sp., middle Ordovician age, Volkhov River, Russia

The Early Ordovician is marked by vigorous radiations of articulate brachiopods, bryozoans, bivalves, echinoderms, and graptolites, with many groups appearing in the fossil record for the first time. Although intra-species trilobite diversity seems to have peaked during the Cambrian, trilobites were still active participants in the Ordovician radiation event, with a new fauna taking over from the old Cambrian one. Phacopida and Trinucleioidea are characteristic forms, highly differentiated and diverse, most with uncertain ancestors. The Phacopida and other "new" clades almost certainly had Cambrian forebears, but the fact that they have avoided detection is a strong indication that novel morphologies were developing very rapidly. Changes within the trilobite fauna during the Ordovician foreshadowed the mass extinction at the end of the Ordovician, allowing many families to continue into the Silurian with little disturbance. Ordovician trilobites were successful at exploiting new environments, notably reefs. The Ordovician mass extinction did not leave the trilobites unscathed; some distinctive and previously successful forms such as the Telephinidae and Agnostida became extinct. The Ordovician marks the last great diversification period amongst the trilobites: very few entirely new patterns of organisation arose post-Ordovician. Later evolution in trilobites was largely a matter of variations upon the Ordovician themes. By the Ordovician mass extinction, vigorous trilobite radiation has stopped, and gradual decline is foreshadowed. The Ordovician marks the apex of trilobite morphological and species diversity.

Some of the genera of Trilobites appearing in the Ordovician include:

- Cyclopyge (Early to Late Ordovician)
- Selenopeltis (Early to Late Ordovician)
- Parabolina (Early Ordovician)
- Cheirurus (Middle Ordovician)
- Eodalmanitina (Middle Ordovician)
- Trinucleus (Middle Ordovician)
- Triarthrus (Late Ordovician)

==== Silurian and Devonian ====
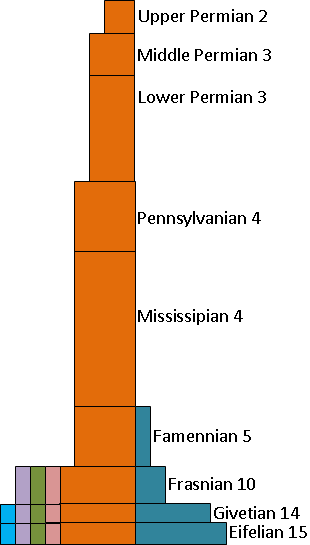
Number of families, Middle Devonian to Upper Permian. Proetida – brown, Phacopida – steel blue, Lichida – clear blue, Harpetida – pink, Odontopleurida – olive and Corynexochida – purple

Most Early Silurian families constitute a subgroup of the Late Ordovician fauna. Few, if any, of the dominant Early Ordovician fauna survived to the end of the Ordovician, yet 74% of the dominant Late Ordovician trilobite fauna survived the Ordovician. Late Ordovician survivors account for all post-Ordovician trilobite groups except the Harpetida. Silurian and Devonian trilobite assemblages are superficially similar to Ordovician assemblages, dominated by Lichida and Phacopida (including the well-known Calymenina). The Silurian diversity of trilobites was high during the Llandovery and Wenlock, though there was a sharp drop during the Pridoli at the end of the period, followed by a diversification during the Early Devonian, reaching a high point of 180 trilobite genera during the Emsian stage.

The Middle-Late Devonian was a decisive turning point in trilobite history, with the Taghanic event during the Givetian sharply decreasing trilobite diversity, particularly in shallow water environments, which was followed by the Late Devonian mass extinction/Kellwasser event (involving a combination of sea level change and marine anoxia) at the Frasnian–Famennian boundary, widely regarded as one of the most significant mass extinction events in Earth's history, decimating the group's diversity including the extinction of the orders Corynexochida, Harpetida and Odontopleurida, with the low trilobite diversity in its aftermath in the Famennian, consisting only of the orders Phacopida and Proetida, being again strongly impacted by the Hangenberg event (also called the end-Devonian mass extinction) at the end of the Devonian, with both shallow water and deep water trilobites being affected. Only a single order, the Proetida, survived into the Carboniferous.

Genera of trilobites during the Silurian and Devonian periods include:

- Dalmanites (Early to Late Silurian)
- Calymene (Silurian)
- Encrinurus (Silurian)
- Exallaspis (Middle to Late Silurian)
- Paralejurus (Early Devonian)
- Lioharpes (Early-Middle Devonian)
- Phacops (Middle to Late Devonian)

==== Carboniferous and Permian ====
The Proetida, the only trilobite order to survive the end of the Devonian, continued through the Carboniferous period and lasted until the end of the Permian (when the vast majority of species on Earth were wiped out). Proetids are generally morphologically homogeneous (similar to each other), having a generally conservative bodyform, and were probably all predators or scavengers. Trilobites rapidly diversified during the earliest Carboniferous (Tournasian), reaching diversity levels unseen since prior to the Taghanic event, though most of this diversification was of the family Phillipsiidae, with other trilobite families barely rebounding. During the Serpukhovian at the end of the Early Carboniferous, trilobite diversity again strongly declined, and trilobite diversity remained stagnantly low throughout the late Carboniferous. Trilobite diversity may have been affected by ecological changes during the Carboniferous, such as the rise of durophagous fish with crushing mouthparts.

By the end of the Carboniferous, the diversity of trilobites had dropped to only 1.8–2.2% (around 7 genera) of the peak diversity it had had during the early Paleozoic, with this low diversity continuing into the Permian. During the Permian period, while trilobites were widespread and occurred in a variety of environments, they were typically rare components of local faunas, in sharp contrast to their often great abundance earlier in the Paleozoic. Permian trilobite diversity reached a peak during the Guadalupian with diversity sharply dropping by the beginning of the following Lopingian.

Some of the genera of trilobites during the Carboniferous and Permian periods include:

- Archegonus (Early to Middle Carboniferous)
- Hesslerides (Middle Carboniferous)
- Endops (Middle Permian)
- Triproetus (Late Carboniferous to Early Permian)
- Ditomopyge (Late Carboniferous to Late Permian)
- Pseudophillipsia (Late Carboniferous to Late Permian)

==== Final extinction ====
At the end of the Permian (Changhsingian), only two genera of trilobites remained extant, Acropyge and Pseudophillipsia. Late Permian trilobites primarily occurred in shallow marine carbonate platform environments, but were also found in deep water, and were widespread, ranging towards the poles.

Exactly why the trilobites became extinct is not clear; with repeated extinction events (often followed by apparent recovery) throughout the trilobite fossil record, a combination of causes is likely. After the extinction event at the end of the Devonian period, what trilobite diversity remained was bottlenecked into the order Proetida. Decreasing diversity of genera limited to shallow-water shelf habitats coupled with a drastic lowering of sea level (regression) meant that the final decline of trilobites happened shortly before the end Permian mass extinction event. With so many marine species involved in the Permian extinction, the end of nearly 300 million successful years for the trilobites would not have been unexpected at the time.

== Fossil distribution ==
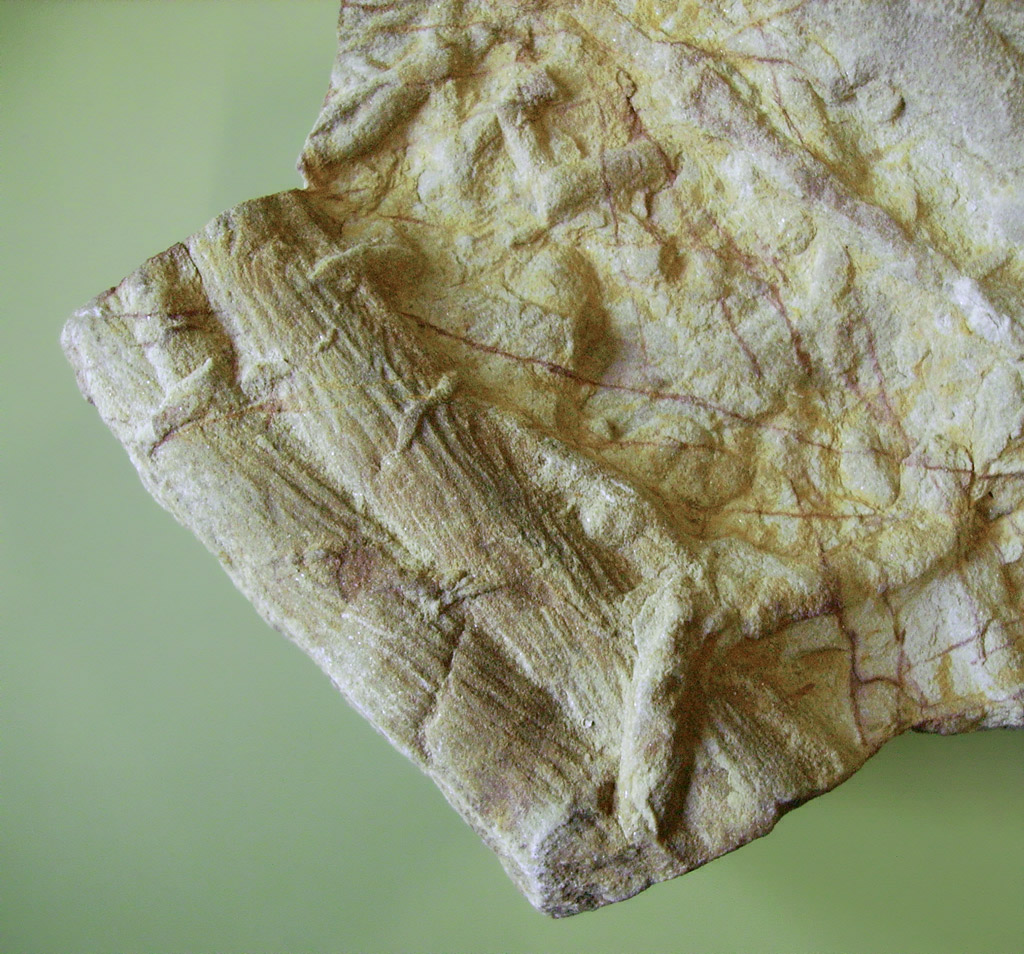
Cruziana, fossil trilobite-burrowing trace

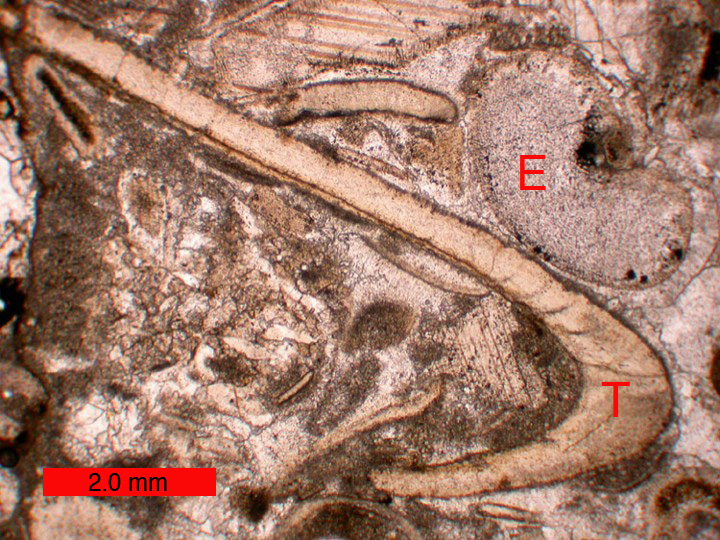
A trilobite fragment (T) in a thin-section of an Ordovician limestone; E=echinoderm; scale bar is 2 mm.

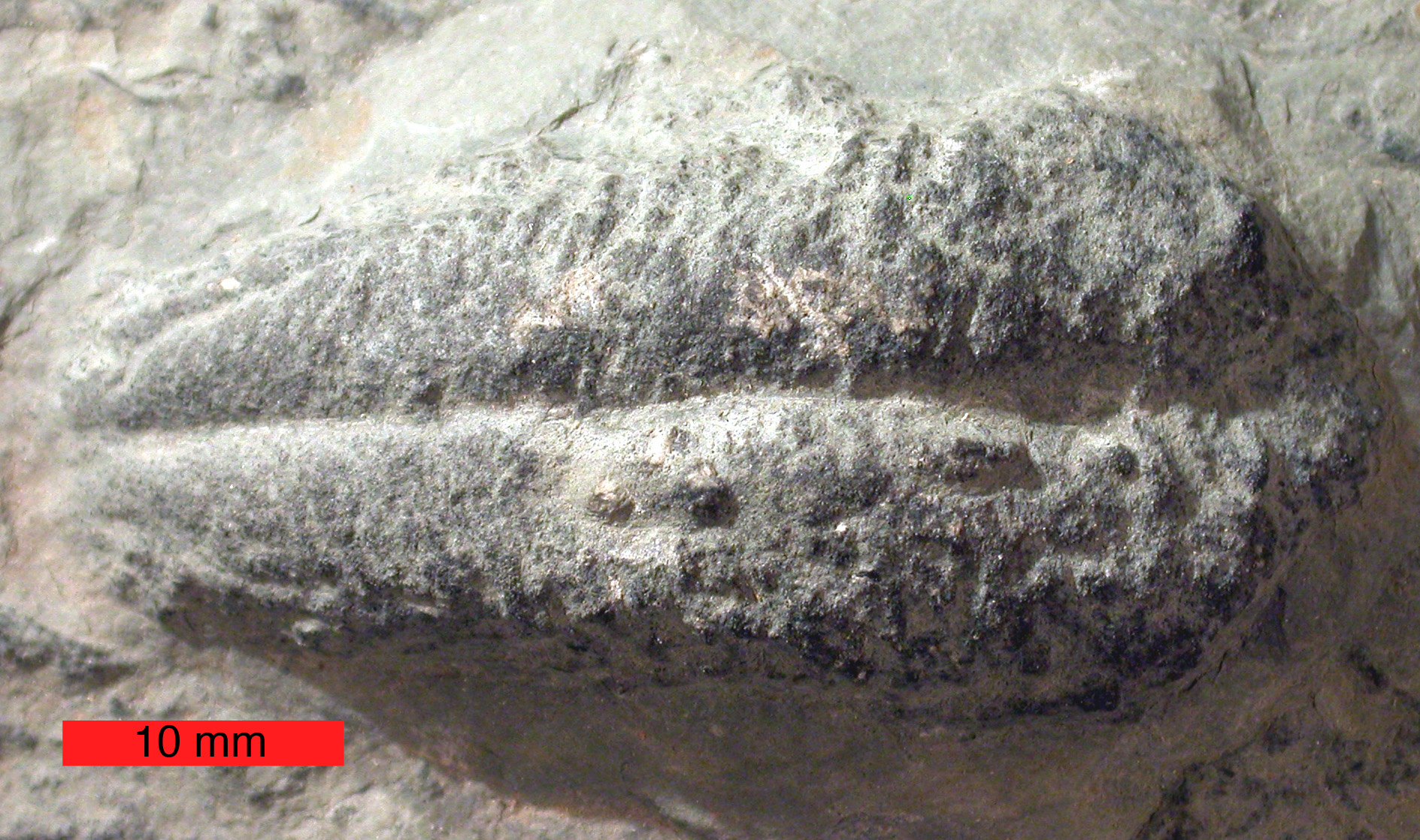
Rusophycus, a "resting trace" of a trilobite; Ordovician of southern Ohio. Scale bar is 10 mm.

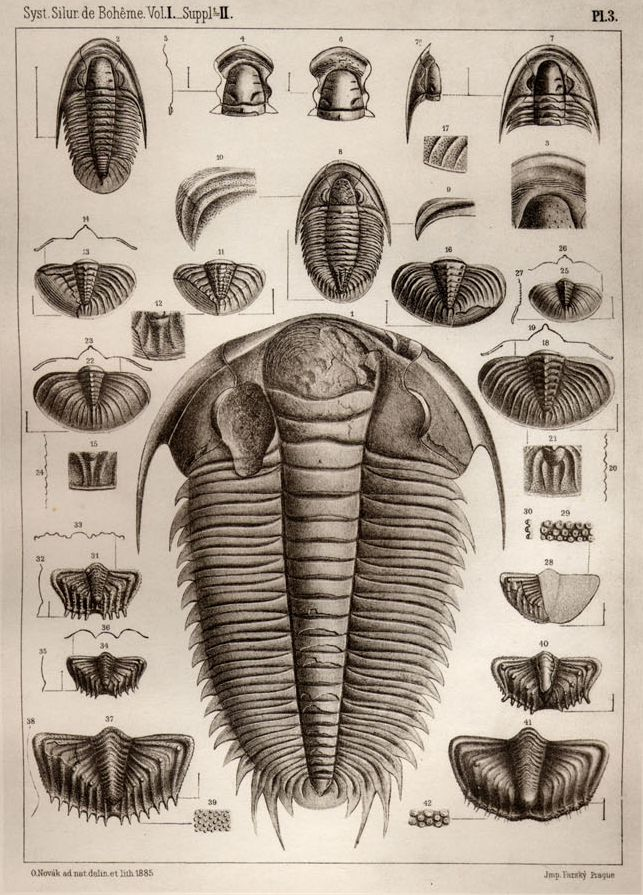
Plate from Barrande's work Système silurien du centre de la Bohême

Trilobites appear to have been primarily marine organisms, since the fossilized remains of trilobites are always found in rocks containing fossils of other salt-water animals such as brachiopods, crinoids, and corals. Some trackways suggest trilobites made at least temporary excursions onto land. Within the marine paleoenvironment, trilobites were found in a broad range from extremely shallow water to very deep water. Trilobites, like brachiopods, crinoids, and corals, are found on all modern continents, and occupied every ancient ocean from which Paleozoic fossils have been collected. The remnants of trilobites can range from the preserved body to pieces of the exoskeleton, which it shed in the process known as ecdysis. In addition, the tracks left behind by trilobites living on the sea floor are often preserved as trace fossils.

There are three main forms of trace fossils associated with trilobites: Rusophycus, Cruziana and Diplichnites—such trace fossils represent the preserved life activity of trilobites active upon the sea floor. Rusophycus, the resting trace, are trilobite excavations involving little or no forward movement and ethological interpretations suggest resting, protection and hunting. Cruziana, the feeding trace, are furrows through the sediment, which are believed to represent the movement of trilobites while deposit feeding. Many of the Diplichnites fossils are believed to be traces made by trilobites walking on the sediment surface. Care must be taken as similar trace fossils are recorded in freshwater and post-Paleozoic deposits, representing non-trilobite origins.

Trilobite fossils are found worldwide, with thousands of known species. Because they appeared quickly in geological time, and moulted like other arthropods, trilobites serve as excellent index fossils, enabling geologists to date the age of the rocks in which they are found. They were among the first fossils to attract widespread attention, and new species are being discovered every year.

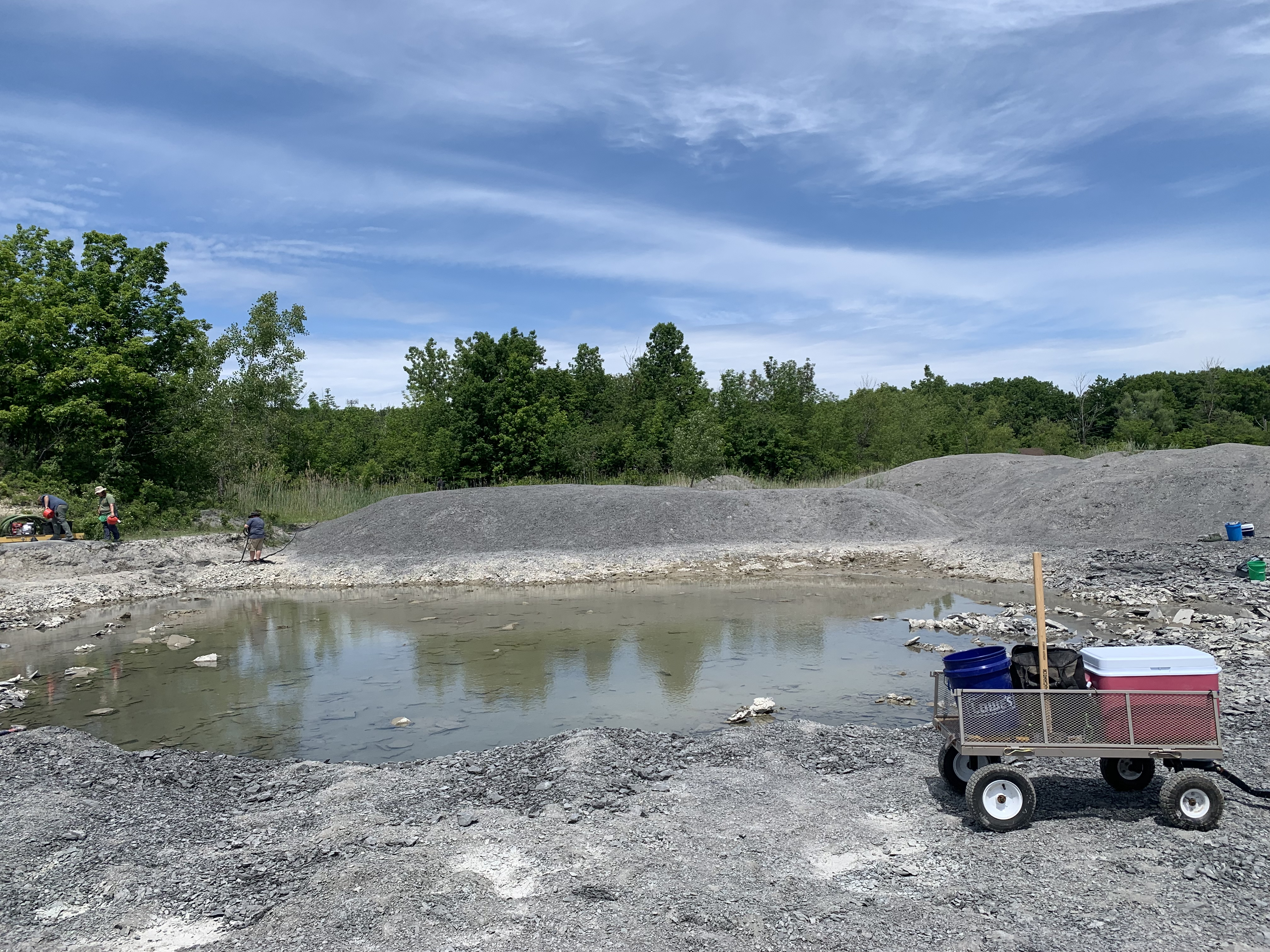
Fossil hunters look for trilobites and other fossils in Penn Dixie Fossil Park and Nature Preserve.

In the United States, the best open-to-the-public collection of trilobites is located in Hamburg, New York. The shale quarry, informally known as Penn Dixie, stopped mining in the 1960s. The large amounts of trilobites were discovered in the 1970s by Dan Cooper. As a well-known rock collector, he incited scientific and public interest in the location. The fossils are dated to the Givetian (387.2–382.7 million years ago) when the Western New York Region was 30 degrees south of the equator and completely covered in water. The site was purchased from Vincent C. Bonerb by the Town of Hamburg with the cooperation of the Hamburg Natural History Society to protect the land from development. In 1994, the quarry became Penn Dixie Fossil Park & Nature Reserve when they received 501(c)3 status and was opened for visitation and collection of trilobite samples. The two most common found samples are Eldredgeops rana and Greenops. The Trilobite Wilderness in California is so-named for the abundance of fossils found there.

A famous location for trilobite fossils in the United Kingdom is Wren's Nest, Dudley, in the West Midlands, where Calymene blumenbachii is found in the Silurian Wenlock Group. This trilobite is featured on the town's coat of arms and was named the Dudley Bug or Dudley Locust by quarrymen who once worked the now abandoned limestone quarries. Llandrindod Wells, Powys, Wales, is another famous trilobite location. The well-known Elrathia kingi trilobite is found in abundance in the Cambrian Wheeler Shale of Utah.

Spectacularly preserved trilobite fossils, often showing soft body parts (legs, gills, antennae, etc.) have been found in British Columbia, Canada (the Cambrian Burgess Shale and similar localities); New York, US (Ordovician Walcott–Rust quarry, near Russia, New York, and Beecher's Trilobite Bed, near Rome, New York); China (Lower Cambrian Maotianshan Shales near Chengjiang); Germany (the Devonian Hunsrück Slates near Bundenbach) and, much more rarely, in trilobite-bearing strata in Utah (Wheeler Shale and other formations), Ontario, and Manuels River, Newfoundland and Labrador.

Sites in Morocco also yield very well-preserved trilobites, many buried in mudslides alive and so perfectly preserved. An industry has developed around their recovery, leading to controversies about practices in restoral. The variety of eye and upper body forms and fragile protuberances is best known from these samples preserved similarly to bodies in Pompeii.

The French palaeontologist Joachim Barrande (1799–1883) carried out his landmark study of trilobites in the Cambrian, Ordovician and Silurian of Bohemia, publishing the first volume of Système silurien du centre de la Bohême in 1852.

== Importance ==
The study of Paleozoic trilobites in the Welsh-English borders by Niles Eldredge was fundamental in formulating and testing punctuated equilibrium as a mechanism of evolution.

Identification of the 'Atlantic' and 'Pacific' trilobite faunas in North America and Europe implied the closure of the Iapetus Ocean (producing the Iapetus suture), thus providing important supporting evidence for the theory of continental drift.

Trilobites have been important in estimating the rate of speciation during the period known as the Cambrian explosion because they are the most diverse group of metazoans known from the fossil record of the early Cambrian.

Trilobites are excellent stratigraphic markers of the Cambrian period: researchers who find trilobites with alimentary prosopon, and a micropygium, have found Early Cambrian strata. Most of the Cambrian stratigraphy is based on the use of trilobite marker fossils.

Trilobites are the state fossils of Ohio (Isotelus), Wisconsin (Calymene celebra) and Pennsylvania (Phacops rana).

== Taxonomy ==
Representatives of the ten orders of trilobites

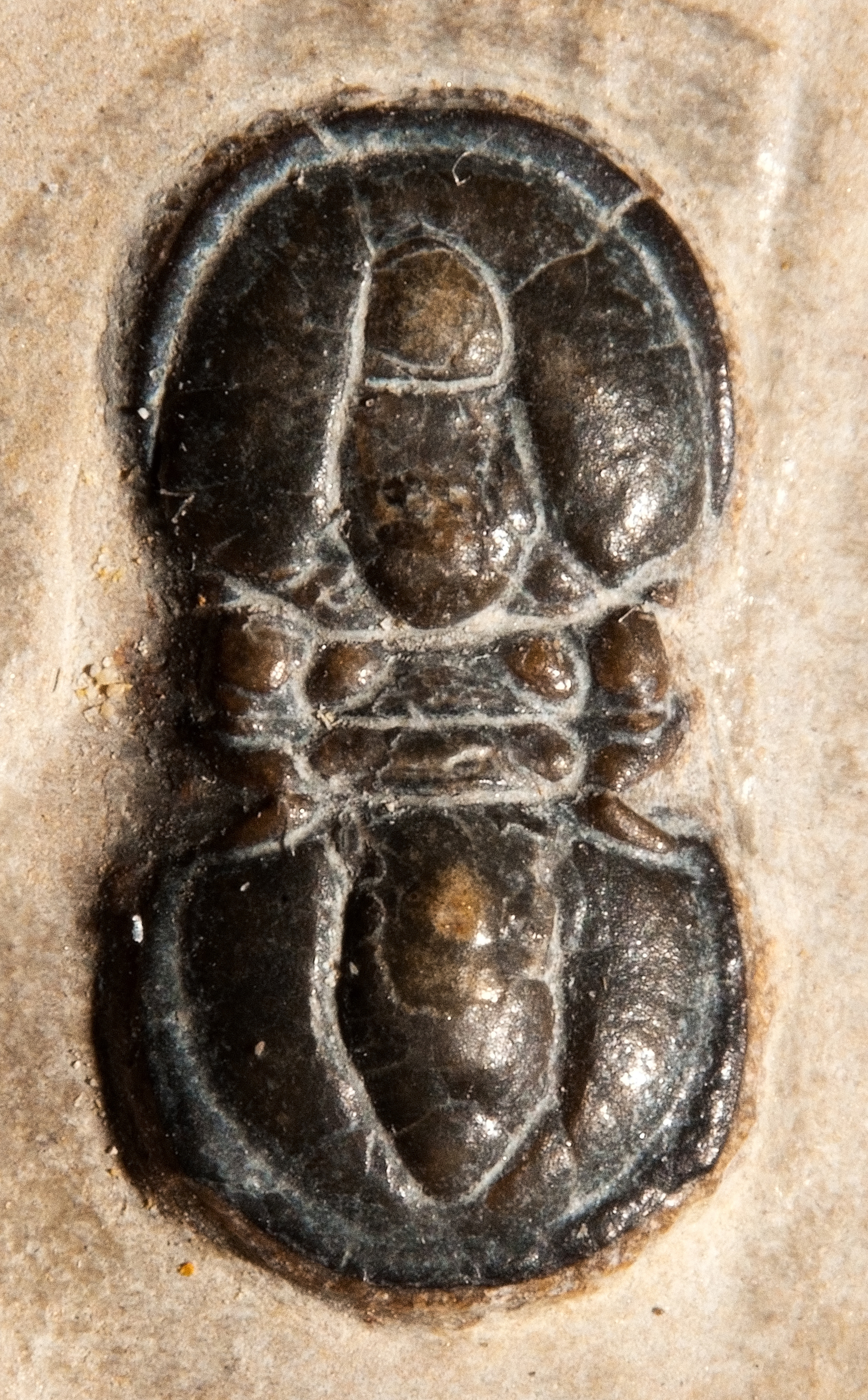
Agnostida

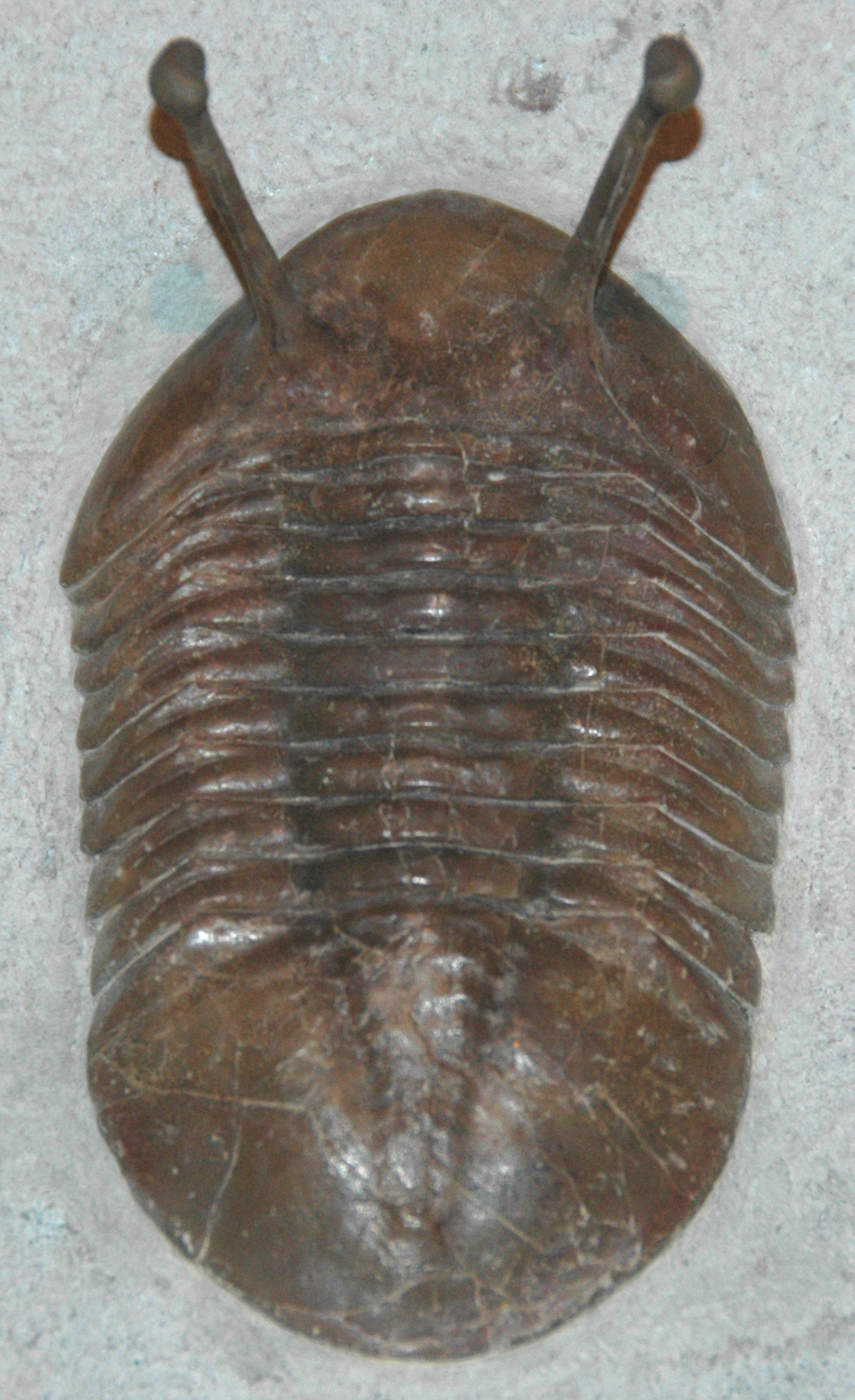
Asaphida

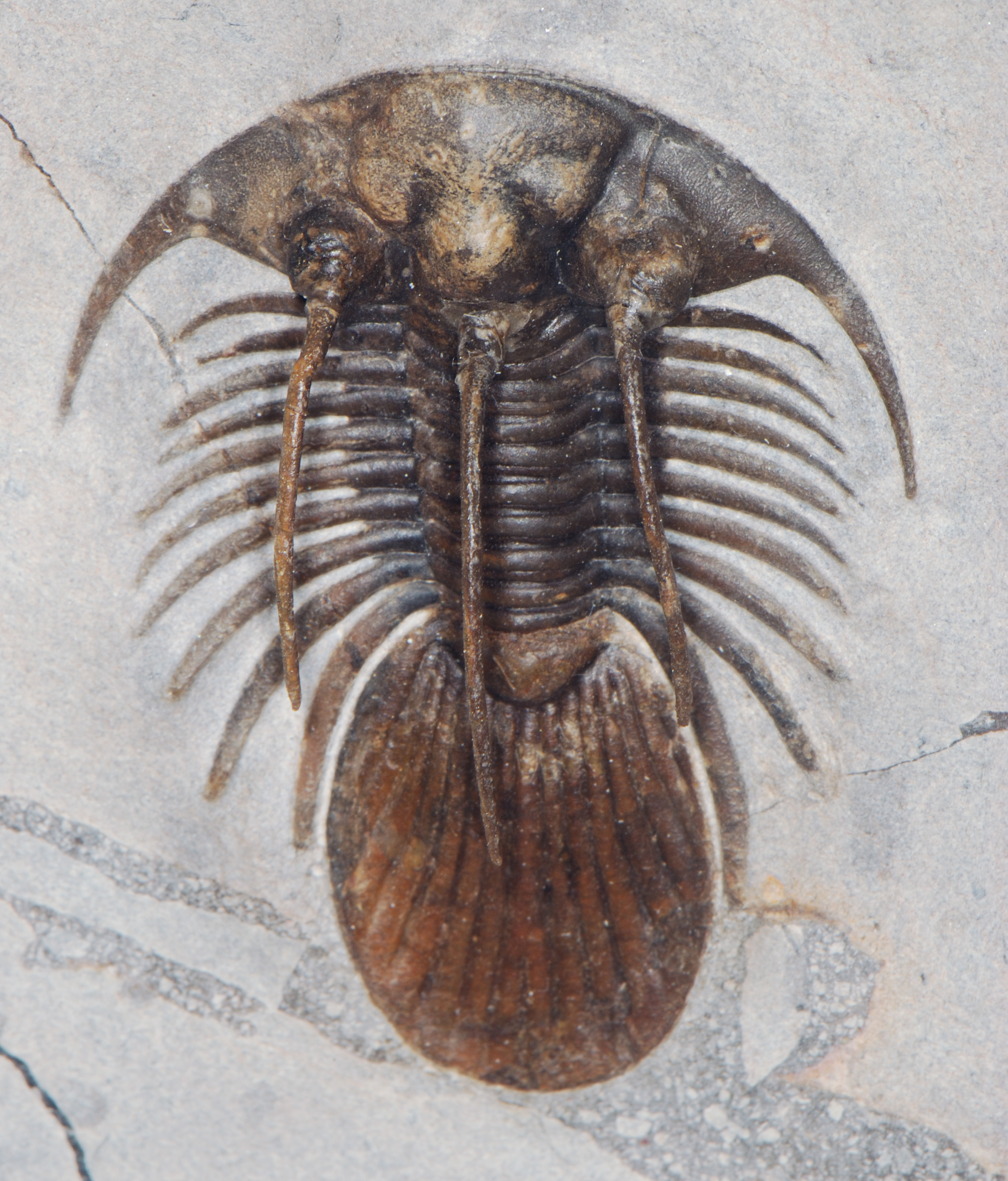
Corynexochida

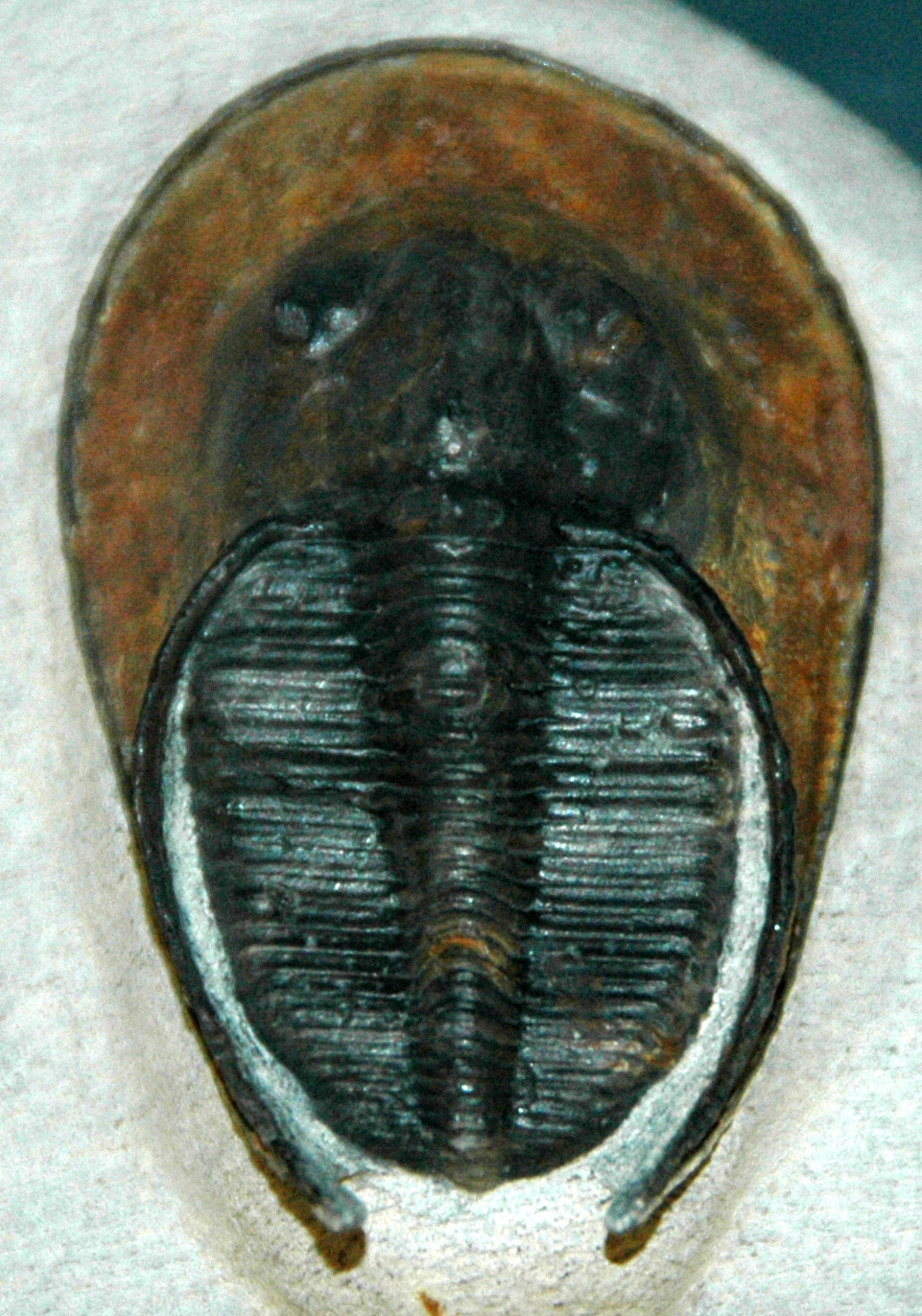
Harpetida

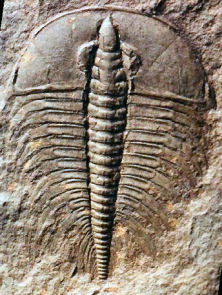
Redlichiida

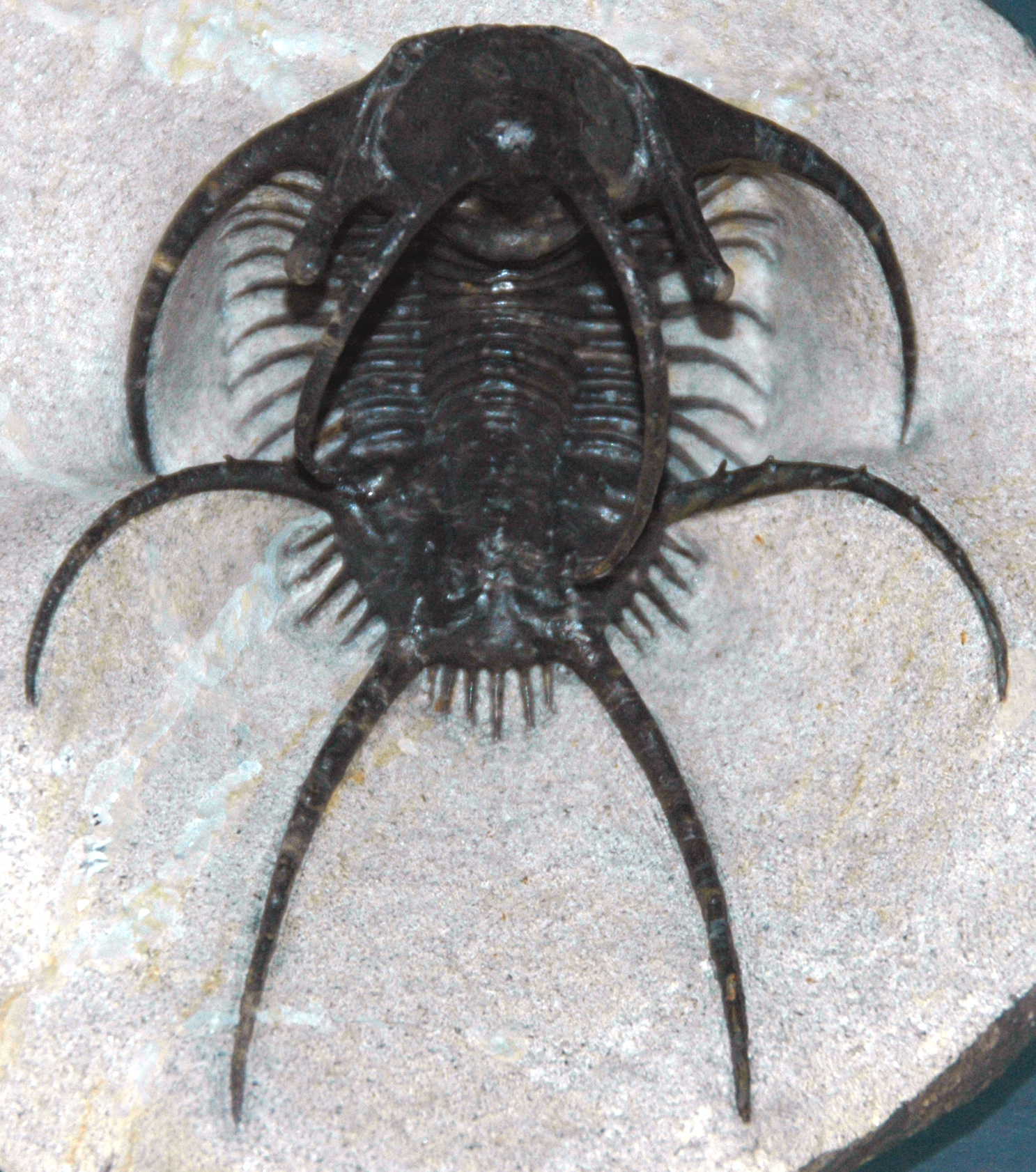
Lichida

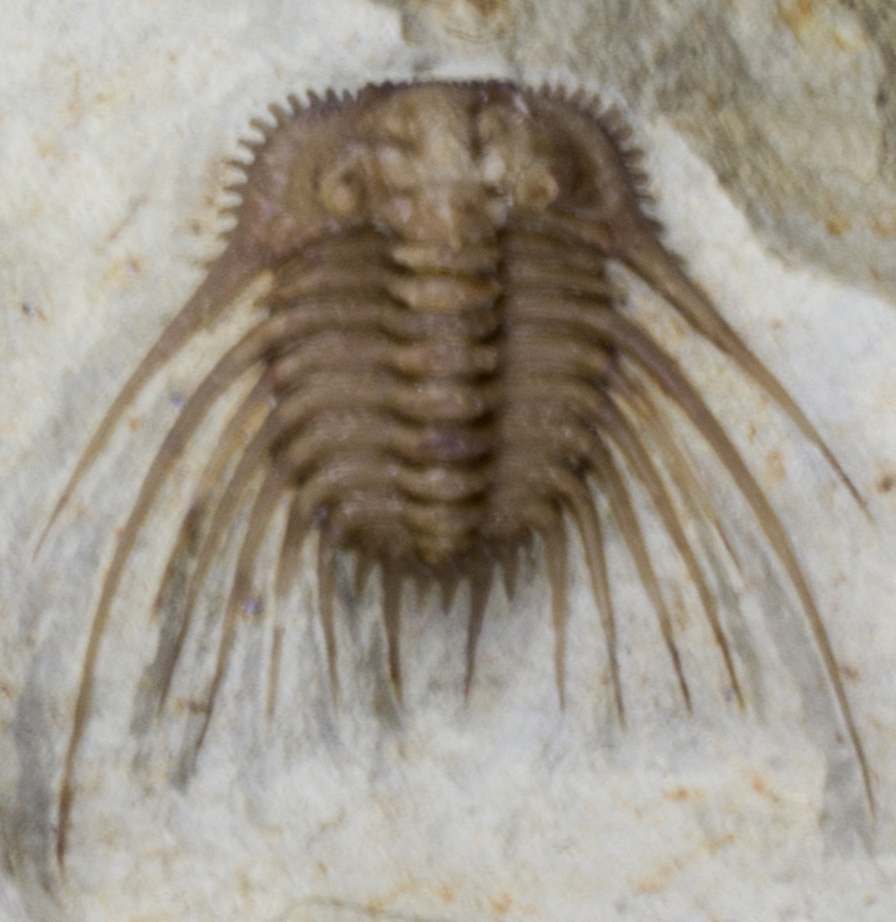
Odontopleurida

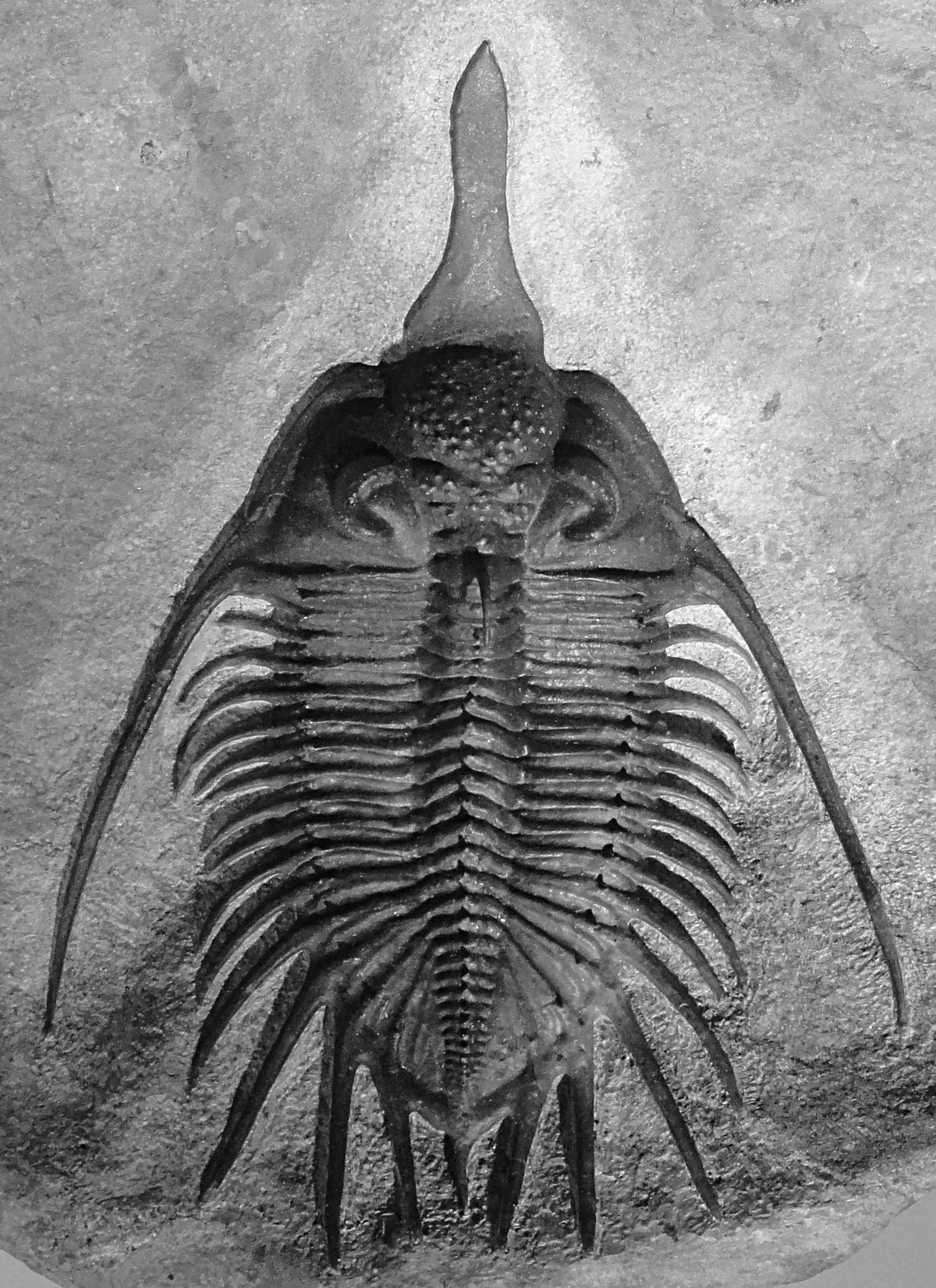
Phacopida

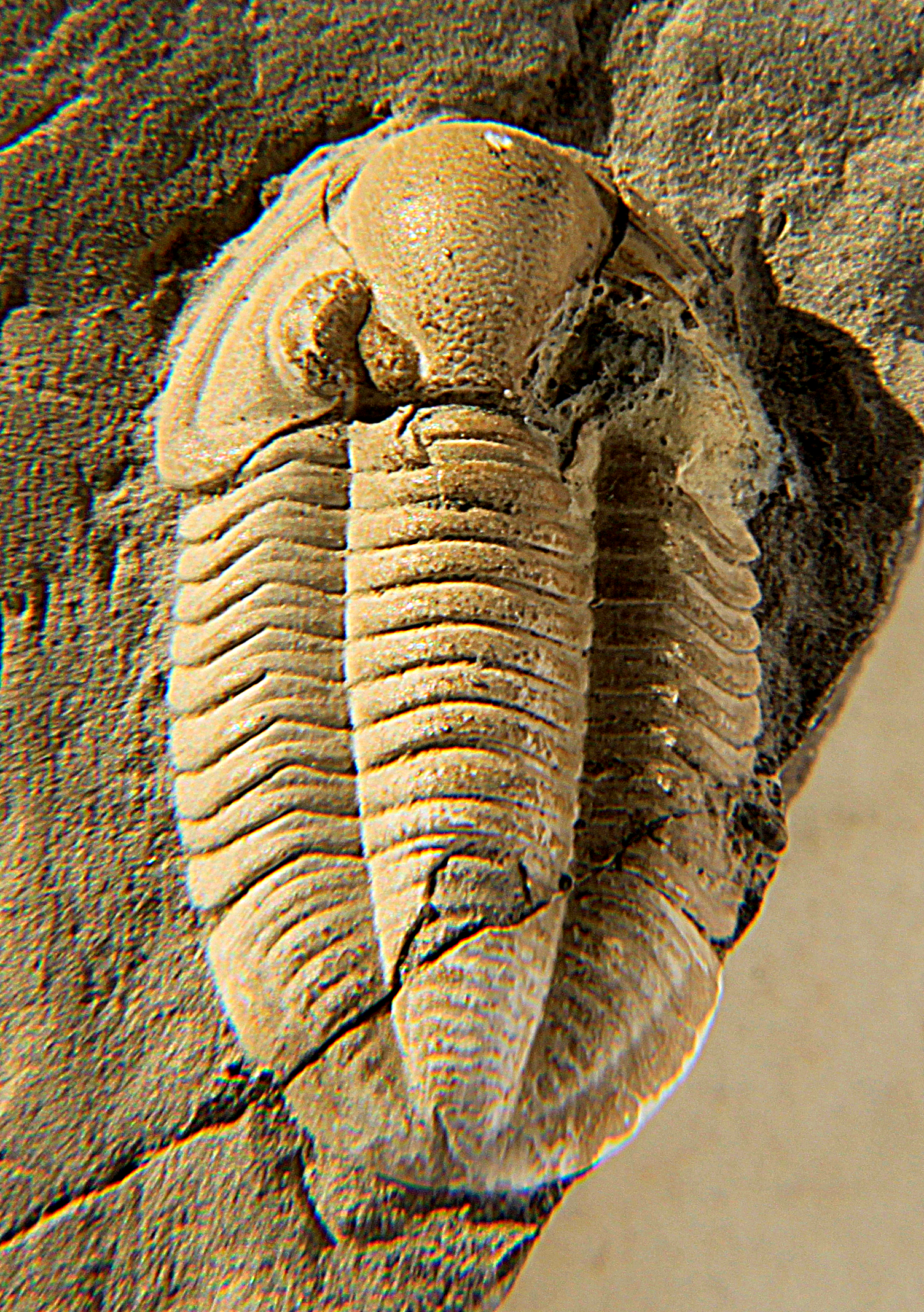
Proetida

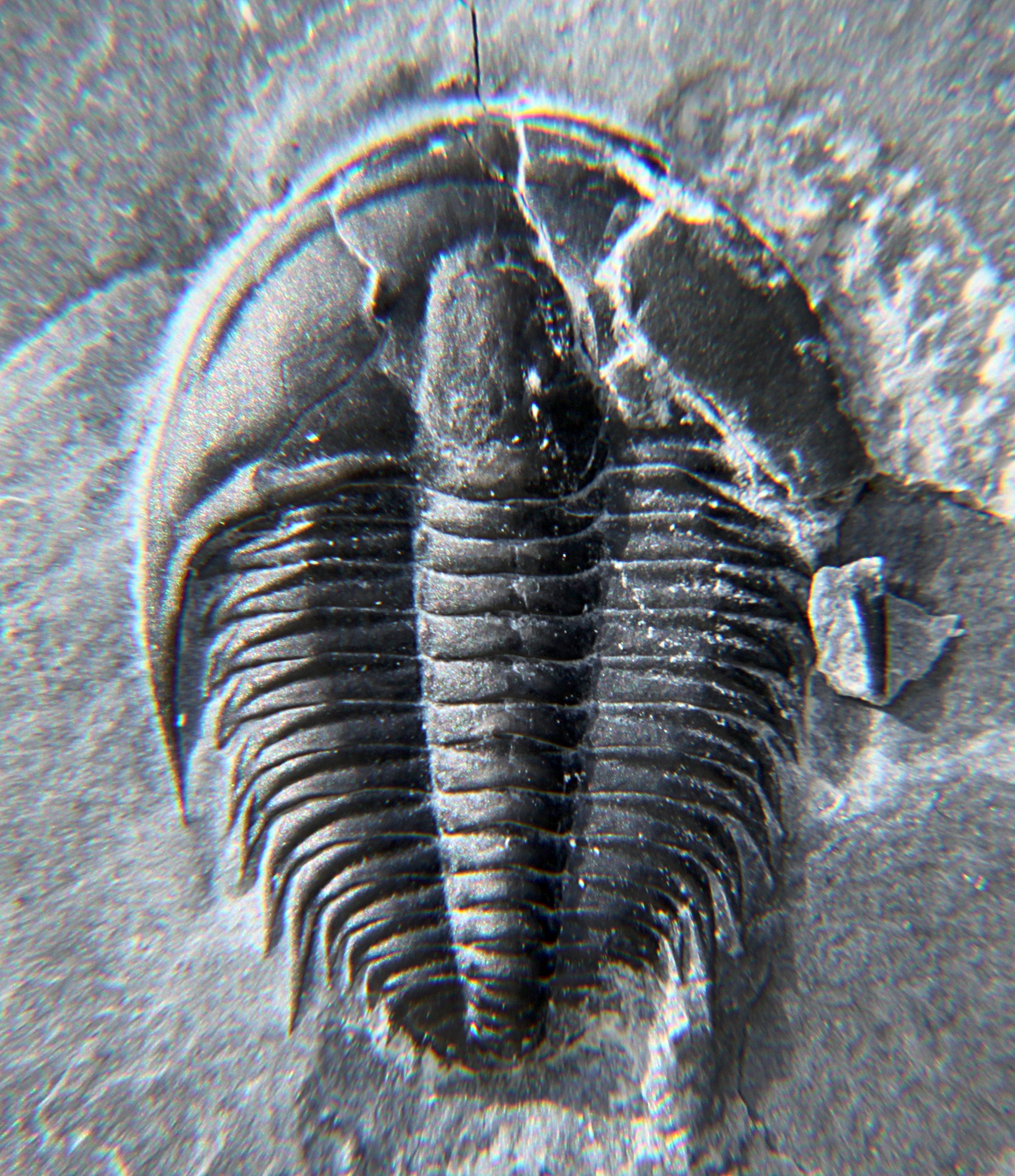
Ptychopariida

The 10 most commonly recognized trilobite orders are Agnostida, Redlichiida, Corynexochida, Lichida, Odontopleurida, Phacopida, Proetida, Asaphida, Harpetida and Ptychopariida. In 2020, an 11th order, Trinucleida, was proposed to be elevated out of the asaphid superfamily Trinucleioidea. Sometimes the Nektaspida are considered trilobites, but these lack a calcified exoskeleton and eyes. Some scholars have proposed that the order Agnostida is polyphyletic, with the suborder Agnostina representing non-trilobite arthropods unrelated to the suborder Eodiscina. Under this hypothesis, Eodiscina would be elevated to a new order, Eodiscida.

Over 22,000 species of trilobite have been described.

Despite their rich fossil record with thousands of described genera found throughout the world, the taxonomy and phylogeny of trilobites have many uncertainties. Except possibly for the members of the orders Phacopida and Lichida (which first appear during the early Ordovician), nine of the eleven trilobite orders appear prior to the end of the Cambrian. Most scientists believe that order Redlichiida, more specifically its suborder Redlichiina, contains a common ancestor of all other orders, with the possible exception of the Agnostina. While many potential phylogenies are found in the literature, most have suborder Redlichiina giving rise to orders Corynexochida and Ptychopariida during the Lower Cambrian, and the Lichida descending from either the Redlichiida or Corynexochida in the Middle Cambrian. Order Ptychopariida is the most problematic order for trilobite classification. In the 1959 Treatise on Invertebrate Paleontology, what are now members of orders Ptychopariida, Asaphida, Proetida and Harpetida were grouped together as order Ptychopariida; subclass Librostoma was erected in 1990 to encompass all of these orders, based on their shared ancestral character of a natant (unattached) hypostome. The most recently recognized of the nine trilobite orders, Harpetida, was erected in 2002. The progenitor of order Phacopida is unclear.

== Morphology ==
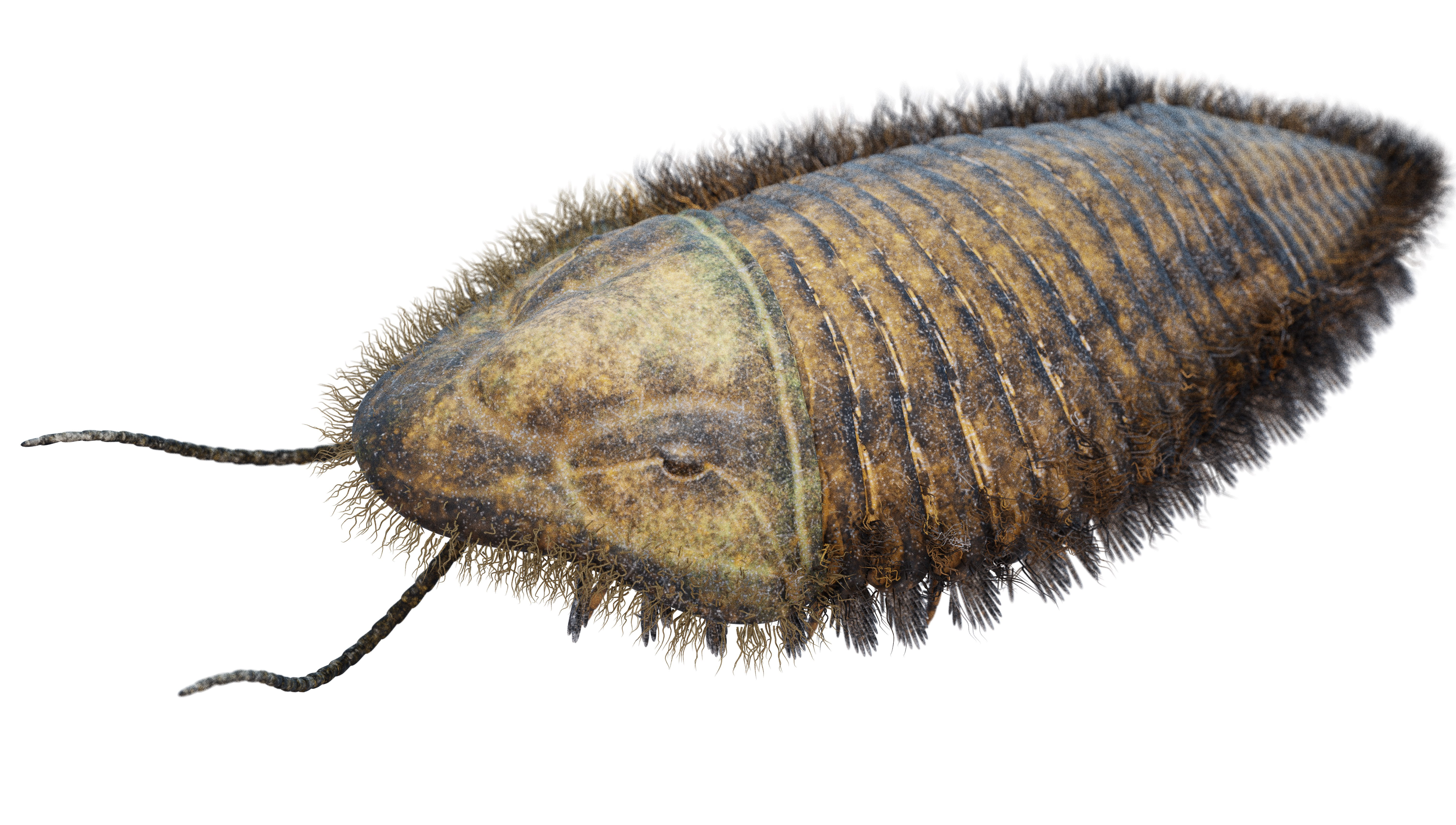
Life reconstruction of Trimerus delphinocephalus, showing the dense setae covering the arthropod's body

When trilobites are found, only the exoskeleton is preserved (often in an incomplete state) in all but a handful of locations. A few locations (Lagerstätten) preserve identifiable soft body parts (legs, gills, musculature & digestive tract) and enigmatic traces of other structures (e.g. fine details of eye structure) as well as the exoskeleton. Of the 20,000 known species only 38 have fossils with preserved appendages.

Trilobites range in length from minute at less than 1 millimetre (0.039 in) to very large at over 70 centimetres (28 in), with an average size range of 3–10 cm (1.2–3.9 in). Supposedly the smallest species is Acanthopleurella stipulae with a maximum of 1.5 millimetres (0.059 in). The world's largest-known trilobite specimen, assigned to Isotelus rex is 72 cm (28 in) in length. It was found in 1998 by Canadian scientists in Ordovician rocks on the shores of Hudson Bay. However, a partial specimen of the Ordovician trilobite Hungioides bohemicus found in 2009 in Arouca, Portugal is estimated to have measured when complete 86.5 cm (34.1 in) in length.

The trilobite body is divided into three major sections (tagmata): 1 – cephalon; 2 – thorax; 3 – pygidium. Trilobites are so named for the three longitudinal lobes: 4 – right pleural lobe; 5 – axial lobe; 6 – left pleural lobe; the antennae and legs are not shown in these diagrams.

Only the upper (dorsal) part of their exoskeleton is mineralized, composed of calcite and calcium phosphate minerals in a lattice of chitin, and is curled round the lower edge to produce a small fringe called the "doublure". Their appendages and soft underbelly were non-mineralized. Three distinctive tagmata (sections) are present: cephalon (head); thorax (body) and pygidium (tail).

=== Terminology ===
As might be expected for a group of animals comprising c. 5,000 genera, the morphology and description of trilobites can be complex. Despite morphological complexity and an unclear position within higher classifications, there are a number of characteristics which distinguish the trilobites from other arthropods: a generally sub-elliptical, dorsal, chitinous exoskeleton divided longitudinally into three distinct lobes (from which the group gets its name); having a distinct, relatively large head shield (cephalon) articulating axially with a thorax comprising articulated transverse segments, the hindmost of which are almost invariably fused to form a tail shield (pygidium). When describing differences between trilobite taxa, the presence, size, and shape of the cephalic features are often mentioned.

During moulting, the exoskeleton generally splits between the head and thorax, which is why so many trilobite fossils are missing one or the other. In most groups facial sutures on the cephalon helped facilitate moulting. Similar to lobsters and crabs, trilobites would have physically "grown" between the moult stage and the hardening of the new exoskeleton.

=== Cephalon ===
Morphology of the trilobite cephalon

The major subdivisions of the cephalon

The subdivisions can be further broken down into different areas used in describing trilobite cephalic morphology. 1 – preocular area; 2 – palpebral area; 3 – postocular area; 4 – posterolateral projection; 5 – occipital ring; 6 – glabella; 7 – posterior area; 8 – lateral border; 9 – librigenal area; 10 – preglabellar area

A trilobite's cephalon, or head section, is highly variable with a lot of morphological complexity. The glabella forms a dome underneath which sat the "crop" or "stomach". Generally, the exoskeleton has few distinguishing ventral features, but the cephalon often preserves muscle attachment scars and occasionally the hypostome, a small rigid plate comparable to the ventral plate in other arthropods. A toothless mouth and stomach sat upon the hypostome with the mouth facing backward at the rear edge of the hypostome.

Hypostome morphology is highly variable; sometimes supported by an un-mineralised membrane (natant), sometimes fused onto the anterior doublure with an outline very similar to the glabella above (conterminant) or fused to the anterior doublure with an outline significantly different from the glabella (impendent). Many variations in shape and placement of the hypostome have been described. The size of the glabella and the lateral fringe of the cephalon, together with hypostome variation, have been linked to different lifestyles, diets and specific ecological niches.

The anterior and lateral fringe of the cephalon is greatly enlarged in the Harpetida, in other species a bulge in the pre-glabellar area is preserved that suggests a brood pouch. Highly complex compound eyes are another obvious feature of the cephalon.

==== Facial sutures ====
Facial or cephalic sutures are the natural fracture lines in the cephalon of trilobites. Their function was to assist the trilobite in shedding its old exoskeleton during ecdysis (or molting).

All species assigned to the suborder Olenellina, that became extinct at the very end of the Early Cambrian (like Fallotaspis, Nevadia, Judomia, and Olenellus) lacked facial sutures. They are believed to have never developed facial sutures, having pre-dated their evolution. Because of this (along with other primitive characteristics), they are thought to be the earliest ancestors of later trilobites.

Some other later trilobites also lost facial sutures secondarily. The type of sutures found in different species are used extensively in the taxonomy and phylogeny of trilobites.

==== Dorsal sutures ====
The dorsal surface of the trilobite cephalon (the frontmost tagma, or the 'head') can be divided into two regions—the cranidium and the librigena ("free cheeks"). The cranidium can be further divided into the glabella (the central lobe in the cephalon) and the fixigena ("fixed cheeks"). The facial sutures lie along the anterior edge, at the division between the cranidium and the librigena.

Trilobite facial sutures on the dorsal side can be roughly divided into five main types according to where the sutures end relative to the genal angle (the edges where the side and rear margins of the cephalon converge).

- Absent – Facial sutures are lacking in the Olenellina. This is considered a primitive state, and is always combined with the presence of eyes.
- Proparian – The facial suture ends in front of the genal angle, along the lateral margin. Example genera showing this type of suture include Dalmanites of Phacopina (Phacopida) and Ekwipagetia of Eodiscina (Agnostida).
- Gonatoparian – The facial suture ends at the tip of the genal angle. Example genera showing this type of suture include Calymene and Trimerus of Calymenina (Phacopida).
- Opisthoparian – The facial suture ends at the posterior margin of the cephalon. Example genera showing this type of suture include Peltura of Olenina (Ptychopariida) and Bumastus of Illaenina (Corynexochida). This is the most common type of facial suture.
- Hypoparian or marginal – In some trilobites, dorsal sutures may be secondarily lost. Several exemplary time series of species show the "migration" of the dorsal suture until it coincides with the margins of the cephalon. As the visual surface of the eye is on the diminishing free cheek (or librigena), the number of lenses tends to go down, and eventually the eye disappears. The loss of dorsal sutures may arise from the proparian state, such as in some Eodiscina like Weymouthia, all Agnostina, and some Phacopina such as Ductina. The marginal sutures exhibited by the harpetids and trinucleioids are derived from opisthoparian sutures. On the other hand, blindness is not always accompanied by the loss of facial sutures.

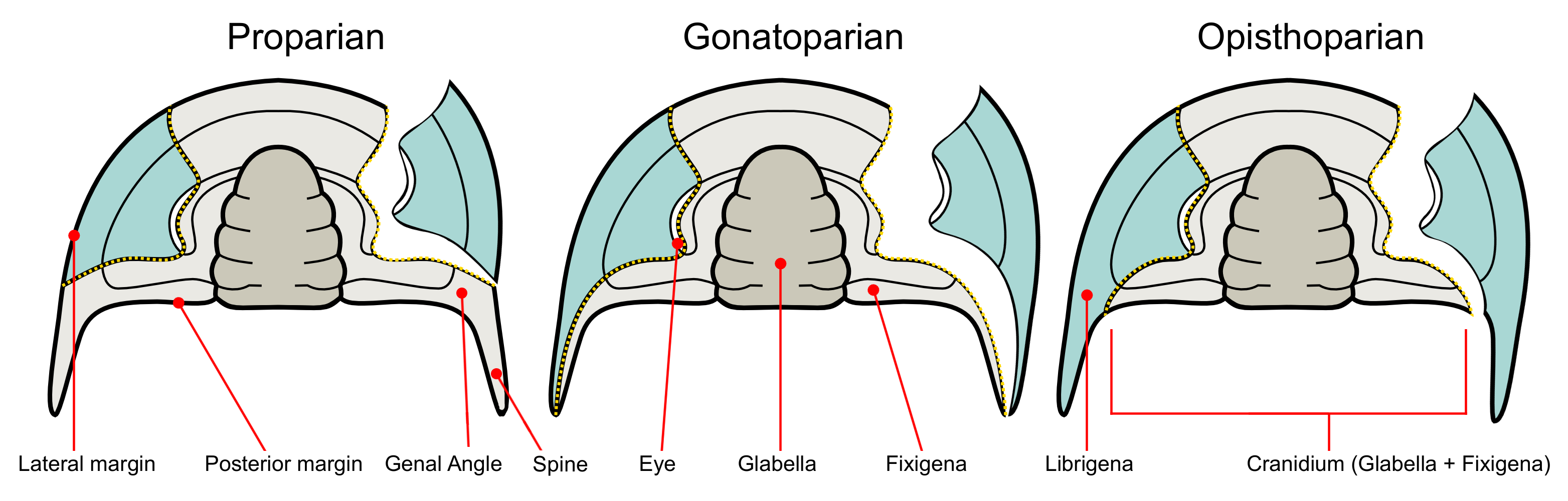

The primitive state of the dorsal sutures is proparian. Opisthoparian sutures have developed several times independently. There are no examples of proparian sutures developing in taxa with opisthoparian ancestry. Trilobites that exhibit opisthoparian sutures as adults commonly have proparian sutures as instars (known exceptions being Yunnanocephalus and Duyunaspis). Hypoparian sutures have also arisen independently in several groups of trilobites.

The course of the facial sutures from the front of the visual surface varies at least as strongly as it does in the rear, but the lack of a clear reference point similar to the genal angle makes it difficult to categorize. One of the more pronounced states is that the front of the facial sutures do not cut the lateral or frontal border on its own, but coincide in front of the glabella, and cut the frontal border at the midline. This is, inter alia, the case in the Asaphida. Even more pronounced is the situation that the frontal branches of the facial sutures end in each other, resulting in yoked free cheeks. This is known in Triarthrus, and in the Phacopidae, but in that family the facial sutures are not functional, as can be concluded from the fact that free cheeks are not found separated from the cranidium.

There are also two types of sutures in the dorsal surface connected to the compound eyes of trilobites. They are:

- Ocular sutures – are sutures surrounding the edges of the compound eye. Trilobites with these sutures lose the entire surface of the eyes when molting. It is common among Cambrian trilobites.
- Palpebral sutures – are sutures which form part of the dorsal facial suture running along the top edges of the compound eye.

===== Ventral sutures =====
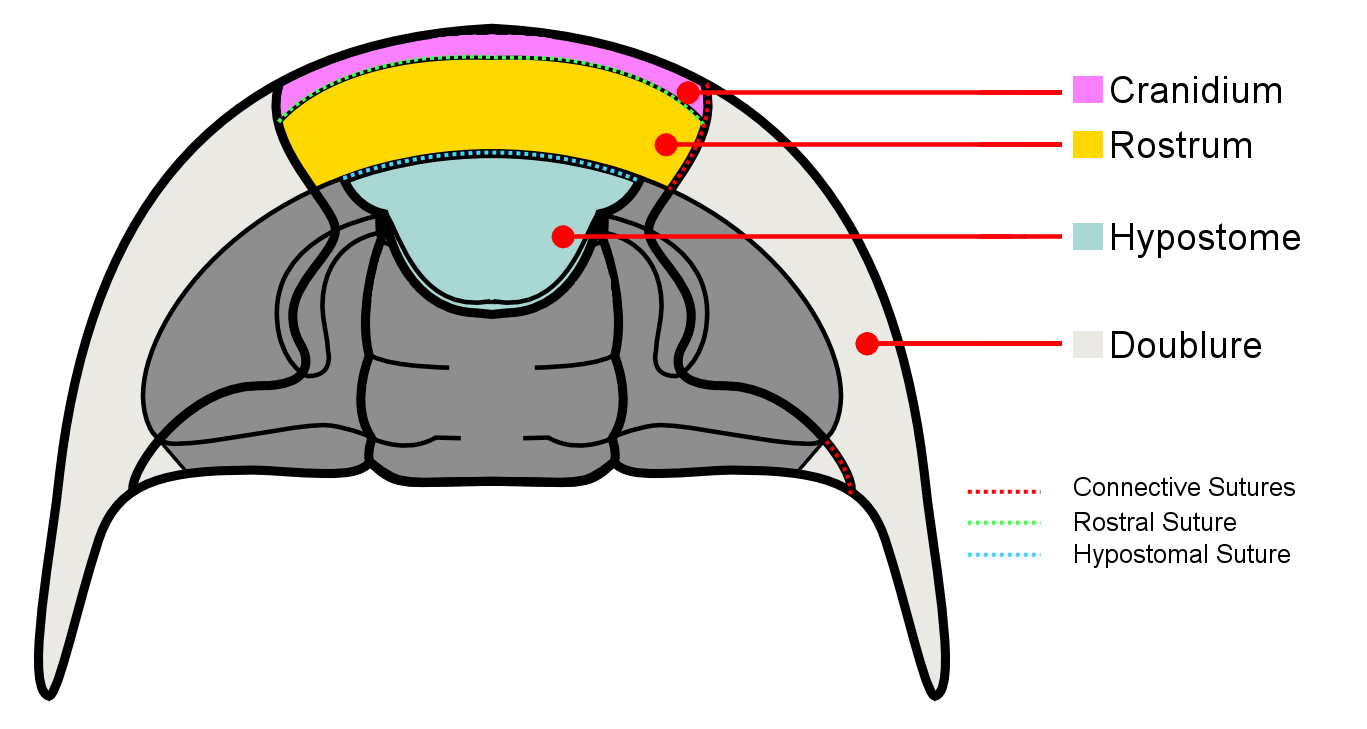

Dorsal facial sutures continue downward to the ventral side of the cephalon where they become the Connective sutures that divide the doublure. The following are the types of ventral sutures.

- Connective sutures – are the sutures that continue from the facial sutures past the front margin of the cephalon.
- Rostral suture – is only present when the trilobite possesses a rostrum (or rostral plate). It connects the rostrum to the front part of the dorsal cranidium.
- Hypostomal suture – separates the hypostome from the doublure when the hypostome is of the attached type. It is absent when the hypostome is free-floating (i.e. natant). it is also absent in some coterminant hypostomes where the hypostome is fused to the doublure.
- Median suture – exhibited by asaphid trilobites, they are formed when instead of becoming connective sutures, the two dorsal sutures converge at a point in front of the cephalon then divide straight down the center of the doublure.

==== Rostrum ====
The rostrum (or the rostral plate) is a distinct part of the doublure located at the front of the cephalon. It is separated from the rest of the doublure by the rostral suture.

During molting in trilobites like Paradoxides, the rostrum is used to anchor the front part of the trilobite as the cranidium separates from the librigena. The opening created by the arching of the body provides an exit for the molting trilobite.

It is absent in some trilobites like Lachnostoma.

==== Hypostome ====
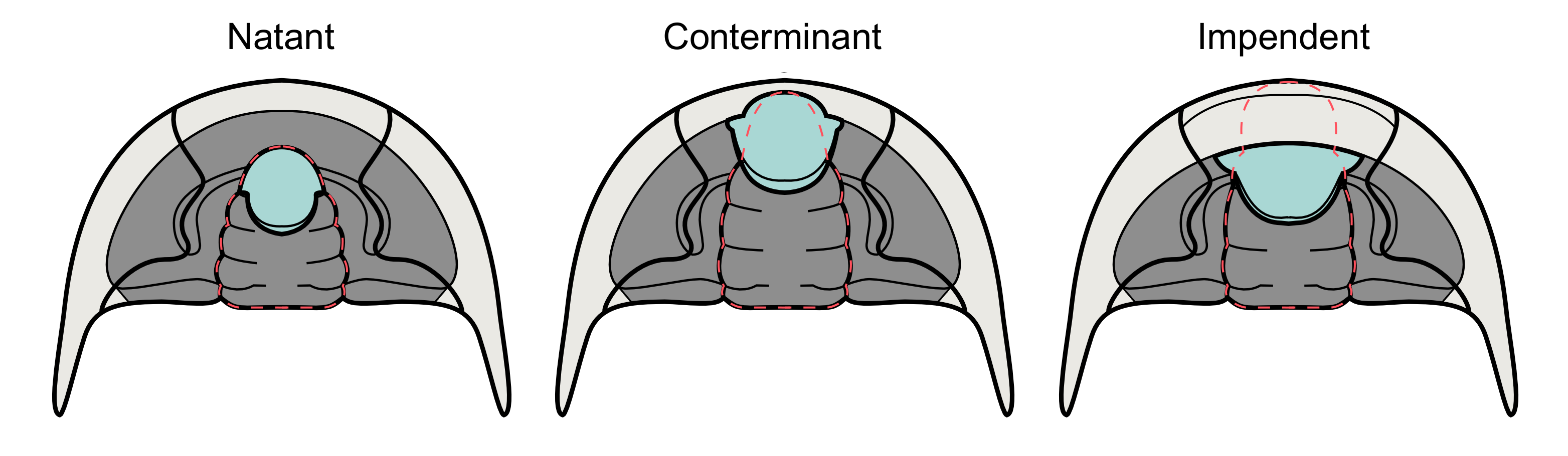
Illustration of the three types of hypostome. Doublure is shown in light gray, the inside surface of the cephalon in dark gray, and the hypostome in light blue. The glabella is outlined in red broken lines.

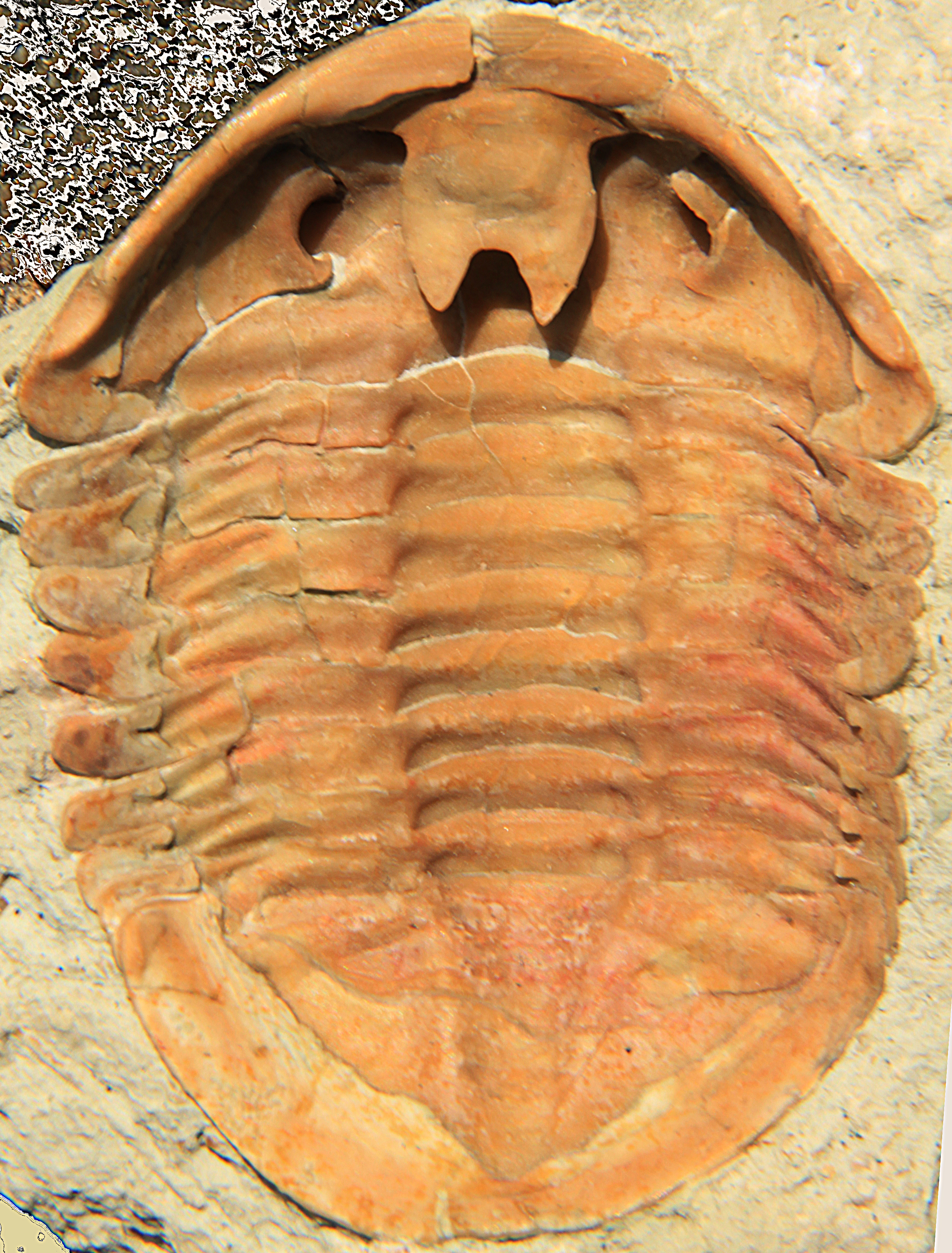
Asaphus expansus ventral side prepared, showing the attachment of the hypostome

The hypostome is the hard mouthpart of the trilobite found on the ventral side of the cephalon typically below the glabella. The hypostome can be classified into three types based on whether they are permanently attached to the rostrum or not and whether they are aligned to the anterior dorsal tip of the glabella.

- Natant – Hypostome not attached to doublure. Aligned with front edge of glabella.
- Conterminant – Hypostome attached to rostral plate of doublure. Aligned with front edge of glabella.
- Impendent – Hypostome attached to rostral plate but not aligned to glabella.

=== Thorax ===
The thorax is a series of articulated segments that lie between the cephalon and pygidium. The number of segments varies between 2 and 103 with most species in the 2 to 16 range.

Each segment consists of the central axial ring and the outer pleurae, which protected the limbs and gills. The pleurae are sometimes abbreviated or extended to form long spines. Apodemes are bulbous projections on the ventral surface of the exoskeleton to which most leg muscles attached, although some leg muscles attached directly to the exoskeleton. Determining a junction between thorax and pygidium can be difficult and many segment counts suffer from this problem.

=== Volvation ===
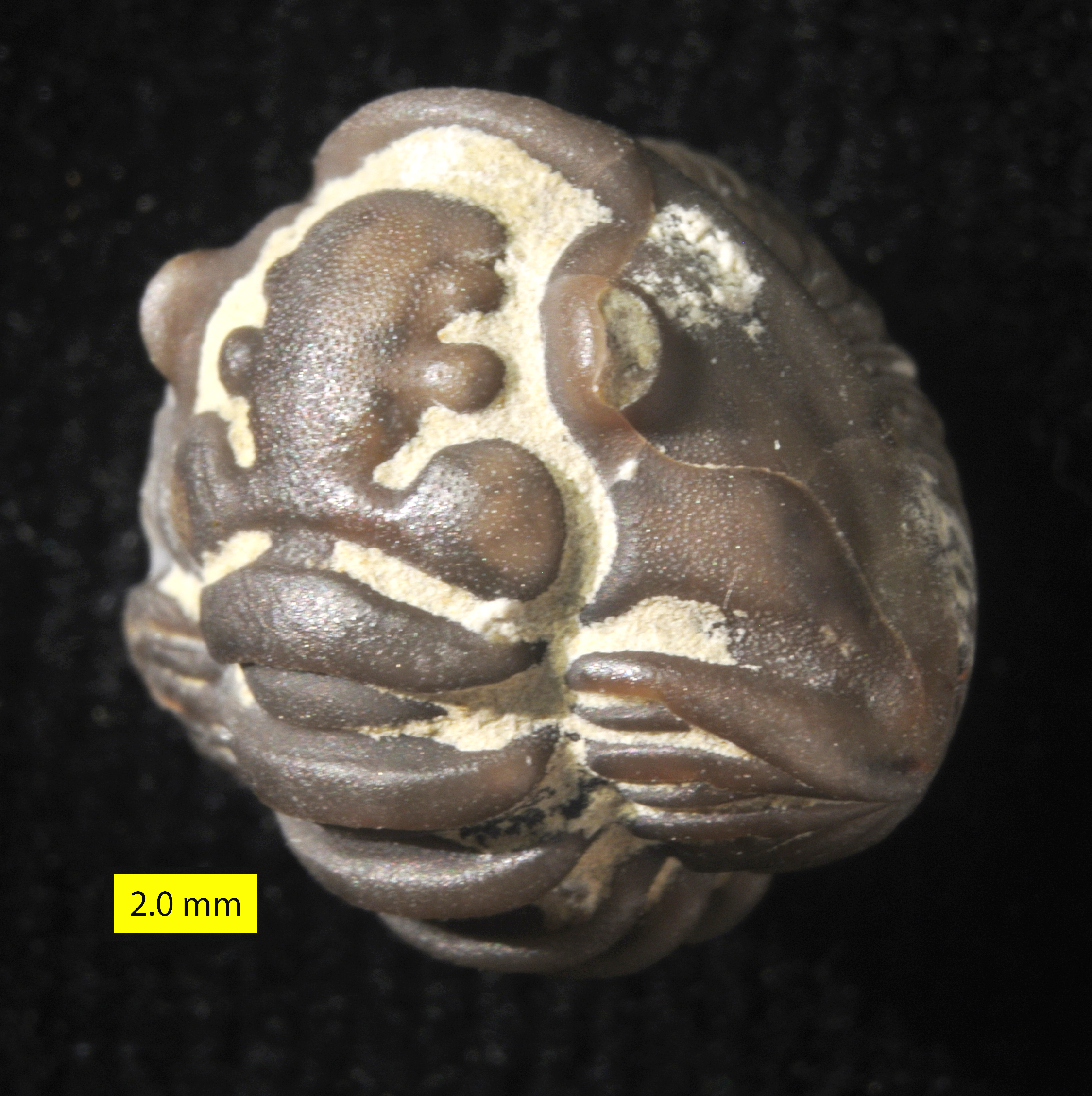
An enrolled phacopid trilobite Flexicalymene meeki from the Upper Ordovician of Ohio

Trilobite fossils are often found "enrolled" (curled up) like modern pill bugs for protection; evidence suggests enrollment ("volvation") helped protect against the inherent weakness of the arthropod cuticle that was exploited by anomalocarid predators. The earliest evidence of volvation is a little over 510 million years old and has been found in Olenellidae, but these forms did not have any of the interlocking mechanisms found in later trilobites.

Some trilobites achieved a fully closed capsule (e.g. Phacops), while others with long pleural spines (e.g. Selenopeltis) left a gap at the sides or those with a small pygidium (e.g. Paradoxides) left a gap between the cephalon and pygidium. In Phacops, the pleurae overlap a smooth bevel (facet) allowing a close seal with the doublure. The doublure carries a Panderian notch or protuberance on each segment to prevent over rotation and achieve a good seal. Even in an agnostid, with only 2 articulating thoracic segments, the process of enrollment required a complex musculature to contract the exoskeleton and return to the flat condition.

=== Pygidium ===
The pygidium is formed from a number of segments and the telson fused together. Segments in the pygidium are similar to the thoracic segments (bearing biramous limbs) but are not articulated. Trilobites can be described based on the pygidium being micropygous (pygidium smaller than cephalon), subisopygous (pygidium sub equal to cephalon), isopygous (pygidium equal in size to cephalon), or macropygous (pygidium larger than cephalon).

=== Prosopon (surface sculpture) ===
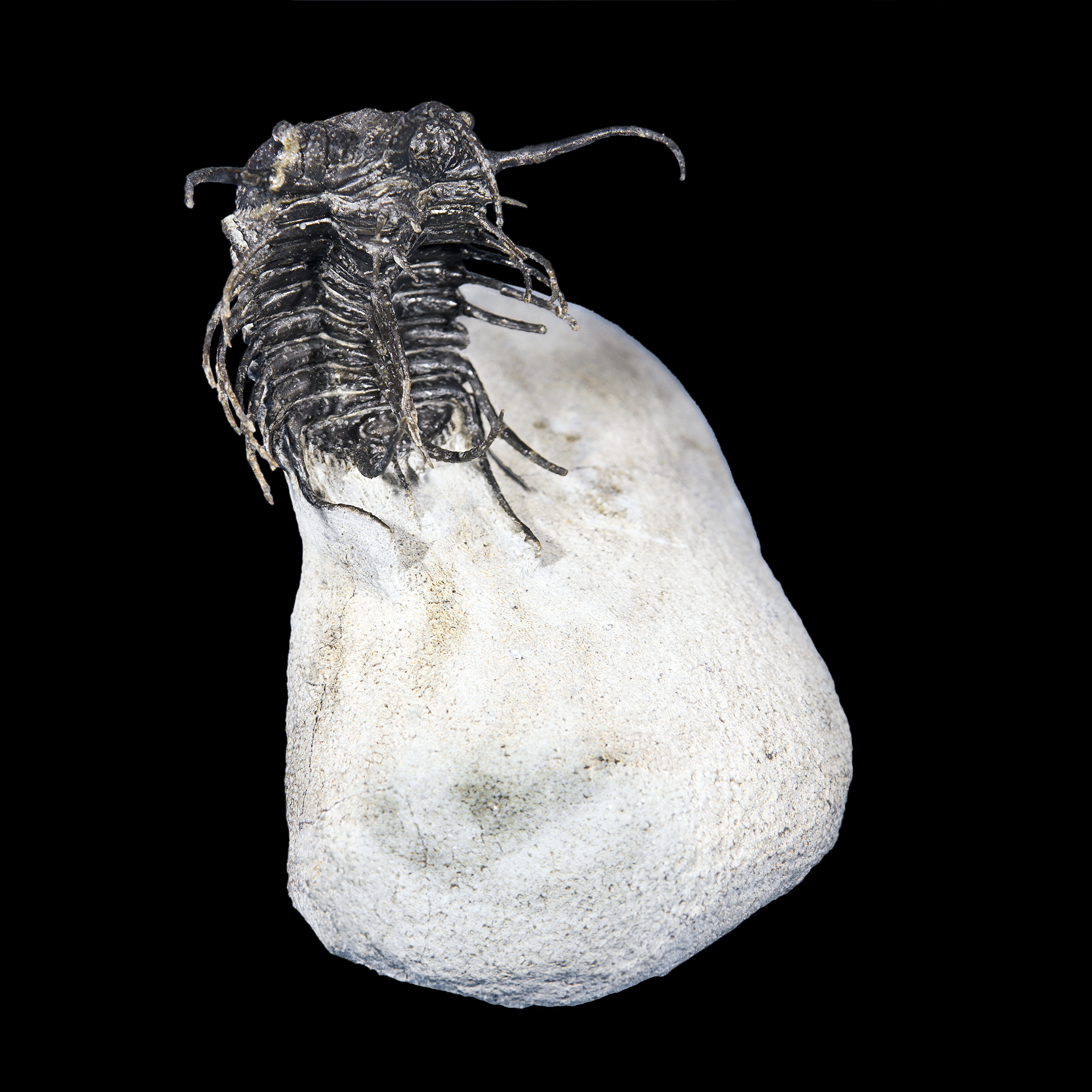
Koneprusia brutoni, an example of a species with elaborate spines from the Devonian Hamar Laghdad Formation, Alnif, Morocco

Trilobite exoskeletons show a variety of small-scale structures collectively called prosopon. Prosopon does not include large scale extensions of the cuticle (e.g. hollow pleural spines) but to finer scale features, such as ribbing, domes, pustules, pitting, ridging and perforations. The exact purpose of the prosopon is not resolved but suggestions include structural strengthening, sensory pits or hairs, preventing predator attacks and maintaining aeration while enrolled. In one example, alimentary ridge networks (easily visible in Cambrian trilobites) might have been either digestive or respiratory tubes in the cephalon and other regions.

=== Spines ===
Some trilobites such as those of the order Lichida evolved elaborate spiny forms, from the Ordovician until the end of the Devonian period. Examples of these specimens have been found in the Hamar Laghdad Formation of Alnif in Morocco. Spectacular spined trilobites have also been found in western Russia; Oklahoma, US; and Ontario, Canada.

Some trilobites had horns on their heads similar to several modern beetles. Based on the size, location, and shape of the horns it has been suggested that these horns may have been used to combat for mates. Horns were widespread in the family Raphiophoridae (Asaphida). Another function of these spines was protection from predators. When enrolled, trilobite spines offered additional protection. This conclusion is likely to be applicable to other trilobites as well, such as in the Phacopid trilobite genus Walliserops, that developed spectacular tridents.

== Soft body parts ==
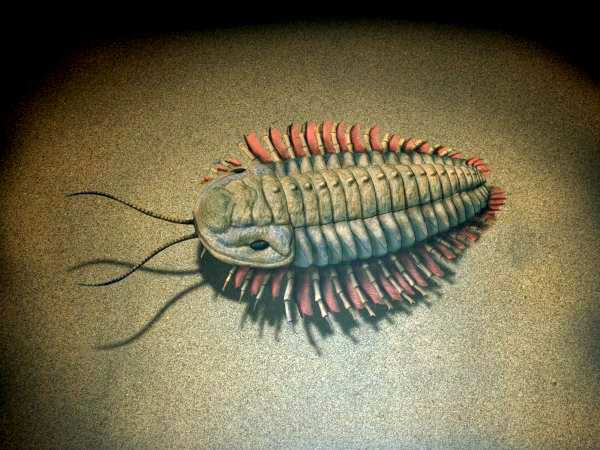
Life reconstruction of Triarthrus eatoni based on preserved soft body parts

Olenoides serratus male diagrammatic reconstruction

Only 21 or so species are described from which soft body parts are preserved, so some features (e.g. the posterior antenniform cerci preserved only in Olenoides serratus) remain difficult to assess in the wider picture.

=== Appendages ===
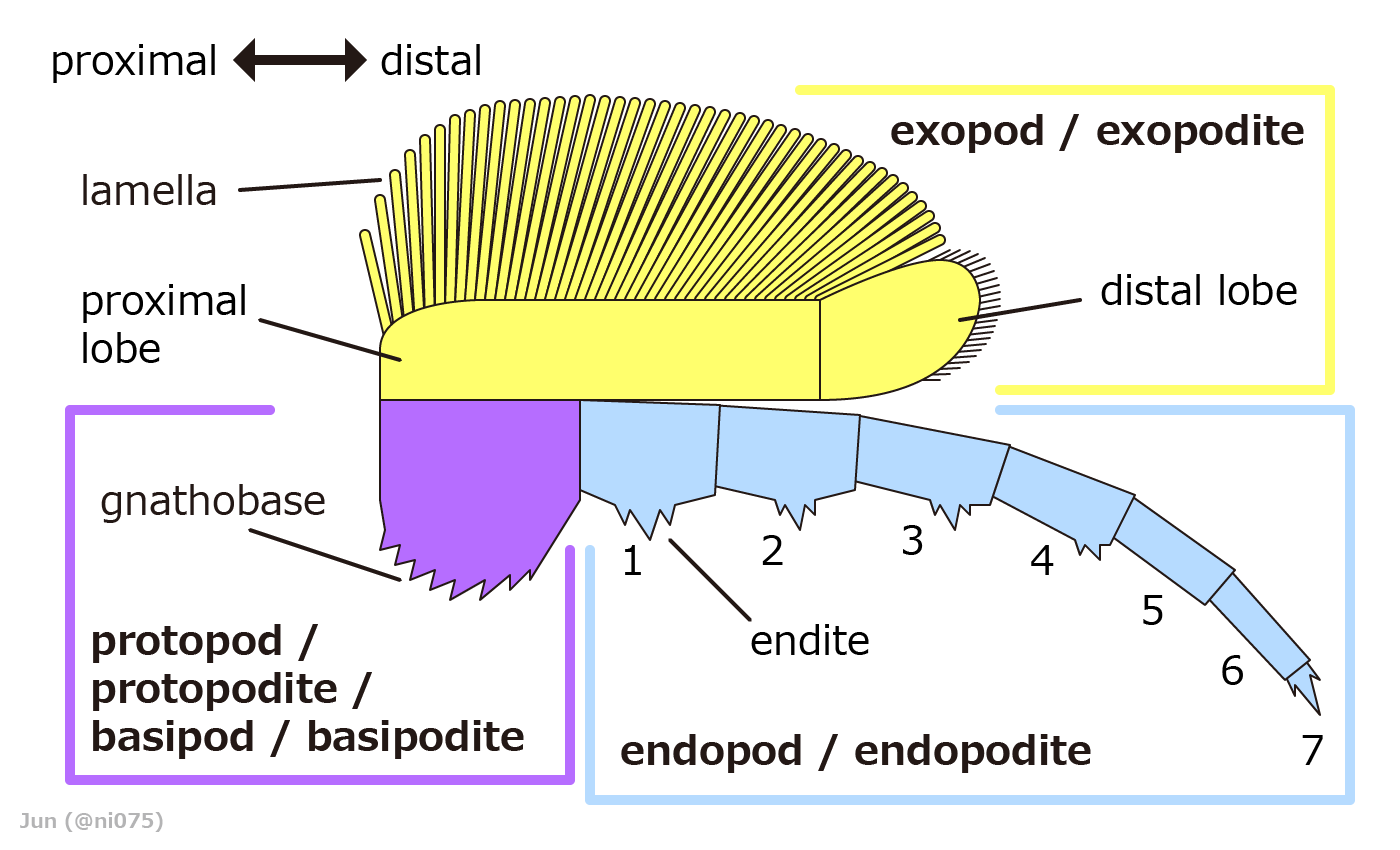
Diagram of a generalized biramous leg of a trilobite

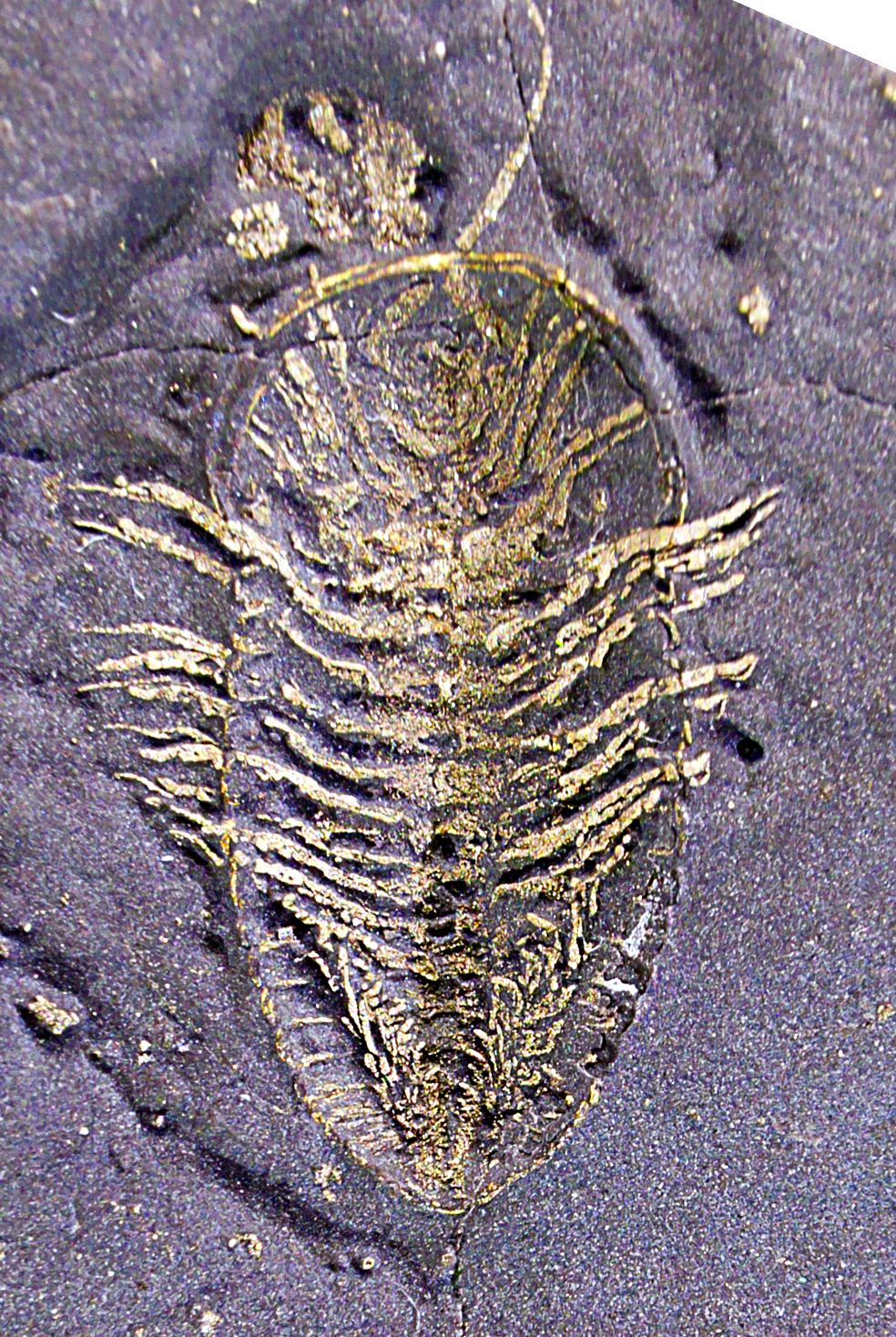
Ventral side of Triarthrus eatoni, showing antennas and biramous legs preserved in pyrite

Trilobites had a single pair of preoral antennae and otherwise undifferentiated biramous limbs (four cephalic pairs, followed by one pair per thoracic segment and some pygidium pairs). Each endopodite (walking leg) had six or seven segments, homologous to other early arthropods. Endopodites are attached to the coxa, which also bore a feather-like exopodite, or gill branch, which was used for respiration and, in some species, swimming. A 2021 study found that the upper limb branch of trilobites is a "well-developed gill" that oxygenates the hemolymph, comparable to the book gill in modern horseshoe crab Limulus. In Olenoides, the partially articulated junction with the body is distinct from the exopods of Chelicerata or Crustacea. The inside of the coxa (or gnathobase) carries spines, probably to process prey items. The last exopodite segment usually had claws or spines. Many examples of hairs on the legs suggest adaptations for feeding (as for the gnathobases) or sensory organs to help with walking.

=== Digestive tract and diet ===
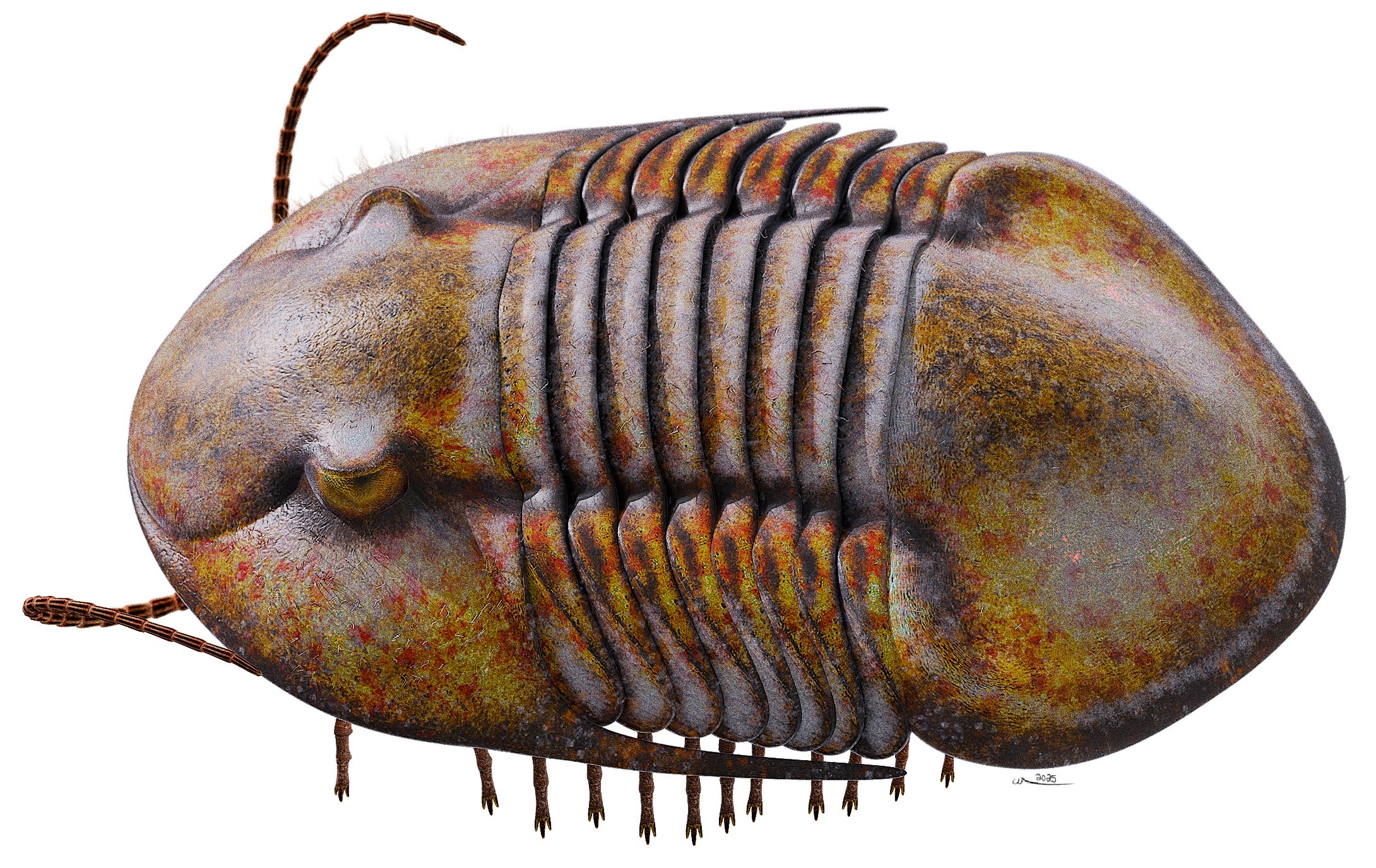
Life reconstruction of Isotelus maximus, a well known Ordovician species, and a prolific benthic predator

The toothless mouth of trilobites was situated on the rear edge of the hypostome (facing backward), in front of the legs attached to the cephalon. The mouth is linked by a small esophagus to the stomach that lay forward of the mouth, below the glabella. The "intestine" led backward from there to the pygidium. The "feeding limbs" attached to the cephalon are thought to have fed food into the mouth, possibly "slicing" the food on the hypostome and/or gnathobases first. Recent propagation phase-contrast synchrotron microtomography, or (PPC-SRμCT), which is a 3d imagining of tissue related to an organism's function, of a sample of Bohemolichas incola show large concentrations of undigestible fragments of Conchoprimitia osekensis (an ostracod), a small-shelled species now extinct, in the B. incola sample digestive tract.

The fragments are indicative of durophagous predation (shell crushing). As the composition of the shells found were not taxonomically significant, rather based on physical properties regarding the shell strength and size, B. incola was opportunistic for food classifying feeding habits to be similar to scavengers. The remains of shells address another digestive aspect of B. incola, in the enzymatic ways in which these indigestible shells were siphoned out of little nutrition leaving only fragments behind. These remnants build on the concept of early Trilobites potentially having glands that secrete enzymes that aid in the digestive process.

=== Internal organs ===
While there is direct and implied evidence for the presence and location of the mouth, stomach and digestive tract (see above) the presence of heart, brain and liver are only implied (although "present" in many reconstructions) with little direct geological evidence.

=== Musculature ===
Although rarely preserved, long lateral muscles extended from the cephalon to midway down the pygidium, attaching to the axial rings allowing enrollment while separate muscles on the legs tucked them out of the way.

== Sensory organs ==
Many trilobites had complex eyes; they also had a pair of antennae. Some trilobites were blind, probably living too deep in the sea for light to reach them. As such, they became secondarily blind in this branch of trilobite evolution. Other trilobites (e.g., Phacops rana and Erbenochile erbeni) had large eyes that were for use in well lit, predator-filled waters.

=== Antennae ===
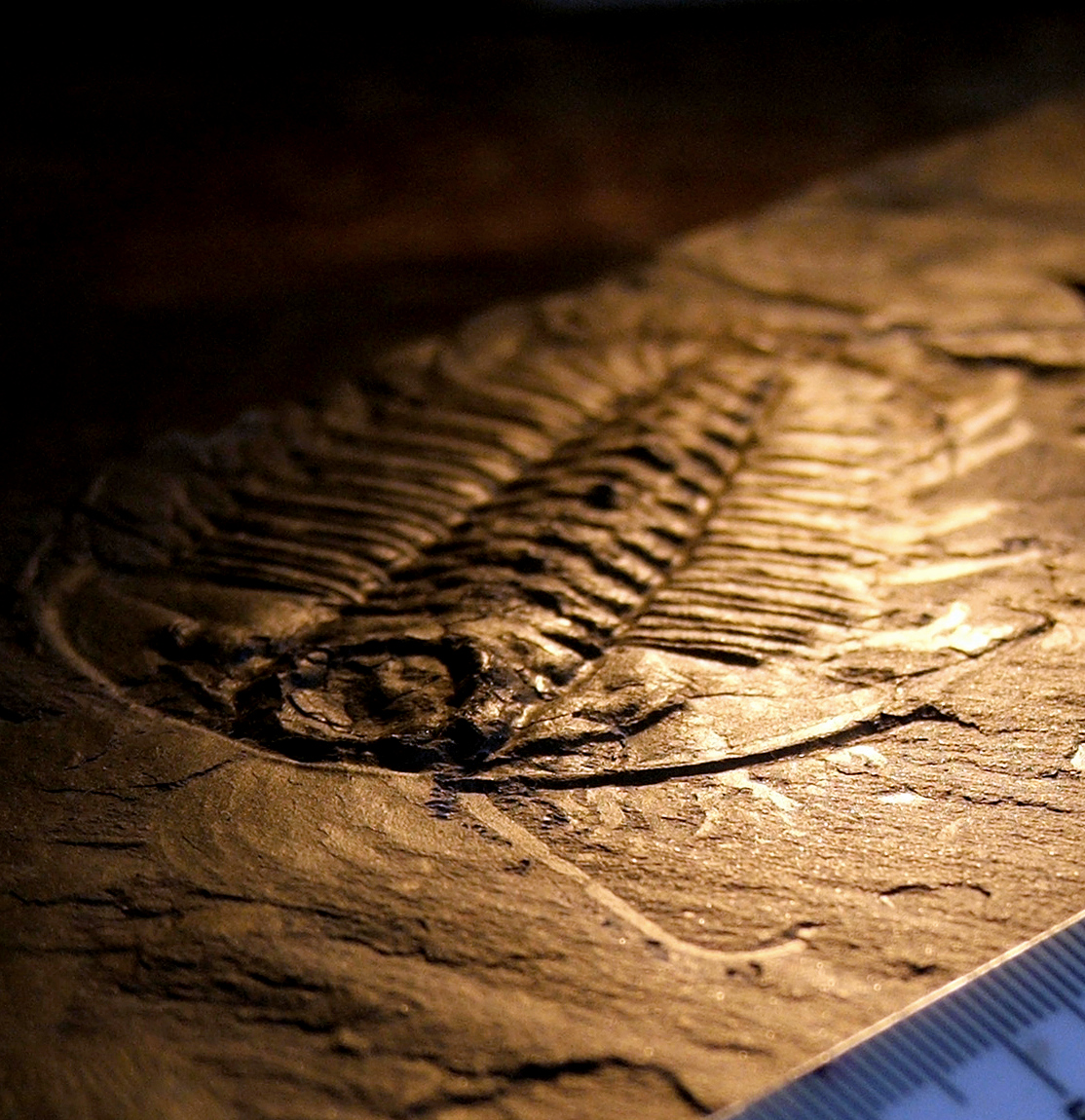
An exceptionally well preserved Olenoides serratus from the Burgess Shale. The antennae and legs are preserved as reflective carbon film.

The pair of antennae suspected in most trilobites (and preserved in a few examples) were highly flexible to allow them to be retracted when the trilobite was enrolled. One species (Olenoides serratus) preserves antenna-like cerci, which project from the rear of the trilobite.

=== Eyes ===
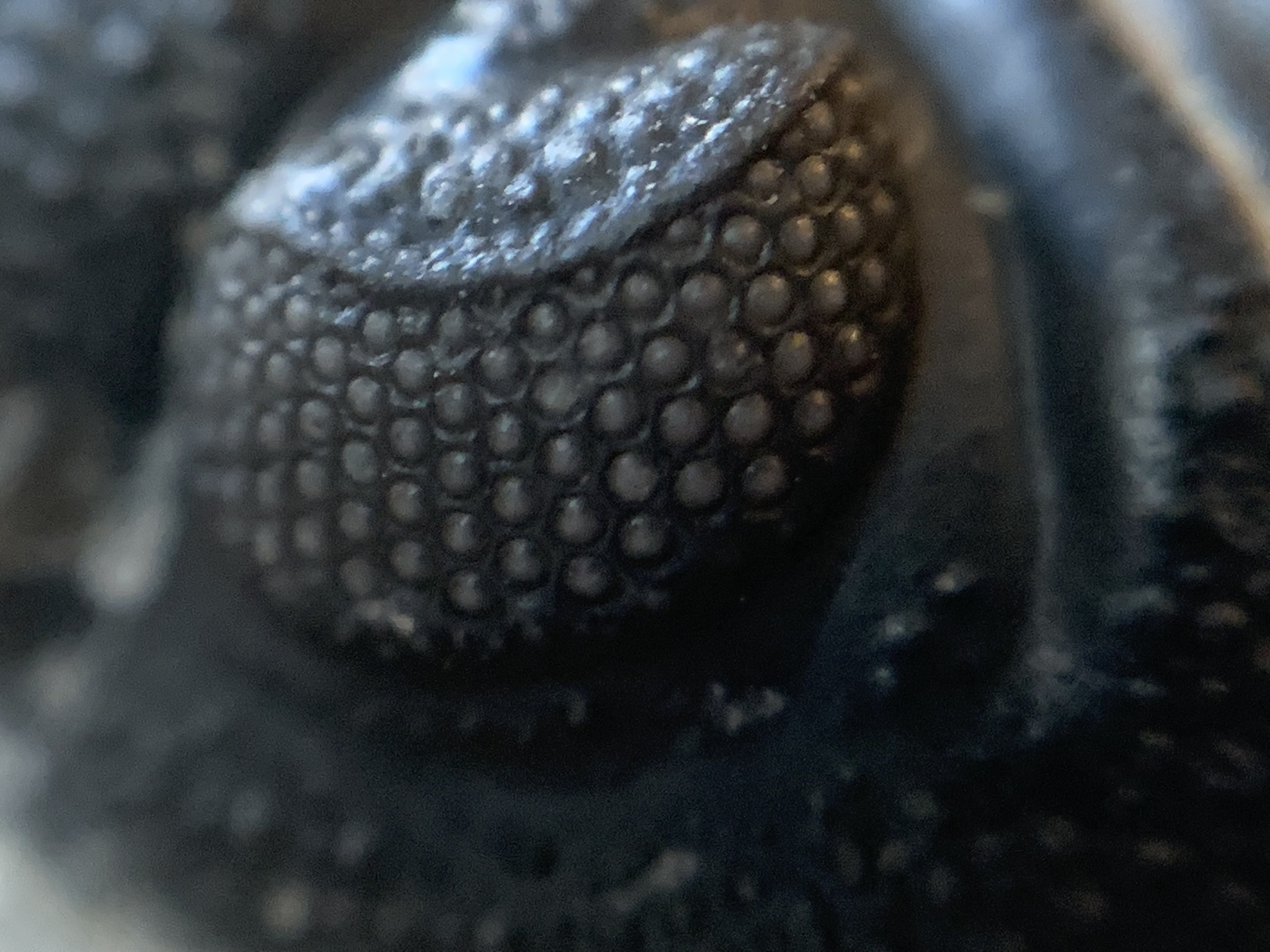
Unknown Phacops sp. eye

Even the earliest trilobites had complex, compound eyes with lenses made of calcite (a characteristic of all trilobite eyes), confirming that the eyes of arthropods and probably other animals could have developed before the Cambrian. Improving eyesight of both predator and prey in marine environments has been suggested as one of the evolutionary pressures furthering an apparent rapid development of new life forms during what is known as the Cambrian explosion.

Trilobite eyes were typically compound, with each lens being an elongated prism. The number of lenses in such an eye varied: some trilobites had only one, while some had thousands of lenses in a single eye. In compound eyes, the lenses were typically arranged hexagonally. The fossil record of trilobite eyes is complete enough that their evolution can be studied through time, which compensates to some extent for the lack of preservation of soft internal parts.

Lenses of trilobites' eyes were made of calcite (calcium carbonate, CaCO_{3}). Pure forms of calcite are transparent, and some trilobites used crystallographically oriented, clear calcite crystals to form each lens of each eye. Rigid calcite lenses would have been unable to accommodate to a change of focus like the soft lens in a human eye would; in some trilobites, the calcite formed an internal doublet structure, giving superb depth of field and minimal spherical aberration, according to optical principles discovered by French scientist René Descartes and Dutch physicist Christiaan Huygens in the 17th century. A living species with similar lenses is the brittle star Ophiocoma wendtii.

In other trilobites, with a Huygens interface apparently missing, a gradient-index lens is invoked with the refractive index of the lens changing toward the center.

Sublensar sensory structures have been found in the eyes of some phacopid trilobites. The structures consist of what appear to be several sensory cells surrounding a rhadomeric structure, resembling closely the sublensar structures found in the eyes of many modern arthropod apposition eyes, especially Limulus, a genus of horseshoe crabs.

- Holochroal eyes had a great number (sometimes over 15,000) of small (30–100 μm, rarely larger) lenses. Lenses were hexagonally close packed, touching each other, with a single corneal membrane covering all lenses. Each lens was in direct contact with adjacent lenses. Holochroal eyes are the ancestral eye of trilobites, and are by far the most common, found in all orders except the Agnostida, and through the entirety of the Trilobites' existence. Little is known of the early history of holochroal eyes; Lower and Middle Cambrian trilobites rarely preserve the visual surface. The spatial resolving power of grated eyes (such as holochroal eyes) is dependent on light intensity, circular motion, receptor density, registered light angle, and the extent to which the signal of individual rhabdoms are neurally combined. This implies that lenses need to be larger under low light conditions (such as for Pricyclopyge, when comparing it to Carolinites), and for fast moving predators and prey. As the circular velocity caused by the forward speed of an animal itself is much higher for the ommatidia directed perpendicular to the movement, fast-moving trilobites (such as Carolinites) have eyes flattened from the side and more curved were ommatia are directed to the front or back. Thus eye morphology can be used to make assumptions about the ecosystem of trilobites.
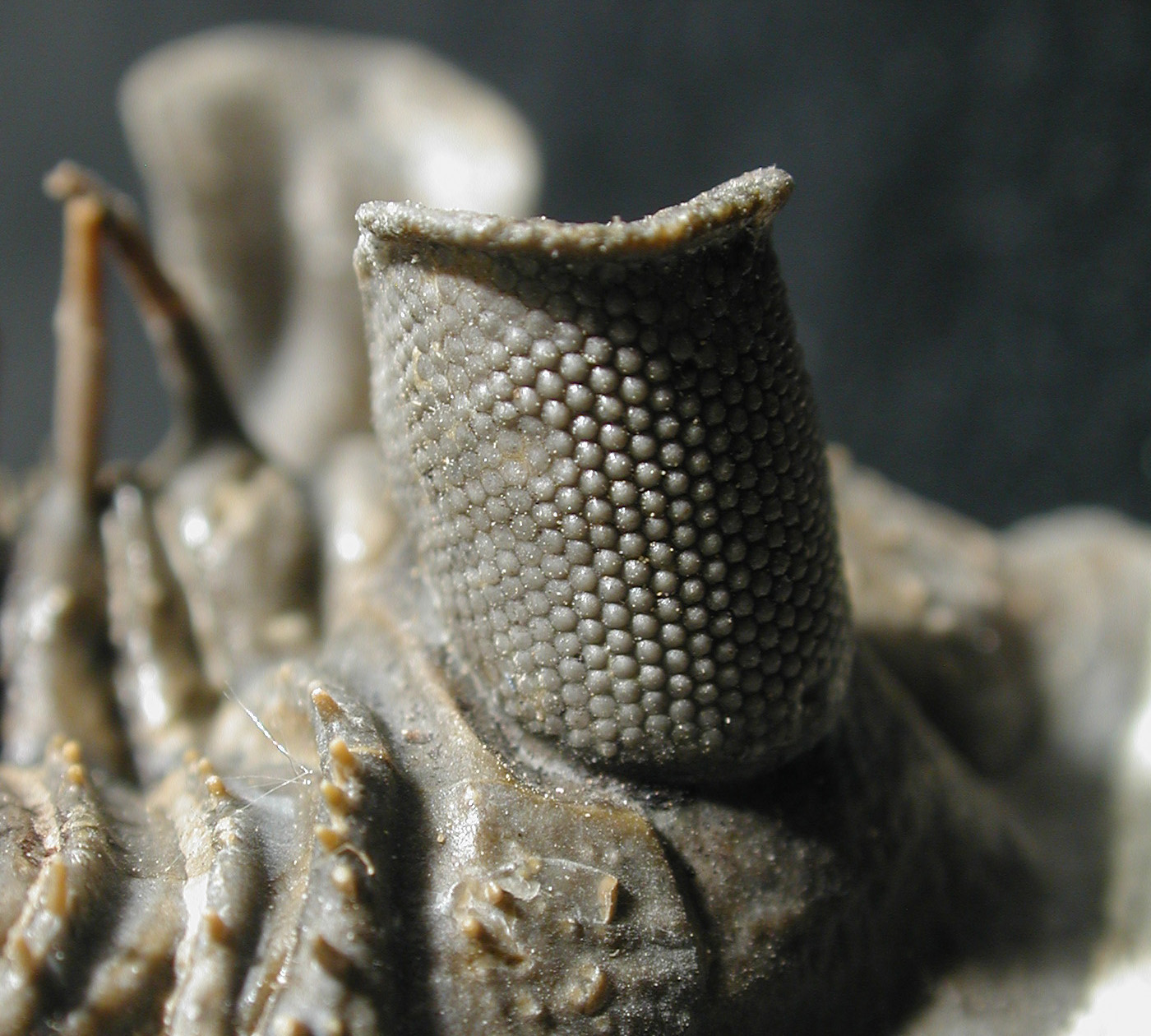
  The schizochroal eye of Erbenochile erbenii; the eye shade is unequivocal evidence that some trilobites were diurnal.
- Schizochroal eyes typically had fewer (around 700), larger lenses than holochroal eyes and are found only in Phacopina. Each lens had a cornea, and adjacent lenses were separated by thick interlensar cuticle, known as sclera. Schizochroal eyes appear quite suddenly in the early Ordovician, and were presumably derived from a holochroal ancestor. Field of view (all-around vision), eye placement and coincidental development of more efficient enrollment mechanisms point to the eye as a more defensive "early warning" system than directly aiding in the hunt for food. Modern eyes that are functionally equivalent to the schizochroal eye were not thought to exist, but are found in the modern insect species Xenos peckii.
- Abathochroal eyes are found only in Cambrian Eodiscina, and have around 70 small separate lenses that had individual cornea. The sclera was separate from the cornea, and was not as thick as the sclera in schizochroal eyes. Although well preserved examples are sparse in the early fossil record, abathochroal eyes have been recorded in the lower Cambrian, making them among the oldest known. Environmental conditions seem to have resulted in the later loss of visual organs in many Eodiscina.

Secondary blindness is not uncommon, particularly in long lived groups such as the Agnostida and Trinucleioidea. In Proetida and Phacopina from western Europe and particularly Tropidocoryphinae from France (where there is good stratigraphic control), there are well studied trends showing progressive eye reduction between closely related species that eventually leads to blindness.

Several other structures on trilobites have been explained as photo-receptors. Of particular interest are "macula", the small areas of thinned cuticle on the underside of the hypostome. In some trilobites macula are suggested to function as simple "ventral eyes" that could have detected night and day or allowed a trilobite to navigate while swimming (or turned) upside down.

=== Sensory pits ===
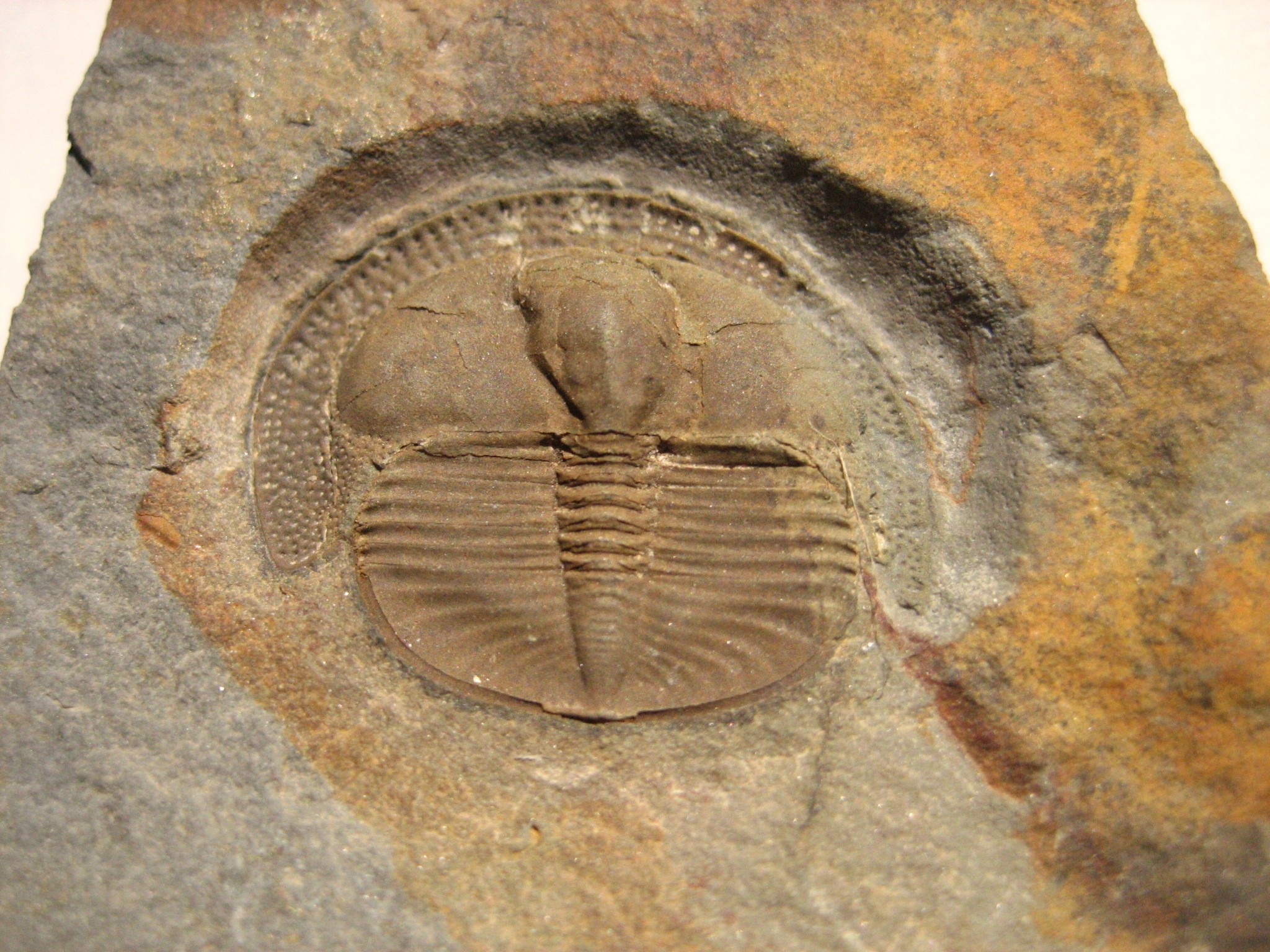
Pitted fringes on the cephalon of the trinucleoidean Lloydolithus lloydi

There are several types of prosopon that have been suggested as sensory apparatus collecting chemical or vibrational signals. The connection between large pitted fringes on the cephalon of Harpetida and Trinucleoidea with corresponding small or absent eyes makes for an interesting possibility of the fringe as a "compound ear".

== Development ==
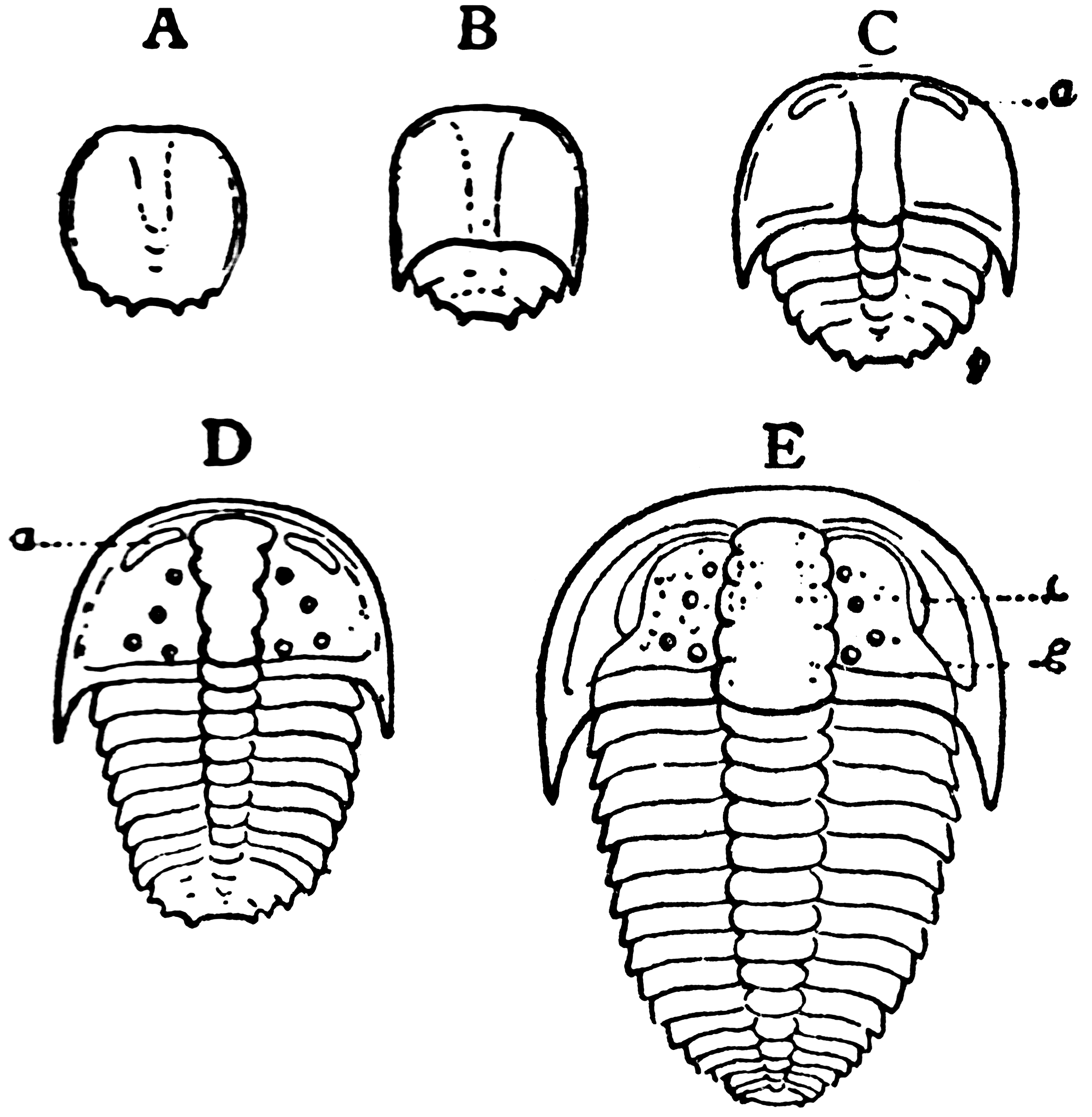
Five stages in the development of Sao hirsuta

Trilobites grew through successive moult stages called instars, in which existing segments increased in size and new trunk segments appeared at a sub-terminal generative zone during the anamorphic phase of development. This was followed by the epimorphic developmental phase, in which the animal continued to grow and moult, but no new trunk segments were expressed in the exoskeleton. The combination of anamorphic and epimorphic growth constitutes the hemianamorphic developmental mode that is common among many living arthropods.

Trilobite development was unusual in the way in which articulations developed between segments, and changes in the development of articulation gave rise to the conventionally recognized developmental phases of the trilobite life cycle (divided into three stages), which are not readily-comparable with those of other arthropods. Actual growth and change in external form of the trilobite would have occurred when the trilobite was soft shelled, following moulting and before the next exoskeleton hardened.

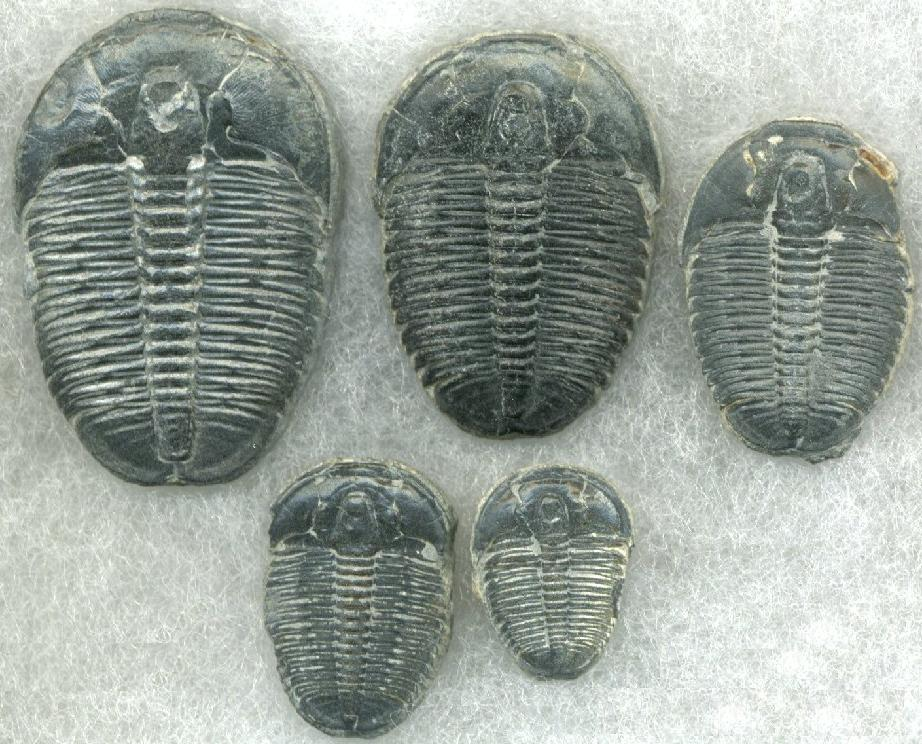
Elrathia kingii growth series with holaspids ranging from 16.2 mm to 39.8 mm in length

Trilobite larvae are known from the Cambrian to the Carboniferous and from all sub-orders. As instars from closely related taxa are more similar than instars from distantly related taxa, trilobite larvae provide morphological information important in evaluating high-level phylogenetic relationships among trilobites.

Despite the absence of supporting fossil evidence, their similarity to living arthropods has led to the belief that trilobites multiplied sexually and produced eggs. Some species may have kept eggs or larvae in a brood pouch forward of the glabella, particularly when the ecological niche was challenging to larvae. Size and morphology of the first calcified stage are highly variable between (but not within) trilobite taxa, suggesting some trilobites passed through more growth within the egg than others. Early developmental stages prior to calcification of the exoskeleton are a possibility (suggested for fallotaspids), but so is calcification and hatching coinciding.

The earliest post-embryonic trilobite growth stage known with certainty are the "protaspid" stages (anamorphic phase). Starting with an indistinguishable proto-cephalon and proto-pygidium (anaprotaspid) a number of changes occur ending with a transverse furrow separating the proto-cephalon and proto-pygidium (metaprotaspid) that can continue to add segments. Segments are added at the posterior part of the pygidium, but all segments remain fused together.

The "meraspid" stages (anamorphic phase) are marked by the appearance of an articulation between the head and the fused trunk. Prior to the onset of the first meraspid stage the animal had a two-part structure—the head and the plate of fused trunk segments, the pygidium. During the meraspid stages, new segments appeared near the rear of the pygidium as well as additional articulations developing at the front of the pygidium, releasing freely articulating segments into the thorax. Segments are generally added one per moult (although two per moult and one every alternate moult are also recorded), with number of stages equal to the number of thoracic segments. A substantial amount of growth, from less than 25% up to 30%–40%, probably took place in the meraspid stages.

The "holaspid" stages (epimorphic phase) commence when a stable, mature number of segments has been released into the thorax. Moulting continued during the holaspid stages, with no changes in thoracic segment number. Some trilobites are suggested to have continued moulting and growing throughout the life of the individual, albeit at a slower rate on reaching maturity.

Some trilobites showed a marked transition in morphology at one particular instar, which has been called "trilobite metamorphosis". Radical change in morphology is linked to the loss or gain of distinctive features that mark a change in mode of life. A change in lifestyle during development has significance in terms of evolutionary pressure, as the trilobite could pass through several ecological niches on the way to adult development and changes would strongly affect survivorship and dispersal of trilobite taxa. It is worth noting that trilobites with all protaspid stages solely planktonic and later meraspid stages benthic (e.g. asaphids) failed to last through the Ordovician extinctions, while trilobites that were planktonic for only the first protaspid stage before metamorphosing into benthic forms survived (e.g. lichids, phacopids). Pelagic larval life-style proved ill-adapted to the rapid onset of global climatic cooling and loss of tropical shelf habitats during the Ordovician.

There is no evidence that trilobites reabsorbed their exoskeletons during moulting. Some authors have argued that the failure of trilobites to reabsorb their mineralised exoskeletons when they moulted was a functional disadvantage when compared to modern arthropods that generally do reabsorb their cuticles, as it took substantially longer to reconstruct their exoskeletons, making them more vulnerable to predators.

== History of usage and research ==
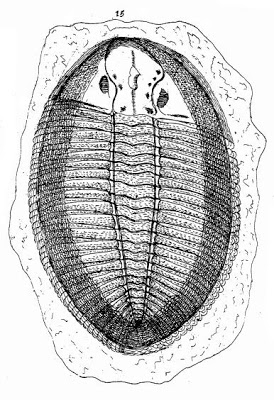
Drawing of Ogygiocarella debuchii by Rev. Edward Lhwyd, made in 1698

Rev. Edward Lhwyd published in 1698 in The Philosophical Transactions of the Royal Society, the oldest scientific journal in the English language, part of his letter "Concerning Several Regularly Figured Stones Lately Found by Him", that was accompanied by a page of etchings of fossils. One of his etchings depicted a trilobite he found near Llandeilo, probably on the grounds of Lord Dynefor's castle, he described as "the skeleton of some flat Fish".

The discovery of Calymene blumenbachii (the Dudley locust) in 1749 by Charles Lyttleton, could be identified as the beginning of trilobite research. Lyttleton submitted a letter to the Royal Society of London in 1750 concerning a "petrified insect" he found in the "limestone pits at Dudley". In 1754, Manuel Mendez da Costa proclaimed that the Dudley locust was not an insect, but instead belonged to "the crustaceous tribe of animals". He proposed to call the Dudley specimens Pediculus marinus major trilobos (large trilobed marine louse), a name which lasted well into the 19th century. German naturalist Johann Walch, who executed the first inclusive study of this group, proposed the use of the name "trilobite". He considered it appropriate to derive the name from the unique three-lobed character of the central axis and a pleural zone to each side.

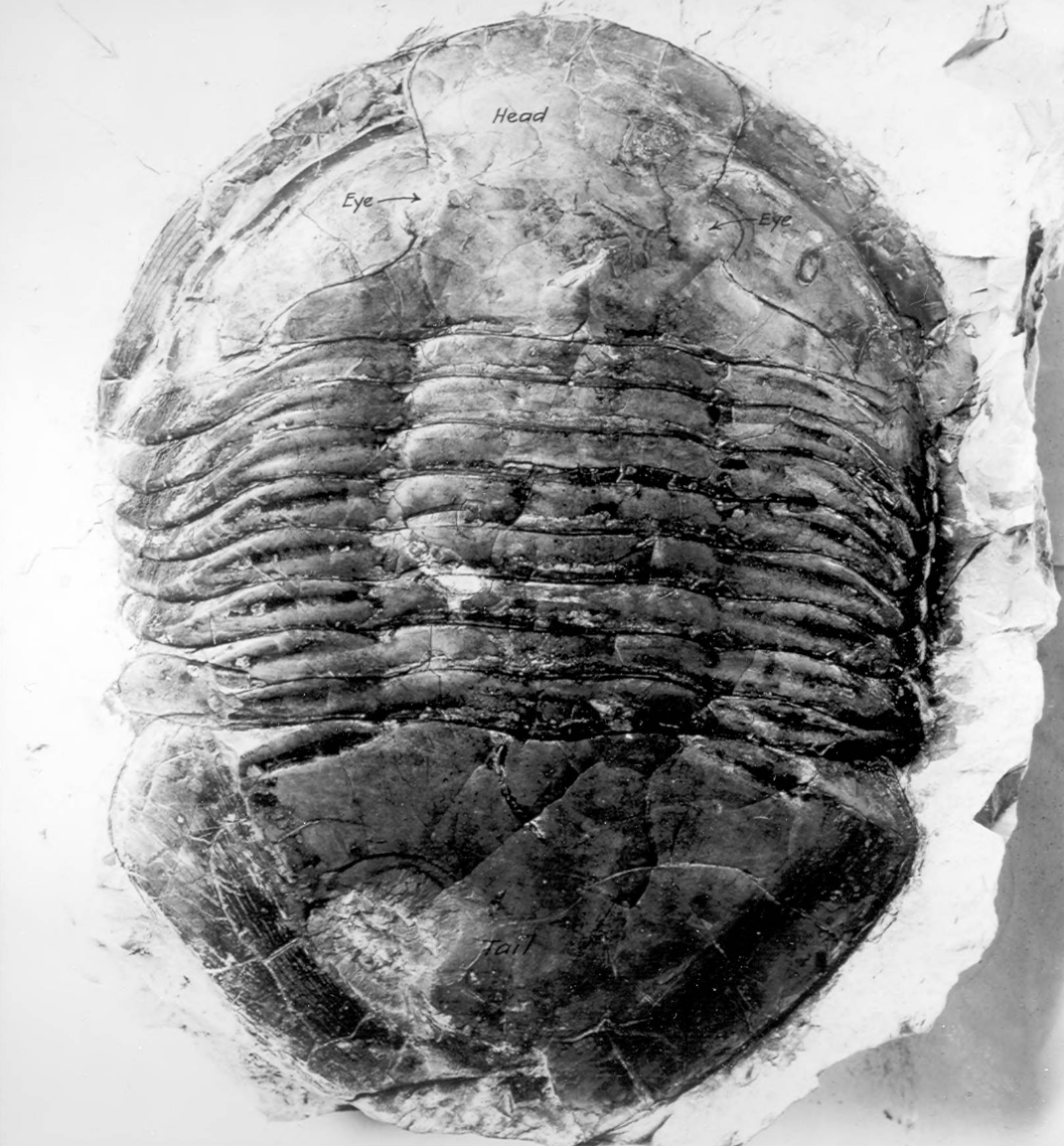
The Huffman Dam specimen, a large fossil of Isotelus maximus, and for many years considered the largest complete trilobite fossil

Written descriptions of trilobites date possibly from the third century BC and definitely from the fourth century AD. The Spanish geologists Eladio Liñán and Rodolfo Gozalo argue that some of the fossils described in Greek and Latin lapidaries as scorpion stone, beetle stone, and ant stone, refer to trilobite fossils. Less ambiguous references to trilobite fossils can be found in Chinese sources. Fossils from the Kushan formation of northeastern China were prized as inkstones and decorative pieces.

In the New World, American fossil hunters found plentiful deposits of Elrathia kingi in western Utah in the 1860s. Until the early 1900s, the Ute Native Americans of Utah wore these trilobites, which they called pachavee (little water bug), as amulets. A hole was bored in the head and the fossil was worn on a string. According to the Ute themselves, trilobite necklaces protect against bullets and diseases such as diphtheria. In 1931, Frank Beckwith uncovered evidence of the Ute use of trilobites. Travelling through the badlands, he photographed two petroglyphs that most likely represent trilobites. On the same trip he examined a burial, of unknown age, with a drilled trilobite fossil lying in the chest cavity of the interred. Since then, trilobite amulets have been found all over the Great Basin, as well as in British Columbia and Australia.

In the 1880s, archaeologists discovered in the Grotte du Trilobite (Caves of Arcy-sur-Cure, Yonne, France) a much-handled trilobite fossil that had been drilled as if to be worn as a pendant. The occupation stratum in which the trilobite was found has been dated as 15,000 years old. Because the pendant was handled so much, the species of trilobite cannot be determined. This type of trilobite is not found around Yonne, so it may have been highly prized and traded from elsewhere.

== See also ==
- History of life
- Isopoda
- List of trilobite genera
- Notostraca
- Triops

== Bibliography ==
- Fortey, Richard (2000), Trilobite: Eyewitness to Evolution, New York: Vintage Books, ISBN 978-0-375-70621-9
- Lawrence, Pete (2014), Trilobites of the World: An atlas of 1000 photographs, Manchester: Siri Scientific Press, ISBN 978-0-9574530-3-6, archived from the original on 2014-03-08
- Levi-Setti, Riccardo (2014), The Trilobite Book: A Visual Journey, Chicago: University of Chicago Press, Bibcode:2014tbvj.book.....L, ISBN 978-0-226-12441-4
