= Bruce S. Lieberman =

American paleontologist (born 1966)

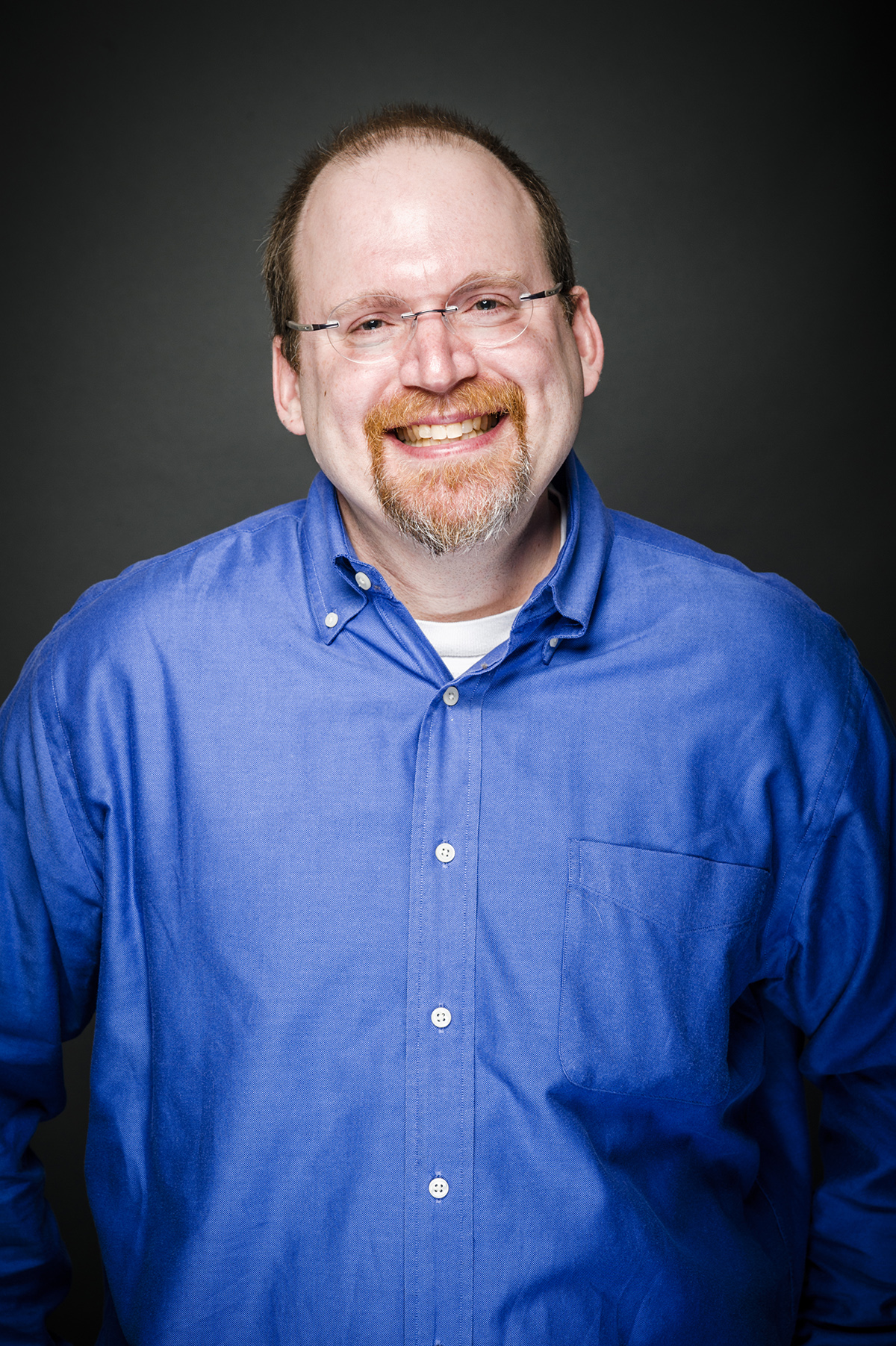
- Bruce S. Lieberman
- Born: 1966 (age 59–60); New York City, U.S.
- Education: Harvard University (BA); Columbia University (PhD)
- Awards: Charles Schuchert Award
- Scientific career
- Fields: Paleontology, Macroevolution, Paleoecology, Biogeography
- Workplaces: University of Kansas
- Academic advisors: Niles Eldredge, Stephen Jay Gould, Elisabeth Vrba, Andrew Knoll
- Notable students: Alycia Stigall, Erin Saupe

Bruce Smith Lieberman (born in 1966 in New York City) is an American paleontologist.

== Education and career ==
Lieberman received his B.A., summa cum laude and Phi Beta Kappa, in 1988 from Harvard University, where Stephen Jay Gould was his undergraduate advisor. He then received a master's degree in 1991 and a doctorate in 1994 from Columbia University, where Niles Eldredge was his graduate advisor.

During graduate school he was based at the American Museum of Natural History. He did a 2-year post-doctoral fellowship with Elisabeth Vrba at Yale University and a 2-year post-doctoral fellowship with Andrew Knoll at Harvard University. Since 1998 he has been on the faculty at the University of Kansas where he is Dean's Professor in the Department of Ecology & Evolutionary Biology, and a Senior Curator in the University of Kansas Natural History Museum & Biodiversity Institute. He is also Director of the Paleontological Institute and editor-in-chief of the Treatise on Invertebrate Paleontology. He spent a year serving as a program officer at the National Science Foundation.

His research focuses on macroevolution, and he has considered various topics in this area including support for punctuated equilibrium and the related issue of mechanisms causing stasis, the evidence for species selection, the difference between microevolution and macroevolution, the status of the Red Queen hypothesis, the prevalence of interspecific competition in macroevolution, the relationship between evolutionary volatility, volatility in stock prices, and the rate of star formation, and the nature of evolutionary radiations. Other topics he has considered in his research include mass extinctions, trilobites, the Cambrian explosion, paleoecology, phylogenetics, Burgess Shale-type faunas, and biogeography, the latter incorporating the application of both phylogenetic and species distribution modelling based approaches to paleobiogeography. He has been involved with the digitization of invertebrate paleontology natural history collections, including helping to develop apps for fossil identification. In 2002 he received the Charles Schuchert Award from the Paleontological Society. Graduate students advised by him include Alycia Stigall, Erin Saupe, and Cori Myers. Post-doctoral scholars advised by him include Luke Strotz, Michelle Casey, Jonathan Hendricks, Claudia Nunez-Penichet, Rachel Moore, and Rhi LaVine.

== Books authored ==
1. B. S. Lieberman. 2000. Paleobiogeography: Using Fossils to Study Global Change, Plate Tectonics, and Evolution. Plenum Press/Kluwer Academic Publishers, New York.
2. B. S. Lieberman and R. L. Kaesler. 2010. Prehistoric Life: Evolution and the Fossil Record. Wiley-Blackwell Scientific, Oxford, UK.
3. E. O. Wiley and B. S. Lieberman. 2011. Phylogenetics: Theory and Practice of Phylogenetic Systematics, 2nd edition. Wiley-Blackwell, Hoboken, NJ.
4. B. S. Lieberman and N. Eldredge. 2024. Macroevolutionaries: Reflections on Natural History, Paleontology, and Stephen Jay Gould. Columbia University Press, New York.

== Partial list of Trilobite genera named and revised ==
Bellacartwrightia Lieberman & Kloc, 1997 – a Devonian trilobite (Acastidae) from North America; Aayemenatcheia Lieberman, 1994; Acastava; Actinopeltis; Ammagnostus; Amphoton; Archaeaspis; Basidechenella; Biceratops; Bolbolenellus; Bondonella; Bouleia; Bradyfallotaspis; Breizhops; Bristolia; Brongniartella; Callavia; Calymenella; Cambropallas; Cirquella; Chondranomocare; Colpocoryphe; Coltraneia Lieberman & Kloc, 1997; Cornuproetus; Crassiproetus; Daguinaspis; Dechenella; Deiphon; Dorypyge; Eccoptochile; Eldredgeia; Elliptocephala; Fallotaspidella; Fallotaspis; Fremontella; Fritzolenellus Lieberman, 1998; Gabriellus; Geraldinella; Gerastos; Greenops; Hedstroemia; Holmia; Judomiella; Kawina; Kayserops; Kjerulfia; Kootenia; Laudonia; Lemdadella; Liopeishania; Lochmanolenellus; Malvinella; Mesolenellus; Mesonacis; Metacryphaeus; Milesdavis Lieberman, 1994 – a Devonian trilobite (Proetidae) from Bohemia; Mummaspis; Nelsonia; Neltneria; Nephrolenellus; Nevadia; Nevadella; Olenelloides; Olenellus; Paedumias; Palmettaspis; Palpebrops; Parabouleia; Peachella; Penarosa; Poriagraulos; Proetus; Profallotaspis; Pseudojudomia; Repinella; Schmidtiellus; Schopfaspis; Solenopleura; Sphaerexochus; Sphaerocoryphe; Suludella;Tolkienia Lieberman & Kloc, 1997 – a Devonian trilobite (Acastidae); Trimerus; Wanneria.

== Partial list of taxa from Burgess Shale-type faunas studied ==
Anomalocaris; Branchiocaris; Canadaspis; Chancelloriidae; Coronatae; Herpetogaster; Hurdia; Medusozoa; Narcomedusae; Ottoia; Perspicaris; Semaeostomeaea; Sidneyia; Siphusauctum; Skeemella; Tripedalia;Tuzoia
