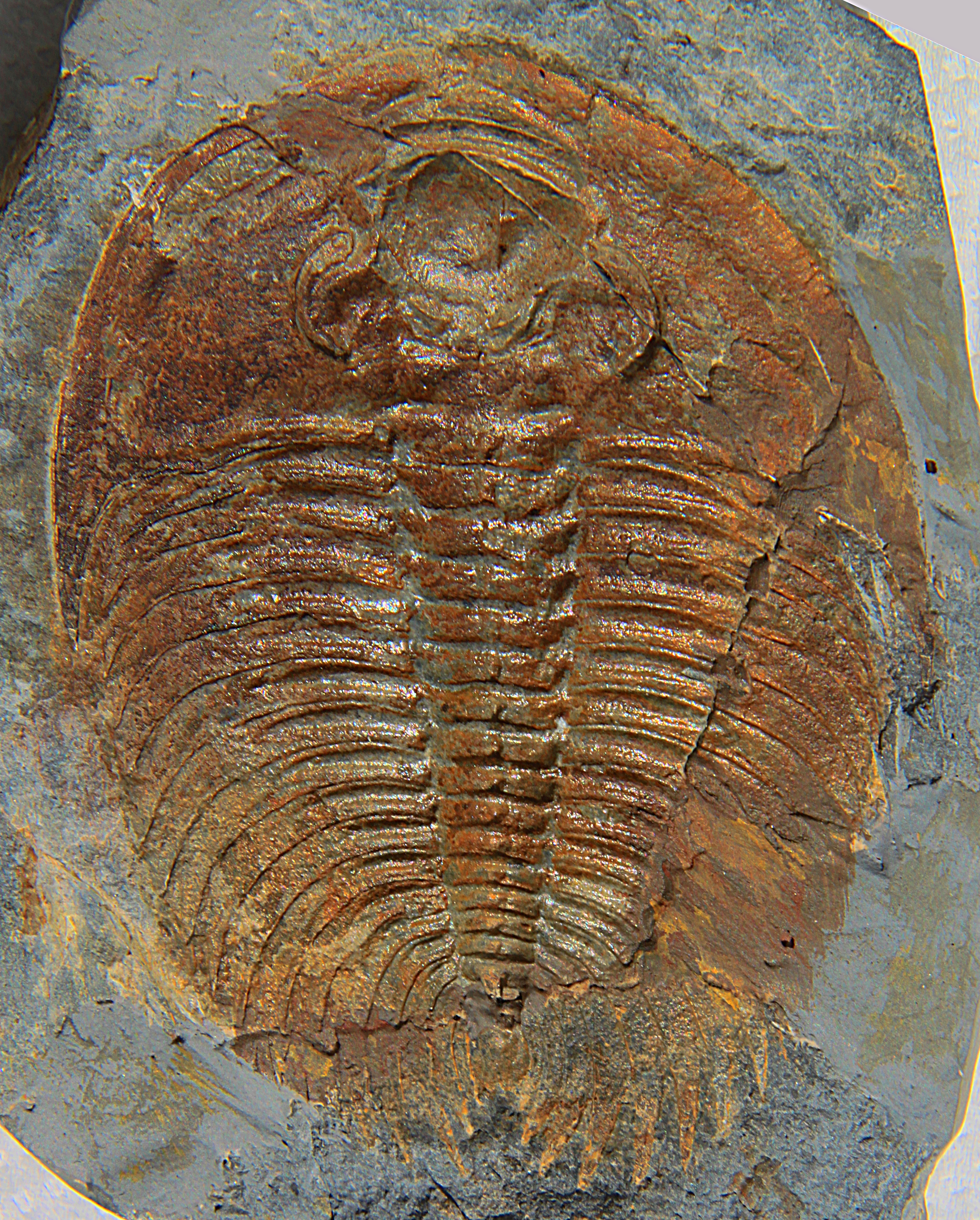
- A Wanneria walcottana negative imprint, from the Kinzers Shale

Scientific classification
- Kingdom: Animalia
- Phylum: Arthropoda
- Class: Trilobita
- Order: Redlichiida
- Suborder: Olenellina
- Superfamily: Olenelloidea
- Family: Wanneriidae
- Genus: †Wanneria Walcott, 1910

Type species
- †Wanneria walcottana (Wanner, 1901)

Other species
- †W. cranbrookense Webster in Webster & Caron, 2024

Synonyms
- Olenellus (Holmia) walcottanus

= Wanneria =

Wanneria Temporal range: late Lower Cambrian (middle Upper Olenellus-zone) 524–518.5 Ma

Wanneria is an extinct genus from a well-known class of fossil marine arthropods, the trilobites. It lived during the later part of the Botomian stage, which lasted from approximately 524 to 518.5 million years ago. This faunal stage was part of the Cambrian Period. W. walcottana and W. cranbrookense are the only known species in this genus.

== Description ==
As with most early trilobites, Wanneria walcottana has an almost flat exoskeleton, that is only thinly calcified, and has crescent-shaped eye ridges. As part of the Olenellina suborder, Wanneria lacks dorsal sutures. Like all other members of the Olenelloidea superfamily, the eye-ridges spring from the back of the frontal lobe (L4) of the central area of the cephalon, that is called glabella. The dorsal exoskeleton of Wanneria has an inverted egg shaped outline, approximately 1½ times longer than wide, ignoring the pleural spines, and is at its widest at the back of the cephalon. The horizontal outline of the head (or cephalon) is semi-circular with the back (or posterior margin) perpendicular to the midline or somewhat arching backwards. The L4 is wider than the other lobes, and touches the raised ridge (or anterior border) at the front of the cephalon. The right and left furrow (S1) between the first (L1) and second (L2) pair of side lobes (counted from the back of the cephalon) do not join across the midline, and angle forwards from the middle to the side. The sickle shaped eyes are attached to the back of L4 and extend backwards to the most backward set of side-lobes of the glabella (or L1). The rim of the cephalon is extended into backward pointing genal spines, that reach back to approximately the 4th thorax segment. Its body (or thorax) has 17 segments, with nodes on thorax segments 1 to 14, and a short spine on segment 15 that is at its base about ¼ as wide as the axis. The axis is about ¼ as wide as the thorax. Unlike in the majority of the Olenelloidea, in Wanneria thorax segment 3 is not macro-pleural, but equal in size and shape to neighboring segments. Pleural spines slightly arched backwards, extending sideward in the most frontal thorax segments, but gradually more backward and eventually even arching slightly inward in segment 17.

== Distribution ==
Wanneria walcottana occurs in the middle Upper Olenellus-zone of Pennsylvania (Kinzers Formation, road metal quarry and walls of demolished tenant house on Noah L. Getz farm, on Harrisburg Pike, 1 mile (1.6 km) north of Rohrerstown, about 2.5 miles (4 km) west of Lancaster, Lancaster County, 40°0′N 76°42′W), of Nevada (Harkless Formation, North-East of Goldpoint, Dyeran, Esmeralda County, 37°24′N 117°24′W), Mexico (Buelna Formation, Cerro Rajon, Caborca Region, 30°24′N 111°54′W) and of Greenland.

Wanneria cranbrookense only occurs in the Eager Formation of British Columbia, Canada.

== Taxonomy ==
=== Relationship within the Olenellidae ===
Wanneria is close to the common ancestor of the Holmiidae, and of the clade comprising Fritzolenellus, Mummaspis, Laudonia, the Biceratopsinae and the Bristoliinae. So far, cladistic analysis could not determine which two of these groups are closer. This large group together is the sister group to Elliptocephala.

=== Species previously assigned to Wanneria ===
- W. halli = Fremontella halli
- W. jaquetti p. 74-75, pl. VI, fig. 5 = Neltneria jaquetti
- W. jaquetti p. 74-75, pl. VI, fig. 1-4 = Bondonella typica
- W. logani = Elliptocephala logani
- W. lundgreni = Elliptocephala lundgreni
- W. macer = Mummaspis macer
- W. mediocris = Elliptocephala mediocris
- W. mexicana prima = Lochmanolenellus mexicana
- W. occidens = Mummaspis occidens
- W. mirabilis = Elliptocephala mirabilis
- W. parvifrons = Elliptocephala parvifrons
- W. ruginosa = Elliptocephala mediocris
- W. subglabra = Elliptocephala mediocris
- W. troelseni = Elliptocephala mediocris
- W. walcottanus = Mummaspis macer
