= Elliptocephala =

Elliptocephala Temporal range: late Lower Cambrian (Upper Tommotian to Upper Botonian) 531–518.5 Ma

Scientific classification
- Kingdom: Animalia
- Phylum: Arthropoda
- Class: Trilobita
- Order: Redlichiida
- Superfamily: Olenelloidea
- Family: Wanneriidae
- Genus: Elliptocephala Emmons, 1844

Species
- E. asaphoides Emmons, 1844 (Type); E. bicensis (Walcott, 1910) synonym Callavia bicensis; E. laxocules (Fritz, 1972) synonym Olenellus laxocules; E. logani (Walcott, 1910) synonyms Olenellus logani, Wanneria logani; E. lundgreni (Moberg, 1892) synonyms Wanneria lundgreni, Kjerulfia lundgreni, Holmia lundgreni; E. mediocris (Poulsen, 1958) synonyms Wanneria mediocris, W. ruginosa, W. subglabra, W. troelseni; E. mirabilis (Poulsen, 1958) synonyms Holmia mirabilis, Wanneria mirabilis; E. paraoculus (Fritz, 1972) synonym Olenellus paraoculus; E. parvifrons (Fritz, 1972) synonym Wanneria parvifrons; E. praenuntius (Cowie, 1968) synonym Olenellus praenuntius; E. sequomalus (Fritz, 1972) synonym Olenellus sequomalus; E. walcotti Lieberman, 1999 synonym Olenellus truemanni pro parte

Elliptocephala is an extinct genus from a well-known class of fossil marine arthropods, the trilobites. It lived from the later part of the Tommotian (upper Schmidtiellus mickwitzi-zone) to the upper Botomian (early middle Olenellus-zone). Elliptocephala can easily be confused with Ellipsocephalus, a trilobite genus of the Ptychopariida order.

== Etymology ==
The species E. walcotti was named in honor of Charles Doolittle Walcott, a renowned early paleontologist, that described many trilobite species.

== Taxonomy ==
=== Relations within Elliptocephala ===
According to Lieberman E. sequomalus is an early species, close to the common ancestor of the genus. The rest of the species fall into two distinct groups. The first consists of the closely related E. bicensis and E. asaphoides, with E. walcotti and twin species E. praenuntius slightly less close and E. mediocris near the basis of this group. The second group consisting of the closely related E. mirabilis and E. lundgreni, with E. logani and E. parvifrons slightly further removed, followed by E. paraoculus, and E. laxocules near the basis of this second group.

=== Relationship within the Olenelloidea ===
Elliptocephala is the sistergroup of the clade comprising Wanneria walcottana, the Holmiidae, Fritzolenellus, Mummaspis, Laudonia, the Biceratopsinae and the Bristoliinae. Including Elliptocephala, this clade is the sistergroup of the Olenellidae.

== Distribution ==
- E. asaphoides was collected in the Middle Olenellus-zone of eastern New York State (Greenwich Formation).
- E. bicensis is found in Quebec, Canada and believed to be from the Olenellus-zone (limestone boulder found in a conglomerate that has probably formed during the Lower Ordovician).
- E. laxocules occurs in the Middle Olenellus-zone of the Northwest Territories (type section of the type section of the Sekwi Formation, 0.2 miles Southeast of June Lake, Mackenzie Mountains).
- E. logani was excavated from the Middle Olenellus-zone of the Northwest Territories (type section of the type section of the Sekwi Formation, 0.2 miles Southeast of June Lake, Mackenzie Mountains, and the Illtyd Formation, Wernecke Mountains).
- E. lundgreni is present in
- E. mediocris was collected in Northwestern Greenland, questionably from the Olenellus-zone (Wulff River Formation, Marshall Bugt, Inglefield Land).
- E. mirabilis is found in Northwestern Greenland, questionably from the Olenellus-zone (Wulff River Formation, Marshall Bugt, Inglefield Land).
- E. paraoculus is present in the Middle Olenellus-zone of the Northwest Territories (type section of the type section of the Sekwi Formation, 0.2 miles Southeast of June Lake, Mackenzie Mountains).
- E. parvifrons was excavated from the Middle Olenellus-zone of the Northwest Territories (type section of the type section of the Sekwi Formation, 0.2 miles Southeast of June Lake, Mackenzie Mountains, and the Illtyd Formation, Wernecke Mountains).
- E. praenuntius occurs on the eastern Ellesmere Island, Canada, in what possibly belongs to the Lower Olenellus-zone (430 feet above the basis of the Kane Formation, 6 miles Northwest of the head of Scoresby Bay).
- E. sequomalus is found in the Middle Olenellus-zone of the Northwest Territories (type section of the type section of the Sekwi Formation, 0.2 miles Southeast of June Lake, Mackenzie Mountains).
- E. walcotti was collected in the Middle Olenellus-zone of the Northwest Territories (type section of the type section of the Sekwi Formation.

== Description ==
As with most early trilobites, Elliptocephala has an almost flat exoskeleton, that is only thinly calcified, and has crescent-shaped eye ridges. As part of the Olenellina suborder, Elliptocephala lacks dorsal sutures. Like all other members of the Olenelloidea superfamily, the eye-ridges spring from the back of the frontal lobe (L4) of the central area of the cephalon, that is called glabella. The head shield (or cephalon) of Ellipticephala carries backwards directed spines at the corner between the halfcircle shaped frontal and side margin and the backmargin that is roughly perpendicular to the midline. The frontal lobe of the glabella (L4) is roughly 1½× the length of the backward ring-shaped lobe (also called occipital ring or L0) and the most backward set of side lobes (L1) taken together, measured along the midline (or sagittally). L4 is also much wider than L0. Side lobes L2 and L3 do not merge with each other. The line between the backward tip of eye lobe and the junction of the back margin of lobe with glabella with the midline is 10-20°. L3 touches the eye ridge. L0 carries a node at the midline. The third thorax segment from the front (T3) is not larger than the neighboring segments and does not carry larger spines. Thoracic pleural furrows extend onto spines. Long backward directed spine on the midline of T15, and this spine is broad at its base.
