= Bolbolenellus =

Bolbolenellus Temporal range: Toyonian (Upper Olenellus-zone) 516–513 Ma

Scientific classification
- Kingdom: Animalia
- Phylum: Arthropoda
- Clade: †Artiopoda
- Class: †Trilobita
- Order: †Redlichiida
- Family: †Biceratopsidae
- Subfamily: †Biceratopsinae
- Genus: †Bolbolenellus; Palmer & Repina, 1993

Species
- B. euryparia (Palmer, 1979) (Type), synonyms Olenellus euryparia, O. fremonti pro parte; B. altifrons (Fritz, 1972) , synonym Olenellus altifrons; B. brevispinus Palmer, 1998; B. groenlandicus (Poulsen, 1927), synonyms Olenellus groenlandicus, O. kentensis, Bristolia groenlandicus, Bristolia kentensis; B. hermani (Kindle & Tasch, 1948), synonyms Olenellus hermani, Esmeraldina hermani; B. sphaerulosus (Fritz, 1991), synonyms Olenellus sphaerulosus, O. bufrontis

Extinct genus of trilobites

Bolbolenellus is an extinct genus of trilobites, fossil marine arthropods, with five species attributed to it currently. It can be easily distinguished from all other trilobites by the combination of the absence of dorsal sutures in the head shield like all Olenellina (which in all other trilobite suborders assist in moulding by splitting open), and a distinctly bulbous frontal lobe (L4) of the raised axial area in the head (or cephalon) called glabella. The species lived at the end of the Lower Cambrian.

== Etymology ==
Bolbolenellus is the combination of Greek βολβός (bolbos, “plant with round swelling on underground stem”), and Olenellus, the rather distantly related genus to which all of the species were previously assigned. This refers to the bulb-like swelling of the frontal lobe of the glabella. The names of the species have the following derivations.

- B. altifrons from the Latin altus (“high”) and from Latin frons (“forehead”), to express the species has a bulbous frontal glabellar lobe.
- B. brevispinus from brevis the Latin word for "short" and spinus the Latin word for "spine".
- B. groenlandicus is named for Greenland, where the species occurs.
- B. sphaerulosus from the Latin sphaerula (small ball).

== Description ==
As with most early trilobites, Bolbolenellus has an only thinly calcified exoskeleton. Although most of the body is rather flat, the frontal lobe (L4) of the central area of the cephalon (or glabella) is prominent, bulbous (or subglobular), and may overlap the border at the front in dorsal view. It also shares crescent-shaped eye ridges, but these rise above the exoskeleton. As part of the Olenellina suborder, Bolbolenellus lacks dorsal sutures. Like all other members of the Olenelloidea superfamily, the eye-ridges spring from the back of the frontal lobe (L4) of the glabella. The posterior margin of cephalon is nearly straight or angles to the front (anterolaterally) on the outside of the intergenal spine or intergenal angle. The short genal spine protrudes opposite or posterior to the most backward side lobe of the glabella (or L1). There may be an intergenal spine. The frontal lobe of the glabella touches the border of the cephalon (or the preglabellar field is absent). The most backward tips of eye ridges (or ocular lobes) are approximately opposite occipital furrow. Although the third thorax) segment (or T3, this is counted from the headshield to the tailshield) has strongly enlarged side lobes (or pleurae), the spine on their end is not much enlarged compared to the spines of neighboring segments. The 14th segment carries a backward pointing axial spine that is approximately as long as the thorax axis. There seems to be no opistothorax.

=== Differences with some other Biceratopsinae ===
Most other Biceratopsinae, i.e. Biceratops nevadensis, Emigrantia and Peachella and to a lesser extend Eopeachella have effaced cephalic features. Biceratops lacks genal spines. In Emigrantia the genal spines are longer than the cephalon and attach halfway down its side (or lateral margin). Peachella has club-like genal spines. In Nephrolenellus the eye ridges extend outwards, the second pair of side lobes of the glabella are very narrow, the genal spines attach further to the front of the cephalon, T3 carries massive pleural spines, the axial spine on T14 is absent, and there is a prominent opistothorax.

=== Relations with other Biceratopsinae ===
The closest relative of the six species of Bolbolenellus is the genus Nephrolenellus. The other genera of the Biceratopsinae (Biceratops, Emigrantia, Eopeachella, Peachella, and Olenelloides) constitute the sister group.

== Distribution ==
- B. euryparia is present in the Upper Olenellus-zone of California (lower half of the B. euryparia-subzone of the Carrara Formation, Eagle Mountain, White-Inyo Mountains, and the middle part of the Latham Shale, East slope of hill 1440 in the southern end of the Marble Mountains, San Bernardino County).
- B. altifrons occurs in the Middle Olenellus-zone of the Northwest Territories (type section of the type section of the Sekwi Formation, 0.2 miles Southeast of June Lake, Mackenzie Mountains).
- B. brevispinus has been collected in the Upper Olenellus-zone of Nevada (near Oak Spring Summit, Pioche Formation, Lincoln County).
- B. groenlandicus is found in Northwestern Greenland, questionably from the Upper Olenellus-zone (Wulff River Formation, Marshall Bugt, Inglefield Land).
- B. hermani occurs in the Upper Olenellus-zone of Vermont (Monkton Quartzite, near Clay and Red Rock Points on Lake Champlain, and Parker Slate, 2 miles west of Georgia Centre), of California (White|Inyo Mountain region)
- B. sphaerulosus has been collected in the Olenellus-zone of the Yukon Territory, Canada (Unit 6 of the Upper Illtyd Formation, Wernecke Mountains).

== Habitat ==
Bolbolenellus was probably a marine bottom dweller, like all Olenellina.
