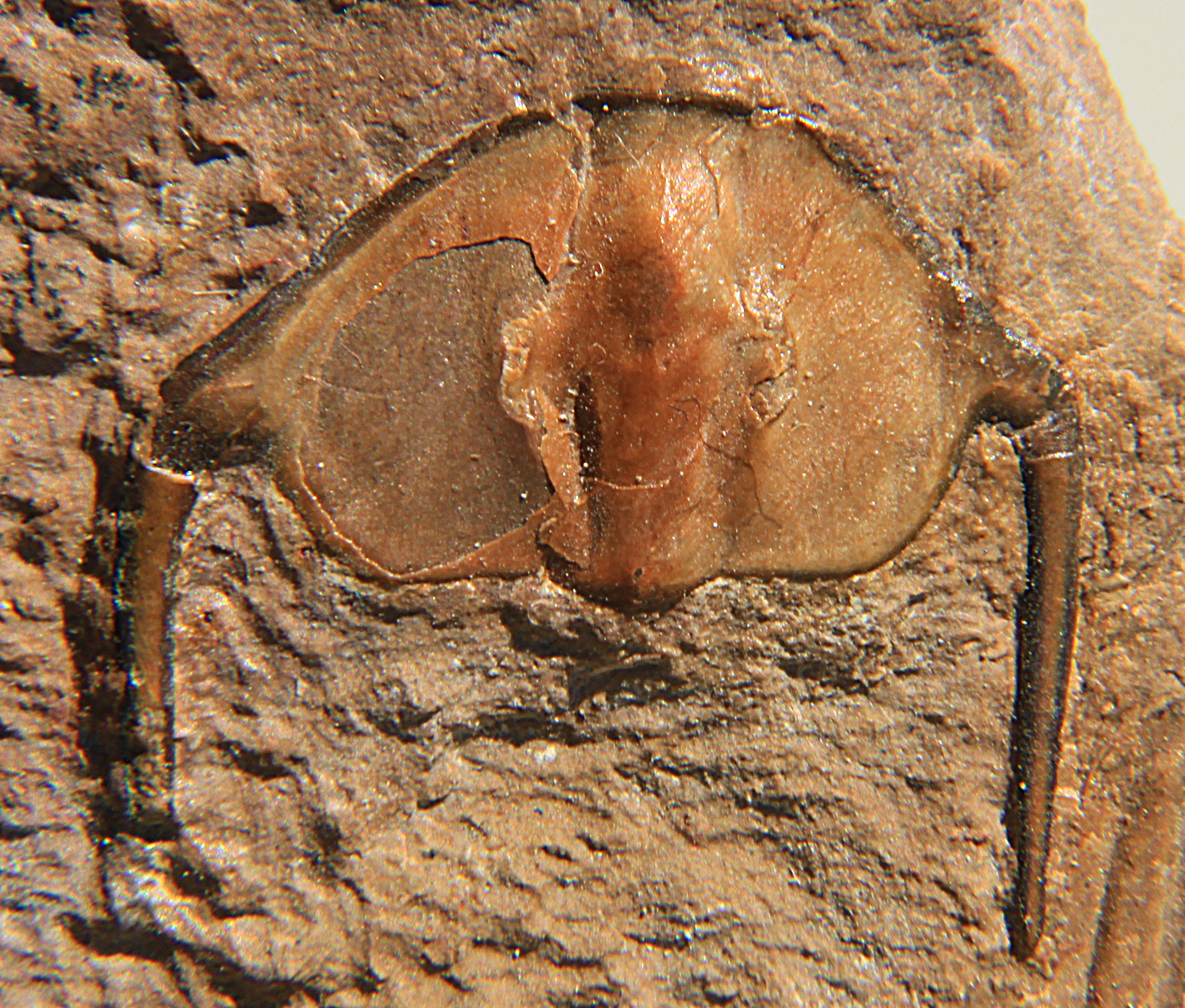
- Emigrantia sp., a cephalon

Scientific classification
- Kingdom: Animalia
- Phylum: Arthropoda
- Clade: †Artiopoda
- Class: †Trilobita
- Order: †Redlichiida
- Family: †Biceratopsidae
- Subfamily: †Biceratopsinae
- Genus: †Emigrantia nomen nudum

= Emigrantia =

Emigrantia Temporal range: Toyonian (Upper Olenellus-zone) 516–513 Ma

Emigrantia is an extinct genus of trilobites, fossil marine arthropods, of small to average size. It lived during the Toyonian stage (last phase of the Upper Olenellus-zone), in what is today the South-Western United States. Emigrantia can easily be distinguished from other trilobites by the sturdy but not inflated genal spines, that are attached at midlength of the cephalon, in combination with effaced features of the raised axial area of the head shield (or glabella).

== Etymology ==
The name of the genus is derived from Emigrant Pass, Nopah Range, California, near the collection site of many of the last of the Lower Cambrian Olenellina.

== Description ==
As with most early trilobites, Emigrantia has an almost flat exoskeleton, that is only thinly calcified. As part of the Olenellina suborder, Emigrantia lacks dorsal sutures. Like all other members of the Olenelloidea superfamily, the eye-ridges spring from the back of the frontal lobe (L4) of the central area of the cephalon, that is called glabella. The exoskeleton of Emigrantia is inverted egg-shaped in outline and up to 3 cm in length, disregarding the genal spines and the pleural spines of the 3rd thorax segment. The head shield (or cephalon) is approximately pentagonal, with the right and left frontal margin together forming a circle segment. It has a distinct cephalic border that is developed as a raised ridge. The genal spines are stout, up to 2 mm in diameter near the base and appear to be massive. They are attached about half length of the cephalon and bend quickly to proceed to their tip parallel to the midline. Intergenal angle strongly rounded, from perpendicular to the midline angling to 135°-150°. The glabella is of approximately constant width along its length, and the furrows are indistinct. The thorax has at least 12 segments, but probably a few more. The tips of the pleural lobes point backwards, but except for the third segment, these are not spiny. The 3rd segment is macropleural.

=== Differences with some other Biceratopsinae ===
Biceratops nevadensis and Peachella share extremely effaced cephalic features with Emigrantia. Biceratops however lacks genal spines. In Peachella the genal spines are short and bloated, in contrast with being longer than the cephalon and attached halfway down its side (or lateral margin). Eopeachella has short genal spines with only the basis inflated and less effaced cephalic features.

== Distribution ==
Emigrantia is known only from the Lower Cambrian of California (Carrara Formation, Thimble Limestone Member, Nopah Range, Inyo County).
