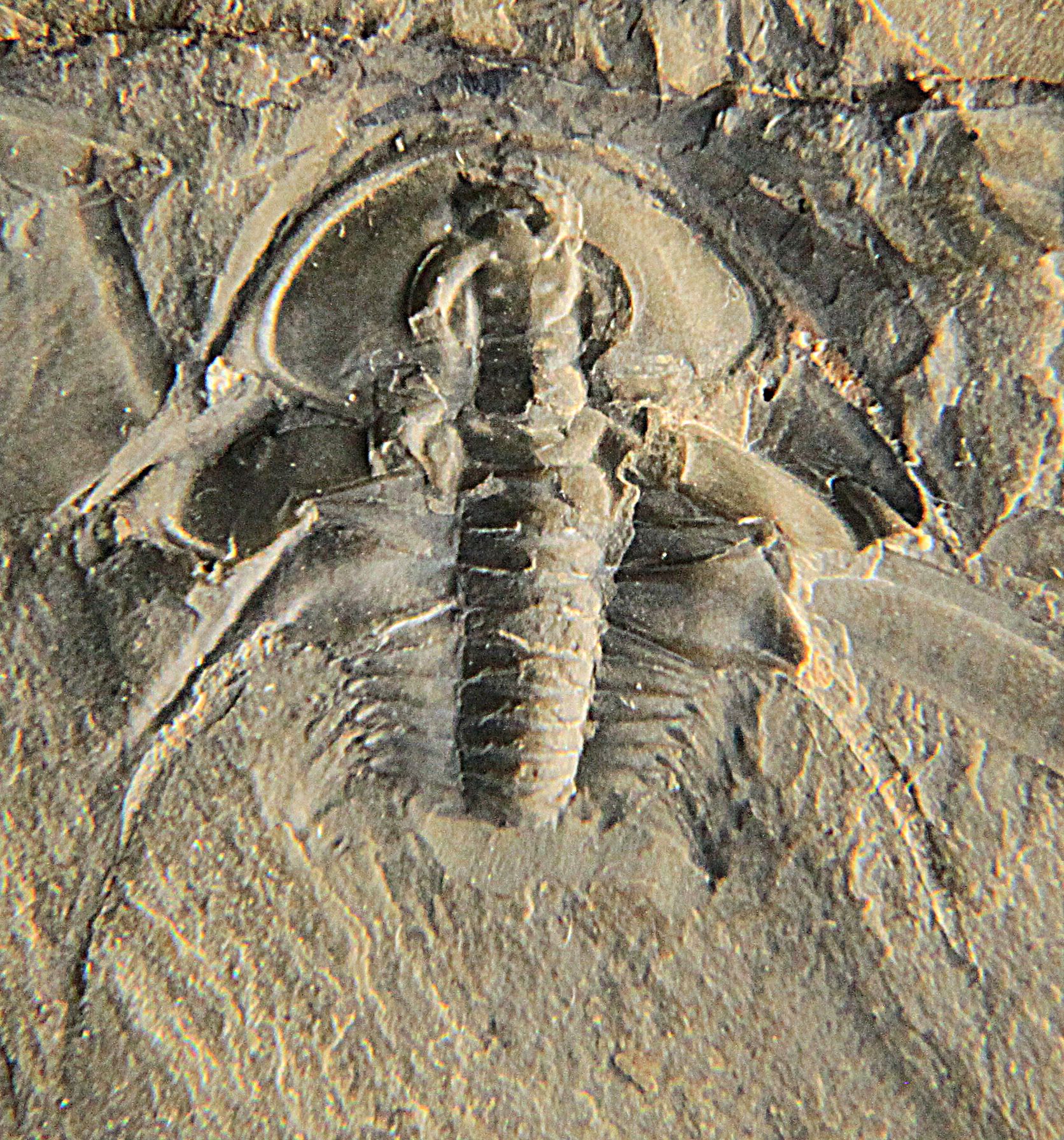
- Bristolia mohavensis, cephalon superimposed on a roled-up specimen with cephalon and thorax, pygidium hidden or absent

Scientific classification
- Kingdom: Animalia
- Phylum: Arthropoda
- Clade: †Artiopoda
- Class: †Trilobita
- Order: †Redlichiida
- Family: †Biceratopsidae
- Subfamily: †Bristoliinae
- Genus: †Bristolia; Harrington, 1956

Species
- B. bristolensis (Resser, 1928), (type), synonym Mesonacis bristolensis; B. anteros Palmer, 1979; B. brachyomma Palmer, 1979); B. fragilis Palmer, 1979; B. harringtoni Lieberman, 1999; B. insolens (Resser, 1928), synonyms Mesonacis insolens, Olenellus insolens; B. kurtzi Peel, 2011; B. mohavensis (Hazzard & Cirkmay, 1933), synonyms Paedeumias mohavensis, Olenellus mohavensis

= Bristolia =

Bristolia Temporal range: late Lower Cambrian (Lower Olenellus-zone) 522–516 Ma

Extinct genus of trilobites

Bristolia is an extinct genus of trilobite, fossil marine arthropods, with eight or more small to average size species. It is common in and limited to the Lower Cambrian (Upper Olenellus-zone) shelf deposits across the southwestern US, which constitutes part of the former paleocontinent of Laurentia.

== Taxonomy ==
Bristolia can be separated into two distinct groups: one consisting of B. insolens and B. anteros, the other comprising a gradual spectrum of morphologies including B. mohavensis, B. harringtoni, and B. bristolensis morphotypes. The second group reveals a dynamic morphological trend. From the oldest species B. mohavensis, the lineage undergoes gradational increase in intergenal angle and advancement of the genal spines, progressing through B. harringtoni, culminating in B. bristolensis. Younger specimens show a trend back to more acute intergenal angles and less advanced genal spines typical of B. fragilis. This development reflects an initial deepening of the water, followed by a reversal to increasingly shallower water. Bristolia insolens represents an extreme extrapolation of the earlier trend and is restricted to a narrow stratigraphic interval at maximal flooding.

=== Relations with other Olenellina ===
Bristolia is most related to Fremontella halli and slightly further removed from Lochmanolenellus mexicana. These three genera together comprise the subfamily Bristoliinae. The sister group Biceratopsinae can be distinguished by their strongly effaced cephalic features. Basic to both these subfamilies are the two species of the genus Laudonia. In Laudonia the anterior cephalic border is developed as a flattened ledge, not as an elevated ridge as in the Bristolinae. Also the furrow (S3) between the front lobe (L4) and the bordering side lobes (L3) is deepest at midline, while in the Bristolinae the depth is the same in the middle as to the sides. Fremontella, Lochmanolenellus and Laudonia have shorter genal spines (comparable to 4–5 thorax segments) than Bristolia (8 segments). Lochmanolenellus and Laudonia both have intergenal spines, while Bristolia and Fremontella lack intergenal spines in adults.

=== Species previously assigned to Bristolia ===
- Bristolia groenlandicus = Bolbolenellus groenlandicus
- Bristolia kentensis = Bolbolenellus groenlandicus

== Etymology ==
The genus Bristolia is derived from the species name of Mesonacis bristolensis, that was elevated to a separate genus. The names of the species have the following derivations.

- B. bristolensis refers to Bristol Dry Lake, in the neighbourhood of which this species has been found.
- B. harringtoni was named in honor of H.J. Harrington, who did important early research into Bristolia and erected this genus.
- B. kurtzi is named in honor of Vincent E. Kurtz, a paleontologist who investigated the fossils of Arctic Canada.
- B. mohavensis is called after the Mojave Desert within which it can be found.

== Description ==
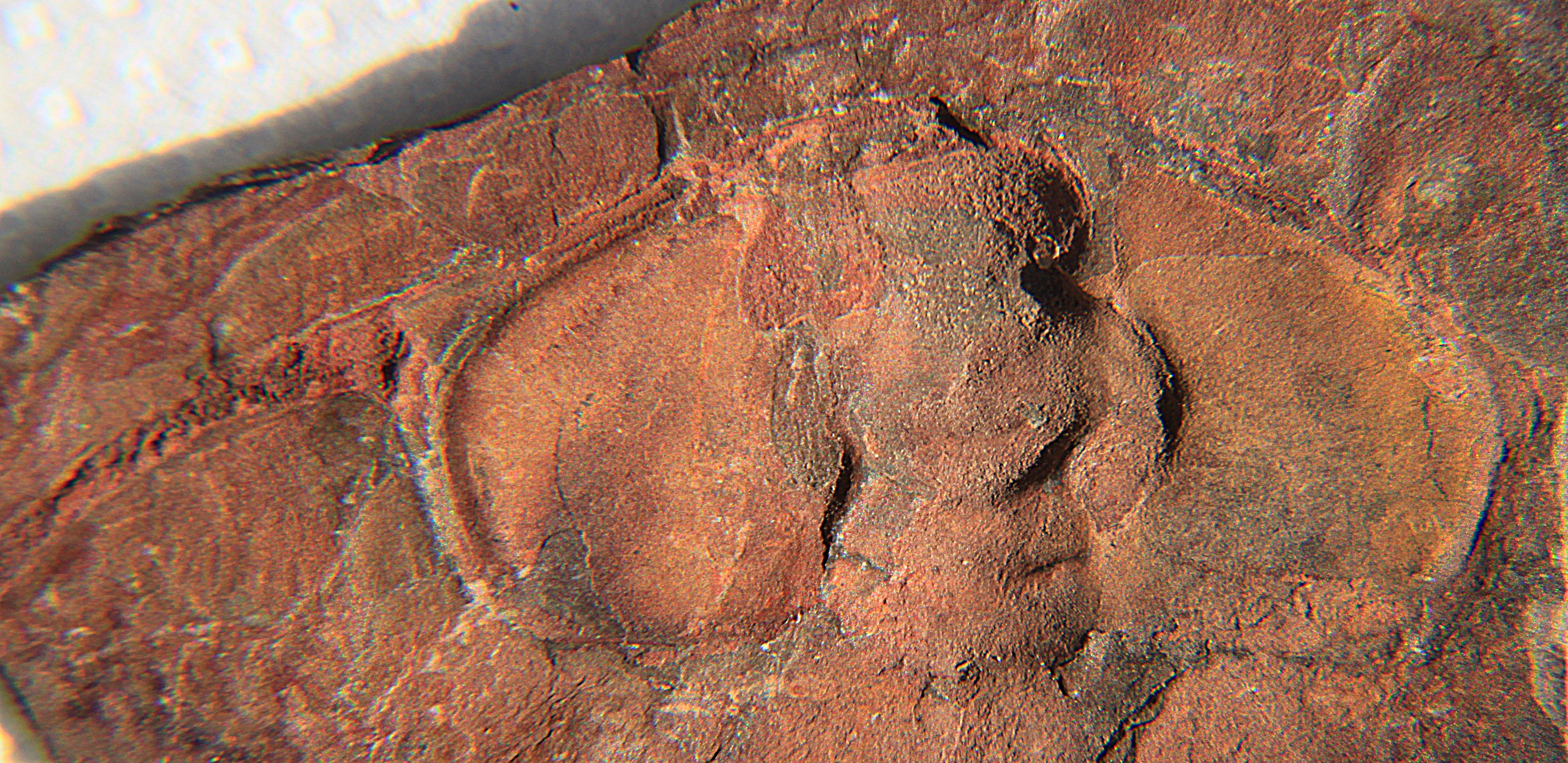
A negative imprint of the cephalon of Bristolia bristolensis

As with most early trilobites, Bristolia has an almost flat exoskeleton, that is only thinly calcified, and has crescent-shaped eye ridges. As part of the Olenellina suborder, Bristolia lacks dorsal sutures. Like all other members of the Olenelloidea superfamily, the eye-ridges spring from the back of the frontal lobe (L4) of the central area of the cephalon, that is called glabella. The headshield (or cephalon) of Bristolia carries conspicuous and curved spines (called genal spines) of approximately 8 thorax segments long (measured parallel to the midline). The genal spines are attached in front of the back of the headshield. The central raised portion that represents the axis in the cephalon (or glabella) touches the elevated ridge that borders the cephalon. The furrows that separate border, eye ridges, glabella and its lobes are distinct (unlike in the Biceratopsinae). The area outside of the axis (or pleural lobes) of the third segment of the thorax are greatly enlarged, and carrying large trailing spines. These extend further back than the rest of the body except for the axial spine that is carried by the most backward (15th) prothorax segment. The pleural lobes of the 1st, 2nd, 4th and 5th are consequently triangular in shape and edge forward and backward respectively, and do not carry spines. Prothorax segments further back carry slender spines that angle backwards. When the opistothorax is known it has at least 17 segments.

== Key to the species ==
1	Genal spines at their base directed outward and forward, before gradually bending more and more backwards. → 2
-	Genal spines at their base directed outward perpendicular to the midline or outward and backward, before gradually bending further backwards. → 3
2	Shape of the cephalon semi-circular, the genal spines attach approximately in front of the eyes. Eye ridges shaped like a pair of brackets, the tangent between the base and termination pointing backwards and slightly (10°) outwards. Small at adulthood (cephalon less than 1 cm measured along the midline). Lower half of the Bristolia insolens-zone. Picture. → Bristolia insolens
-	Shape of the cephalon rectangular, the genal spines attached at the frontal "corners". Eye ridges shaped like a pair of strongly curved hooks (with a broad base and a narrow termination), the tangent between the base and termination pointing backwards and significantly (40°) outwards. Upper half of the Bristolia insolens-zone to the lower half of the Peachella iddingsi-zone. Picture → Bristolia anteros
3	The angle the genal spine makes at its base compared to the midline is 50° or more. The border between the genal spine and the corner in the back edge of the cephalon (or intergenal angle) compared to the midline is 145° or more. → 4
-	The angle the genal spine makes at its base compared to the midline is 45° or less. The border between the genal spine and the corner in the back edge of the cephalon (or intergenal angle) compared to the midline is 135° or less. → 6
4	The angle the genal spine makes at its base compared to the midline is more than 65°. The border between the genal spine and the corner in the back edge of the cephalon (or intergenal angle) compared to the midline is 165° or more. → 5
-	The angle the genal spine makes at its base compared to the midline is between 50° and 60°. The border between the genal spine and the corner in the back edge of the cephalon (or intergenal angle) compared to the midline is between 145° and 160°. Middle part of the Bristolia mohavensis-zone. → Bristolia harringtoni
5	The frontal lobe of the glabella (L4) is close to the anterior border, but does not touch it. The glabella between the outer points of the furrow between the second and third pairs of side lobes (S2) is about three-fourths as wide as most backward lobe (L0). → Bristolia kurtzi
-	L4 touches the anterior border. S2 is about two-thirds as wide as most backward lobe (L0). Upper half of the Bristolia mohavensis-zone to the lower half of the Bristolia insolens-zone. Picture. → Bristolia bristolensis
6	The furrow between the second and third pairs of side lobes (S2) is convex (further back on the midline than to the sides of the glabella). Lower half of the Bristolia mohavensis-zone. Picture . → Bristolia mohavensis
-	The furrow between the second and third pairs of side lobes (S2) is transverse. Upper half of the Bristolia insolens-zone to the lower half of the Bolbolenellus euryparia-zone. Picture. → Bristolia fragilis

== Distribution ==
- B. bristolensis occurs in the Upper Olenellus-zone of California (Carrara Formation, Bristolia mohavensis and Bristolia insolens-subzones, of the Funeral Mountains, Resting Spring Range, Grapevine Mountains, White-Inyo Mountains near Death Valley, and the Latham shale of the Marble Mountains, 190 m west of the limestone quarry, 1/2 mi (0.8 km) east of Cadiz, in the Mojave Desert Portion of San Bernardino County).
- B. anteros is found in the Upper Olenellus-zone of Nevada (Bristolia insolens and Peachella iddingsi-subzones, at the Funeral Mountains, Last Chance Range, Grapevine Mountains, Desert Range and Nevada Test Site), and California (White-Inyo Mountains).
- B. brachyomma is present in the Upper Olenellus-zone of California (Bolbolenellus euryparia-subzone, Gold Ace Limestone Member, Carrara Formation, Emigrant Pass, 35°48′N 116°12′W).
- B. fragilis was collected in the Upper Olenellus-zone of Nevada (Bristolia insolens, Peachella iddingsi and Bolbolenellus euryparia-subzones, at the Funeral Mountains, and Grapevine Mountains), and California (White-Inyo Mountains).
- B. harringtoni is present in the Upper Olenellus-zone of California (midsection of the Bristolia insolens-subzone of the Latham Shale at the southern end of the Marble Mountains, 190 m west of the limestone quarry, 1/2 mi (0.8 km) east of Cadiz, in the Mojave Desert Portion of San Bernardino County), and of the Carrara Formation at Salt Spring Hills, Grapevine Mountains), and the White-Inyo Mountains).
- B. insolens occurs in the Upper Olenellus-zone of California (Latham shale of the Marble Mountains, 190 m west of the limestone quarry, 1/2 mi (0.8 km) east of Cadiz, in the Mojave Desert Portion of San Bernardino County, Bristolia insolens-subzone).
- Bristolia kurtzi is found in the late Lower Cambrian of Canada (Rabbit Point Formation, Devon Island).
- B. mohavensis is found in the Upper Olenellus-zone of California (Latham Shale at the southern end of the Marble Mountains, 190 m west of the limestone quarry, 1/2 mi (0.8 km) east of Cadiz, in the Mojave Desert Portion of San Bernardino County).

== Habitat ==
Bristolia was probably marine bottom dweller, like all Olenellina.
