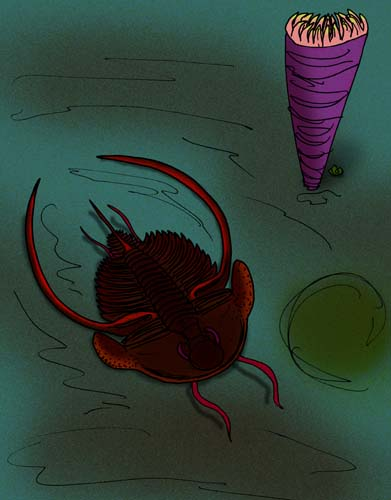
- P. iddingsi reconstruction

Scientific classification
- Kingdom: Animalia
- Phylum: Arthropoda
- Clade: †Artiopoda
- Class: †Trilobita
- Order: †Redlichiida
- Family: †Biceratopsidae
- Subfamily: †Biceratopsinae
- Genus: †Peachella; Walcott, 1910

Type species
- Olenellus iddingsi Walcott, 1884

Species
- P. iddingsi (Walcott, 1884) (Type); P. brevispina Palmer, 1979

= Peachella =

Peachella Temporal range: Toyonian (Upper Olenellus-zone)

Extinct genus of trilobites

Peachella is an extinct genus of trilobites, fossil marine arthropods, with species of average size (about 3.5 centimetres or 1.4 inches long). It lived during the Toyonian stage (Upper Olenellus-zone), 516 to 513 million years ago, in what is today the southwestern United States. It can easily be distinguished from other trilobites by its club-like genal spines.

== Etymology ==
Peachella is named in honor of Benjamin Neeve Peach, a British geologist. The species epithet brevispina is derived from Latin and means 'short spine'. P. iddingsi was named in honor of Joseph P. Iddings, an accomplished American geologist.

== Origin ==
The earliest occurrence of the ancestral Eopeachella angustispina predates both Peachella species, its latest occurrence overlaps with P. iddingsi, which, in turn overlaps with P. brevispina. E. angustispina has thick, tapered, blunt, genal spines and shallow but clear glabellar furrows. This species therefore bridges the morphological gap between the derived Peachella species and earlier olenelloid relatives that possess ‘normal’ genal spines.

== Description ==
As with most early trilobites, Peachella has an almost flat exoskeleton, that is only thinly calcified. It also shares crescent-shaped eye ridges, but these rise above the exoskeleton. As part of the suborder Olenellina, Peachella lacks dorsal sutures. Like all other members of the superfamily Olenelloidea, the eye-ridges spring from the back of the frontal lobe (L4) of the central area of the cephalon, that is called glabella. Peachella is an average sized biceratopsid trilobite, that exhibits the strongly effaced cephalic features that are typical for a clade within the subfamily Biceratopsinae. It has the enormous sickle-shaped pleural spines on the 3rd thoracal segment with the rest of the family Biceratopsidae (except for Bolbolenellus). Peachella is unique in having short, wide, strongly inflated genal spines, with broadly rounded tips. The cephalon is semi-circular in outline with short, strongly inflated rounded spines. The central area of the cephalon (or glabella) is elongated, reaching the anterior border, but its features are strongly effaced, almost showing no furrows. The frontal 14 or 15 segments (or prothorax) can readily be distinguished from the terminal 9 to 11 (forming the opisthothorax). The last segment of the prothorax may carry a large spine. The tips of the pleura are rounded, which is unlike the usual pointed terminations in other Olenellina. The tailshield (or pygidium) is very small and subquadrate in shape.

=== Differences with some other Biceratopsinae ===
Biceratops nevadensis and Emigrantia share extremely effaced cephalic features with Peachella. Biceratops however lacks genal spines. In Emigrantia the genal spines are longer than the cephalon and attach halfway down its side (or lateral margin), instead of being short and bloated. Eopeachella has genal spines which are inflated only the basis, and the cephalic features are only moderately effaced.

== Distribution ==
Specimens of Peachella brevispina have been collected from the middle Peachella iddingsi-zone of the Dublin Hills, Eagle Mountain, and Nopah Range, all in Inyo County 35°48′N 116°12′W, California. Further specimens were found in the Chief Range and Highland Range, in Lincoln County, Nevada.

Peachella iddingsi, occurs in the lower half of the Peachella iddingsi-zone of the Marble Mountains and Providence Mountains (San Bernardino County), Grapevine Mountains, Funeral Mountain, Emigrants Pass in the Nopah Range, Eagle Mountain, Resting Springs Range and Last Chance Range (all Inyo County), in California. P. iddlingsi also comes from Groom Range, Delamar Mountains, and Chief Range (all Lincoln County), the Desert Range and the Spring Mountains (Clark County), Toiyable Range (Lander County), and Prospect Peak (Eureka County), Nevada.

== Habitat ==
Peachella species were probably marine bottom dwellers, like all Olenellina.

== Ecology ==
P. brevispina occurs together with Bristolia fragilis, Olenellus nevadensis and P. iddingsi. P. iddingsi occurs together with Bristolia fragilis, Bristolia aff. fragilis A, Paranephrolenellus besti, Mesonacis fremonti, Olenellus nevadensis, Olenellus aff. terminatus, and the tops of the ranges of Eopeachella angustispina and Bristolia anteros. The range of P. iddingsi coincides with the bottom of the range of P. brevispina, and may even fully enclose it.

== Key to the Species ==
1	Genal spines strongly inflated, blunt and club-like. Posterior margin of the cephalon straight or gradually arching forwards or backwards.→ 2
-	Genal spines moderately inflated at base, pointed. Outer 1/3 of the posterior margin of the cephalon angling forward. → Eopeachella angustispina Webster, 2009
2	Basis of the inflated genal spines opposite the frontal half of the eyes. Macropleural spines of the 3rd thorax segment relatively long (at least 3/4× body length) and slender (width at midlength of the prothorax up to 1/3 of the axis), emerging from the thorax at approximately 45° or more perpendicular to the axis. → Peachella iddingsi (Walcott, 1884)
-	Basis of the inflated genal spines opposite the posterior half of the eyes. Macropleural spines of the 3rd thorax segment relatively short (at most 2/3× body length) and robust (width at midlength of the prothorax more than 1/2 of the axis), emerging from the thorax at approximately 35° or less perpendicular to the axis. → Peachella brevispina Palmer, 1979
