= Paranephrolenellus =

Paranephrolenellus Temporal range: Toyonian (Upper Olenellus-zone) 516–513 Ma

Scientific classification
- Kingdom: Animalia
- Phylum: Arthropoda
- Clade: †Artiopoda
- Class: †Trilobita
- Order: †Redlichiida
- Family: †Biceratopsidae
- Subfamily: †Biceratopsinae
- Genus: †Paranephrolenellus; Webster, 2007

Species
- P. besti Webster, 2007 (Type); P. cowiei Peel, 2011; P. inflatus Webster, 2007; P. klondikensis Webster, 2007

Genus of trilobites

Paranephrolenellus is an extinct genus of trilobite, fossil marine arthropods. Currently four species are attributed to it. Paranephrolenellus lived at the end of the Lower Cambrian.

== Etymology ==
Paranephrolenellus is named for the close similarity of this genus to Nephrolenellus. The names of the species are derived as follows.

- P. besti is named in honor of R.V. Best, for his work on the olenelloids of the Laurentian Cordillera.
- P. inflatus refers to the inflation of the lateral cephalic border and base of the genal spines.
- P. klondikensis is named for Klondike Gap, Chief Range, where the species was first discovered.
