= Eopeachella =

Eopeachella Temporal range: Toyonian (Upper Olenellus-zone) 516–513 Ma

Scientific classification
- Kingdom: Animalia
- Phylum: Arthropoda
- Clade: †Artiopoda
- Class: †Trilobita
- Order: †Redlichiida
- Family: †Biceratopsidae
- Subfamily: †Biceratopsinae
- Genus: †Eopeachella; Webster, 2009

Type species
- Eopeachella angustispina Webster, 2009

Eopeachella is an extinct genus of trilobites, fossil marine arthropods, with species of probably small size (largest headshield (or cephalon) 1.1 centimetres or 0.43 inches long), entire, articulate specimens have not yet been found. It lived during the Toyonian stage (Upper Olenellus-zone), in what is today the South-Western United States. Eopeachella angustispina is the only known species in this genus (i.e. the genus is monotypic).

== Etymology ==
Eopeachella is named for its early occurrence compared to and presumed closeness to Peachella. The species epithet angustispina refers to the slender genal spines compared to those in the species of Peachella.

== Description ==
Only the cephalon of Eopeachella is known. It is a small sized biceratopsid trilobite, that exhibits the effaced cephalic features that are typical for that family. Eopeachella has short, stout genal spines, which are somewhat inflated at base and terminate in pointed tips and inflated lateral cephalic borders.
The cephalon is semi-circular in outline with short, strongly inflated rounded spines. The central area of the cephalon (or glabella) is elongated, reaching the anterior border, and hourglass shaped. Its features are effaced, showing only shallow furrows.

=== Differences with some other Biceratopsinae ===
Some other Biceratopsinae share some of the most eye catching features of Eopeachella. These differ however in the following characteristics. Biceratops nevadensis, Emigrantia and Peachella all have more extremely effaced cephalic features. Biceratops lacks genal spines. In Emigrantia the genal spines are longer than the cephalon and attach halfway down its side (or lateral margin). Peachella has club-like genal spines. The genal spine bases and lateral cephalic border are also inflated in Paranephrolenellus inflatus, but this species differs from Eopeachella in having clearly visible glabellar furrows, and strongly divergent ocular lobes.

=== Relations with other biceratopsids ===
Eopeachella first occurs in the fossil record before both Peachella species, although it overlaps with P. iddingsi. The thick, tapered, genal spines and shallow but clear glabellar furrows of E. angustispina are intermediate between the Peachella species that have club-like strongly inflated genal spines and more radically effaced cephalic features and ancestral olenelloidea.

== Distribution ==
Specimens of Eopeachella angustispina have been collected from the Delamar Mountains in Lincoln County, Nevada.

== Habitat ==
E. angustispina was probably a marine bottom dweller, like all Olenellina.

== Ecology ==
E. angustispina occurs together with Olenellus nevadensis, Peachella iddingsi and Bristolia sp..
