= Fremontella =

Fremontella Temporal range: Toyonian (Upper Olenellus-zone)

Scientific classification
- Kingdom: Animalia
- Phylum: Arthropoda
- Clade: †Artiopoda
- Class: †Trilobita
- Order: †Redlichiida
- Family: †Biceratopsidae
- Subfamily: †Bristoliinae
- Genus: †Fremontella; Harrington, 1956
- Species: †F. halli

Binomial name
- †Fremontella halli (Walcott, 1910)

Synonyms
- Wanneria halli; Olenellus halli; Olenellus alabamensis

Fremontella is an extinct genus from a well-known class of fossil marine arthropods, the trilobites. It lived during the part of the Toyonian stage. This faunal stage was part of the Cambrian Period. Fremontella shares with the other genera of the Bristoliinae subfamily, Lochmanolenellus and Bristolia conspicuous and long curved spines (called genal spines) on the headshield (or cephalon). These reach back equal to 4–5 thorax segments (measured parallel to the midline). The furrows that separate border, eye ridges, glabella and its lobes are distinct (unlike in the Biceratopsinae). The area outside of the axis (or pleural lobes) of the third segment of the thorax is enlarged, and carries large trailing spine on each side.

== Distribution ==
Fremontella halli has been collected in the Upper Olenellus-zone of Alabama, USA (Rome Formation, North-East of Helena).
