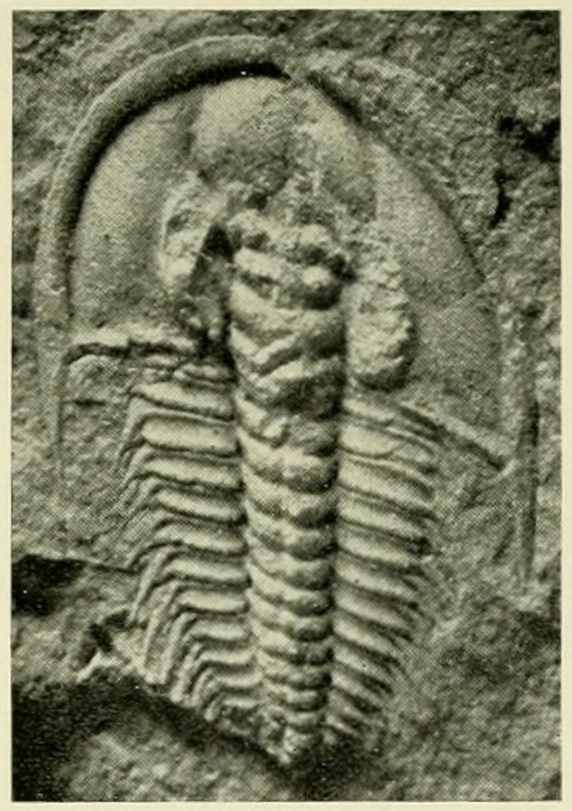
- Mummaspis macer, (Type specimen), Fruitville, Lancaster County, Pennsylvania. U.S. National Museum, Catalogue No. 60092

Scientific classification
- Kingdom: Animalia
- Phylum: Arthropoda
- Class: Trilobita
- Order: Redlichiida
- Suborder: Olenellina
- Superfamily: Olenelloidea
- Family: Laudoniidae
- Genus: Mummaspis Fritz, 1992

Species
- M. occidens (Walcott, 1913), (type), synonyms Wanneria occidens, Esmeraldina occidens; M. truncatooculatus (Fritz, 1992), synonym Olenellus truncatooculatus; M. oblisooculatus Fritz, 1992; M. muralensis (Fritz, 1992), synonym Olenellus muralensis; M. macer (Walcott, 1913), synonyms Holmia macer, Esmeraldina macer, Wanneria macer

= Mummaspis =

Mummaspis Temporal range: late Lower Cambrian (Lower Olenellus-zone) 524–518.5 Ma

Mummaspis is an extinct genus from a well-known class of fossil marine arthropods, the trilobites, with five known species. It lived during the early part of the Botomian stage, which lasted from approximately 524 to 518.5 million years ago. This faunal stage was part of the Cambrian Period.

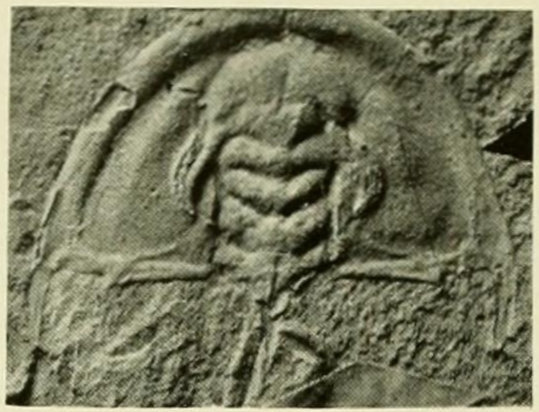
Headshield of Mummaspis occidens, type specimen. U.S. National Museum, Catalogue No. 60080

== Taxonomy ==
Mummaspis is the genus closest to the common ancestor of Laudonia, the Biceratopsinae and the Bristoliinae. Including the species of Fritzolenellus, this clade is the sister group of Wanneria walcottana and the Holmiidae.

== Distribution ==
- M. occidens was collected in the Lower Cambrian (lower Olenellus-zone) of Alberta, Canada (Mural Formation, in the talus slope immediately west of Mumm Peak, and from the middle Mural Formation, 125 m above the base of that formation, just north of the Mount Robson Provincial Park boundary).
- M. truncatooculatus occurs in the Lower Cambrian (lower Olenellus-zone) of Alberta, Canada (Mural Formation, in the talus slope immediately west of Mumm Peak, and from the middle Mural Formation, 125 m above the base of that formation, just north of the Mount Robson Provincial Park boundary).
- M. oblisooculatus is found in the Lower Cambrian (Lower Olenellus-zone) of Alberta, Canada (Mural Formation, in the talus slope immediately west of Mumm Peak, and from the middle Mural Formation, 125 m above the base of that formation, just north of the Mount Robson Provincial Park boundary).
- M. muralensis is present in the Lower Cambrian (Lower Olenellus-zone) of Alberta, Canada (Mural Formation, in the talus slope immediately west of Mumm Peak, and from the middle Mural Formation, 125 m above the base of that formation, just north of the Mount Robson Provincial Park boundary).
- M. macer was extracted from the Lower Cambrian of Pennsylvania (middle Upper Olenellus-zone) (Kinzers Formation, 2 miles North of York, from Fruitville, 3 miles North of Lancaster, and ½ mile South of East-Petersburg.
