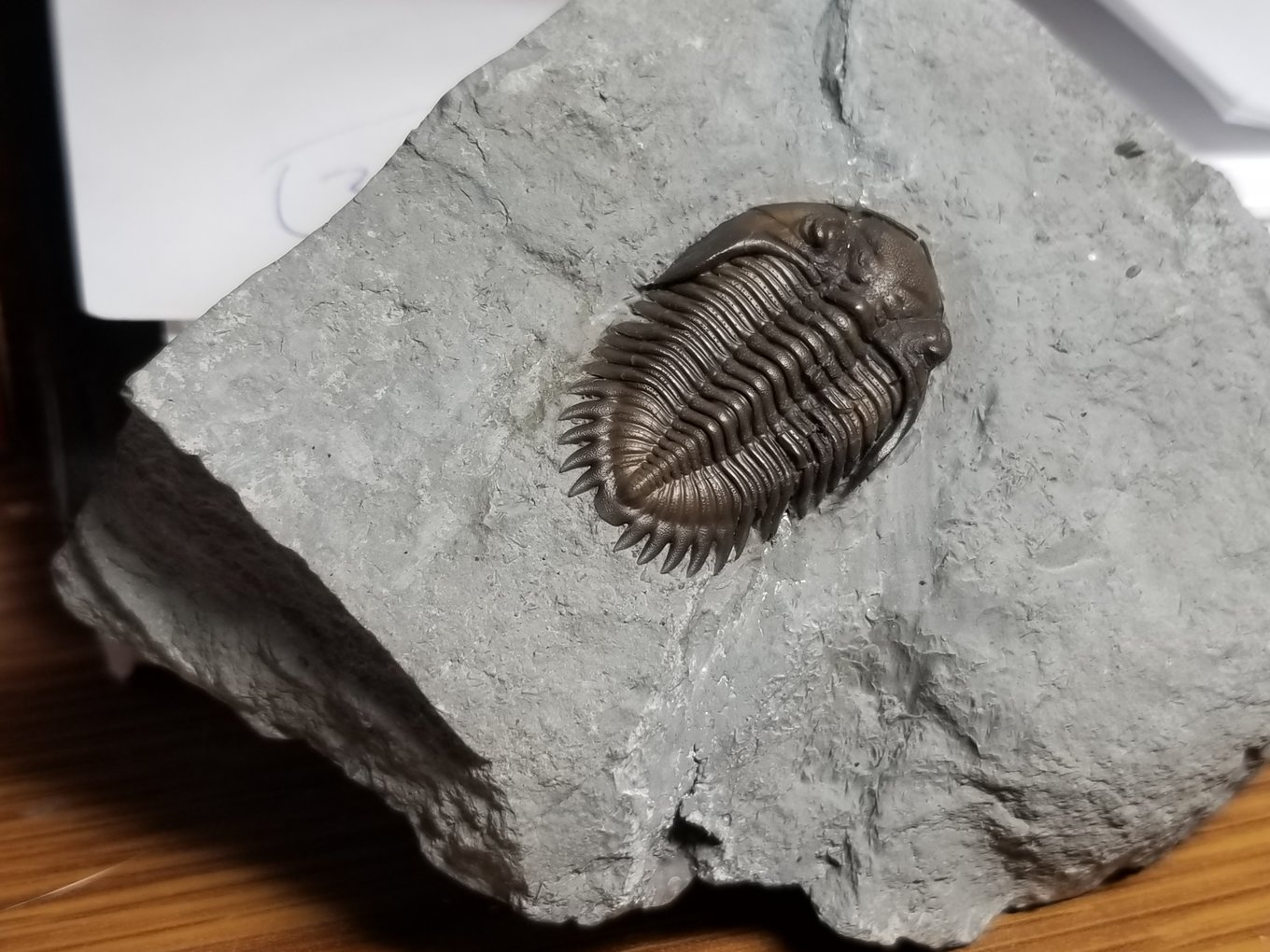
- G. widderensis Widder Shale, Arkona, Ontario CA

Scientific classification
- Domain: Eukaryota
- Kingdom: Animalia
- Phylum: Arthropoda
- Class: †Trilobita
- Order: †Phacopida
- Family: †Acastidae
- Genus: †Greenops; Delo, 1935

Species
- G. boothi (Green, 1837) (type) = Cryphaeus boothi; G. barberi Lieberman & Kloc, 1997; G. chilmanae Strumm, 1965; G. grabaui Lieberman & Kloc, 1997; G. widderensis Lieberman & Kloc, 1997

Synonyms
- Cryphaeus Green, 1837 non Cryphaeus Klug, 1833, a Tenebrionid beetle

= Greenops =

Greenops Temporal range: Eifelian-Frasnian ~398–375 Ma

Extinct genus of trilobite

Greenops is a mid-sized Devonian trilobite of the order Phacopida, subfamily Asteropyginae. They are mainly reported from the mid-Devonian Hamilton Group of upstate New York and southwestern Ontario. A similar-looking trilobite from Morocco is often mis-labelled Greenops. Greenops had schizocroidal eyes (resembling compound eyes in insects), large genal spines and short, sharp spines at the tip of each segment of the pygidium ("tail"). Greenops lived in warm, fairly deep water. In the Hamilton Group of New York, they are found with Eldredgeops, Dipleura and Bellacartwrightia, a trilobite that resembles Greenops but has much larger pygidial spines. In Ontario, they are found in the Widder Formation, which outcrops at Arkona, where they are, by far, the dominant trilobite.

Greenops' average size is about 25 to 40 millimetres (1 to 1 1/2 inches). They were fairly common trilobites, and are easily identified. While it is rare to find a complete disarticulated body, segments and tails are fairly common. They are fairly common finds in Late Devonian limestones, especially storm deposits. They are identified by their tails, which sport several spines. They were medium to small sized trilobites, which were most likely preyed upon by ammonoids, straight cephalopods, sharks, and small placoderms, hence the defensive spines. All of these animals have been found in close association with this trilobite. Greenops can also be found in deep marine deposits, but there it is fairly rare. Greenops was a small, yet charmingly beautiful trilobite, like its close companion Eldredgeops.

== Taxonomy ==
=== Species previously assigned to Greenops ===
Some species originally described under this genus have since been reassigned to other genera.

- G. alpensis = Kayserops alpensis
- G. arkonensis = Stummiana arkonensis
- G. chaconae = Breizhops chaconae
- G. haasi = Deloops haasi
- G. osismorum = Stummiana osismorum
- G. pleione = Bellacartwrightia pleione
- G. stellifer = Neometacantus stellifer
- G. struvei = Modellops struvei
- G. transversensis = Kayserops transversensis

== Distribution ==
Fossils of Greenops have been found in France, the Floresta Formation of the Altiplano Cundiboyacense, Colombia, Libya, Spain, United States (Illinois, Indiana, Iowa, New York, Pennsylvania), Canada (Arkona, Ontario) and the Caño del Oeste Formation of Venezuela.
