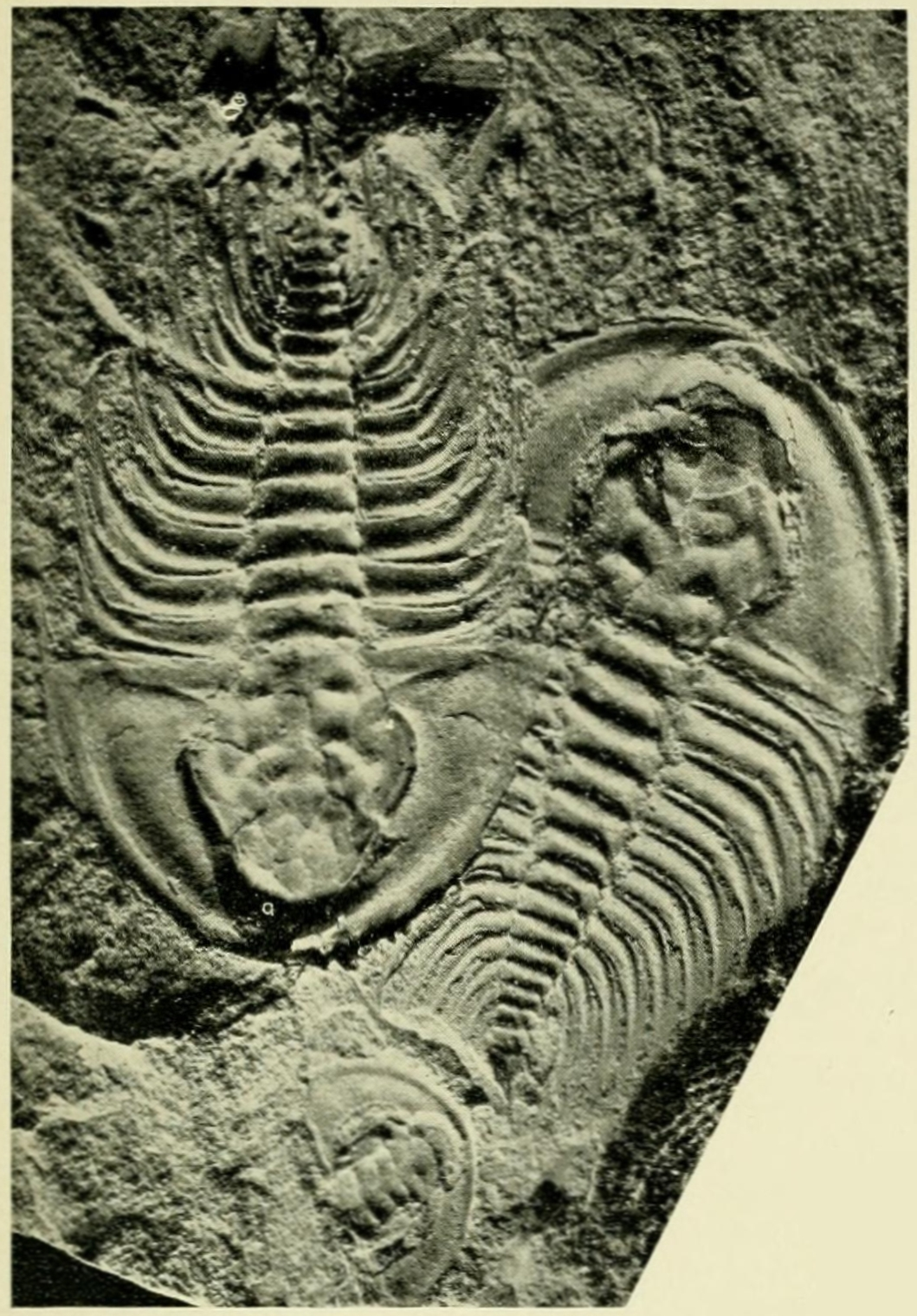
- Fritzolenellus truemani, North-East base of Mumm Peak above Mural Glacier, Alberta, Canada

Scientific classification
- Kingdom: Animalia
- Phylum: Arthropoda
- Class: Trilobita
- Order: Redlichiida
- Suborder: Olenellina
- Superfamily: Olenelloidea
- Family: Laudoniidae
- Genus: Fritzolenellus Lieberman, 1998

Species
- F. truemani (Walcott, 1913), (type), synonym Olenellus truemani; F. lapworthi (Peach & Horne, 1892), synonym Olenellus lapworthi; F. reticulatus (Peach, 1894), synonym Olenellus reticulatus

= Fritzolenellus =

Fritzolenellus Temporal range: late Lower Cambrian (Lower Olenellus-zone) 524–518.5 Ma

Fritzolenellus is an extinct genus from a well-known class of fossil marine arthropods, the trilobites, with three known species. It lived during the early part of the Botomian stage, which lasted from approximately 524 to 518.5 million years ago. This faunal stage was part of the Cambrian Period. Fritzolenellus occurred in parts of the paleocontinent Laurentia in what are now Northwestern Canada, Northwestern Scotland, and North-Greenland.

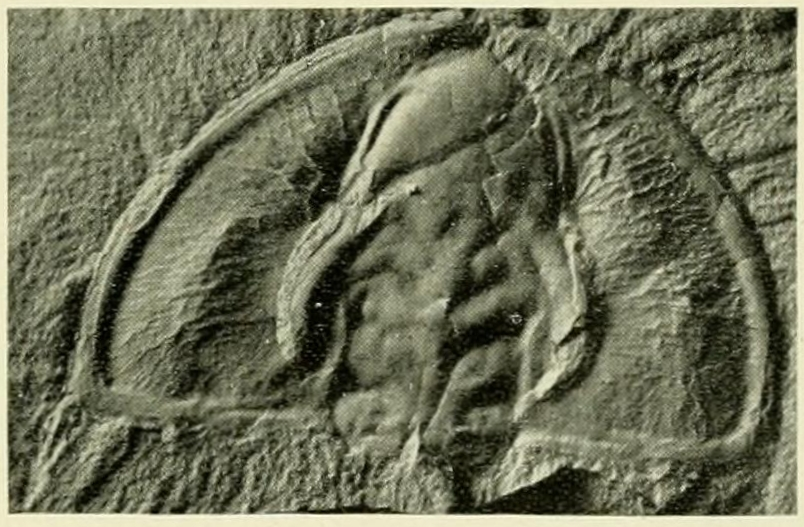
Headshield of Fritzolenellus truemani. Cephalon with outer test of cheeks exfoliated so as to show casts of radial canals. U.S. National Museum, Catalogue No. 60087

== Taxonomy ==
Fritzolenellus is the genus closest to the common ancestor of Mummaspis, Laudonia, the Biceratopsinae and the Bristoliinae. This clade is the sister group Wanneria walcottana and of the Holmiidae.

== Etymology ==
The generic name is a combination of the genus Olenellus, to which these species were originally assigned, and a reference to William Henry Fritz (1928-2009), a paleontologist who worked on olenelloid trilobites. The species names have the following derivation.

- lapworthi is named in honor of Charles Lapworth, an English geologist who pioneered faunal analysis using index fossils and who defined the Ordovician.
- reticulatus (Latin) refers to the coarsely netted exoskeleton.

== Distribution ==
- F. truemani was collected in the Lower Cambrian (lower Olenellus-zone) of Alberta, Canada (Mural Formation, in the talus slope immediately west of Mumm Peak, from the middle Mural Formation, 125 m above the base of that formation, just north of the Mount Robson Provincial Park boundary). It is also known from North-Greenland (Henson Gletscher Formation).
- F. lapworthi occurs in the Lower Cambrian (lower Olenellus-zone) of Scotland (Allt nan Righrion, Meall a ‘Ghiubhais, Loch Awe), and from the middle Dryeran of Northeastern Greenland (Upper Bastion Formation at Albert Heim Bjerge).
- F. reticulatus is found in the Lower Cambrian (Lower Olenellus-zone) of Scotland (Meall a ‘Ghiubhais, Allt nan Righrion, Loch Awe).

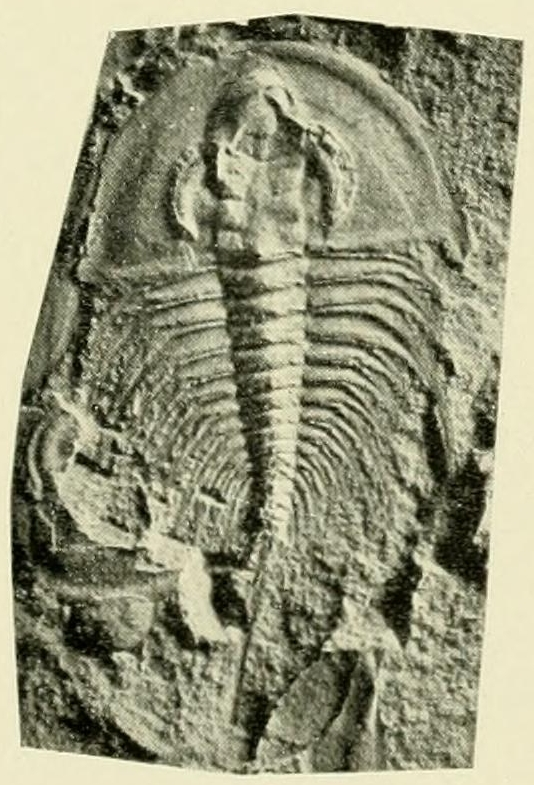
Fritzolenellus truemani. A small, almost entire dorsal shield. U.S. National Museum, Catalogue No. 60089.
