= Lochmanolenellus =

Lochmanolenellus Temporal range: late Lower Cambrian (Lower Olenellus-zone) 522–516 Ma

Scientific classification
- Kingdom: Animalia
- Phylum: Arthropoda
- Clade: †Artiopoda
- Class: †Trilobita
- Order: †Redlichiida
- Family: †Biceratopsidae
- Subfamily: †Bristoliinae
- Genus: †Lochmanolenellus; Lieberman, 1998
- Species: †L. mexicana

Binomial name
- †Lochmanolenellus mexicana (Lochman, 1952)

Synonyms
- Wanneria mexicana prima; Laudonia mexicana

Genus of trilobites

Lochmanolenellus is an extinct genus of redlichiid trilobites in the family Biceratopsidae, with one species, L. mexicana. It lived during the Botomian stage (Olenellus-zone), 522–513 million years ago, in the South-West of the former continent of Laurentia, in what are today Mexico, and the South-Western United States.

== Etymology ==
Lochmanolenellus is named in honor of C. Lochman, who initially described the fossils that are assigned to this genus, and for its likeness to Olenellus a distantly related genus. The species epithet mexicana refers to Mexico, where the first specimen was found.

== Taxonomy ==
Lochmanolenellus mexicana was first described as Wanneria mexicana prima. There are however so many differences, that it is highly unlikely L. mexicana is more than distantly related. Later scholars assigned the species to Laudonia. Although Laudonia is much more related than Wanneria, L. mexicana must be considered an early representative of the Biceratopsid subfamily Bristoliinae, that additionally includes the genera Bristolia and Fremontella.

== Description ==
The headshield (or cephalon) is not semi-circular but near pentangular, about 1¼ times wider than long. The front has a blunt angle at midline. The most frontal spines (or genal spines) are prominent, pointing backwards and outwards at about 65° compared to the midline. The genal angle (between the back of the spine and the cephalic border to the rear of the spine) is opposite the furrow between L2 and L3 – the scientific convention is to count glabellar lobes back to front, giving them the following names: occipital ring or lobe (OR, OL or L0), 1st lobe (L1), 2nd lobe (L2), 3rd lobe (L3), and anterior lobe (AL or L4). The base of the genal spine is equally far from the midline as the base of the intergenal angle. The most backwards spines (or intergenal spines) are prominent too, pointing backwards and outwards at about 45° compared to the midline. The intergenal angle is opposite the middle of the occipital ring (L0). The rounded ridge that borders the cephalon (or cephalic border) and the frontal lobe (L4) of the raised central part of the cephalon (or glabella) touch. L4 bulges out the plain where cephalon rests. L4 is wider than the rearmost ring of the glabella (L0); L4 has the same length of L0 and L1 together. The eye-lobe (or ocular lobe) is stocky, reaching no further back than the furrow between L2 and L3. The medial part of posterior border flexing gently backwards.

== Distribution ==
Lochmanolenellus mexicana occurs in the Lower Cambrian, (lower Olenellus-zone, Botomian) (Puerto Blanco Formation, west side of Proveedora Hills, 7 miles west of Caborca, Sonora, Mexico). It has also been collected in the Lower Cambrian, lower Olenellus-zone (upper part of the Poleta Formation, White–Inyo Mountains, Death Valley).

== Habitat ==
Lochmanolenellus was probably marine bottom dweller, like all Olenellina.
