= Alycia Stigall =

American palaeontologist

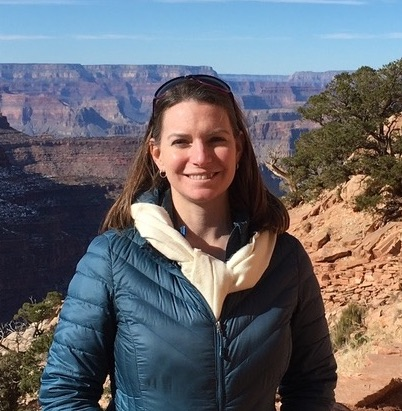
- Stigall in 2019
- Born: Colerain Township, Hamilton County, Ohio, US
- Spouse: Daniel Hembree (m. 2006)

Academic background
- Education: B.S., Biology and Geological Sciences, 1999, Ohio State University; M.S., 2001, PhD, 2004, University of Kansas

Alycia L. Stigall is an American palaeontologist. As a professor at Ohio University, she was the first to analyze the biogeographic ranges of Paleozoic fossils using Geographic information systems.

== Early life and education ==
Stigall was born and raised in Colerain Township, Hamilton County, Ohio to parents Jackie and Joe Stigall. Growing up, she spent time collecting brachiopods and bryozoans from a nearby creek and went camping in various National Parks across the country. Stigall attended Colerain High School where she was a National Merit Finalist and member of the National Honor Society, Marching Band, Collage, Show Choir, and German Club. Prior to graduating, she earned a full academic scholarship to Ohio State University.

Upon earning a Bachelor of Science degree from Ohio State University in 1995, she was named the top science graduate in the country and received the only Grinnell Fellowship at the University of Kansas. Similarly, she also earned a science foundation grant for $15,000 per year for the next four years for graduate-level studies.

== Career ==
Upon receiving her PhD, Stigall joined the faculty at Ohio University as an assistant professor of geological sciences. In this role, she published a study suggesting that the planet's current ecosystem, which is struggling with biodiversity loss, could lead to a similar collapse of Earth's marine as happened 378 to 375 million years ago. This led her to become the first to analyze the biogeographic ranges of Paleozoic fossils using Geographic information systems. She also published an article in Palaeontology arguing for a broader evolutionary theory that accounts for large-scale environmental changes such as plate tectonics, sea level changes and climate change over periods measured by tens of thousands of years.

Stigall was inspired by the book, A Golden Guide to Fossils, which she read in her youth, to develop an updated, comprehensive online database titled the Digital Atlas of Ordovician Life. She also co-developed an online free app called "Digital Atlas of Ancient Life" which aimed to be a tool for "exploring and identifying marine fossils from three different regions and time periods." In 2016, Stigall was the recipient of the Charles Schuchert Award from the Paleontological Society given in recognition of a paleontologist under the age of 40. She was recognized for her "contributions to the understanding of the impact of species invasion on species and ecosystems within shallow marine communities during the Ordovician Period and the Late Devonian Mass Extinction." She was also acknowledged by the Association for Women Geoscientists with their Professional Excellence Award in the academia and research category.

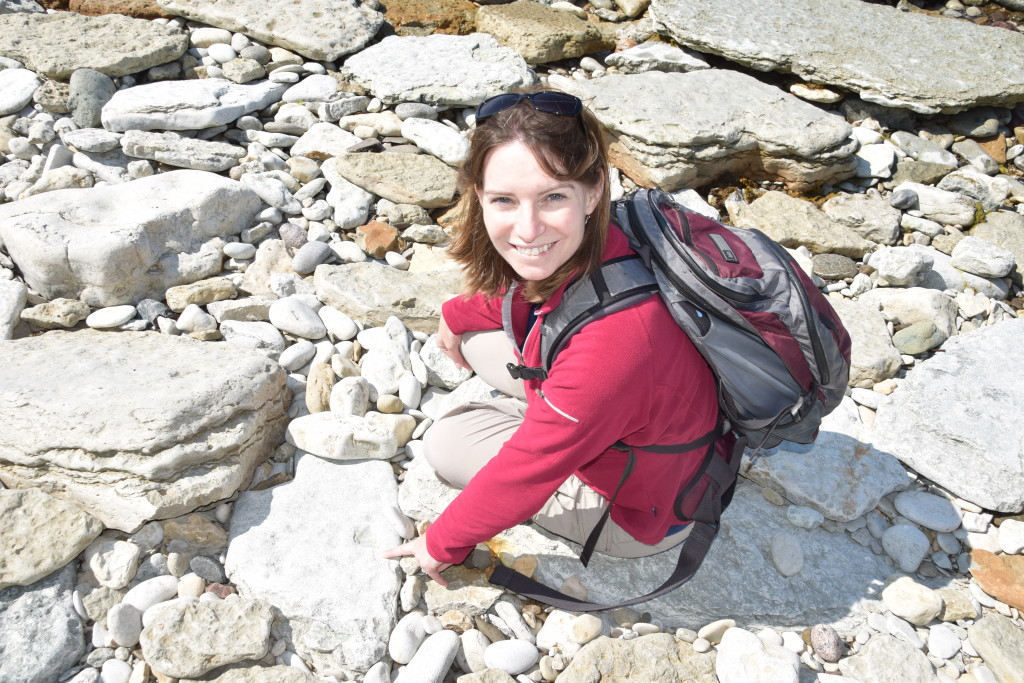
Stigall posing with Ordovician brachiopods in Estonia in 2014

As a Full professor, Stigall and her research team, consisting of Nancy Stevens and Y. Ranjeev Epa, analyzed snail fossils from 24 to 26 million years ago and identified six new species. Their study provided the first documentation of rapid evolutionary diversification in freshwater invertebrates associated with the development of rifting in the East African Rift Zone. She similarly found that The Great Biodiversification Event, in which new species developed rapidly, particularly during the Darriwilian Stage about 465 million years ago.

In 2020, Stigall collaborated with an international team to co-publish The Devonian-Cretaceous fossil record of ‘conchostracans’ of Africa and their paleobiogeographic relationships with other Gondwanan faunas in the Journal of African Earth Sciences. The study developed the first comprehensive catalog of the occurrences of fossil clam shrimp for African and the former Gondwanan continents.

Prior to the beginning of the 2020–21 academic year, Stigall was appointed Chair for the Department of Geological Sciences. In August 2022, Stigall was appointed Department Head of Earth and Planetary Sciences at the University of Tennessee, Knoxville.

Stigall has also advocated for gender equality in the field of paleontology throughout her career. In a 2013 publication, she cited the continued low membership of women in the Paleontological Society despite the increase in the amount of women in the field. Stigall also noted that a very low percentage of women paleontologists were receiving recognition or awards for their work. Stigall herself was only the fifth woman to receive the Charles Schuchert Award in 2016, although the award had been instated in 1973.

== Personal life ==
Stigall married Daniel Hembree on December 9, 2006.
