= Last Chance Range (Nevada) =

Mountain range in Nevada, United States

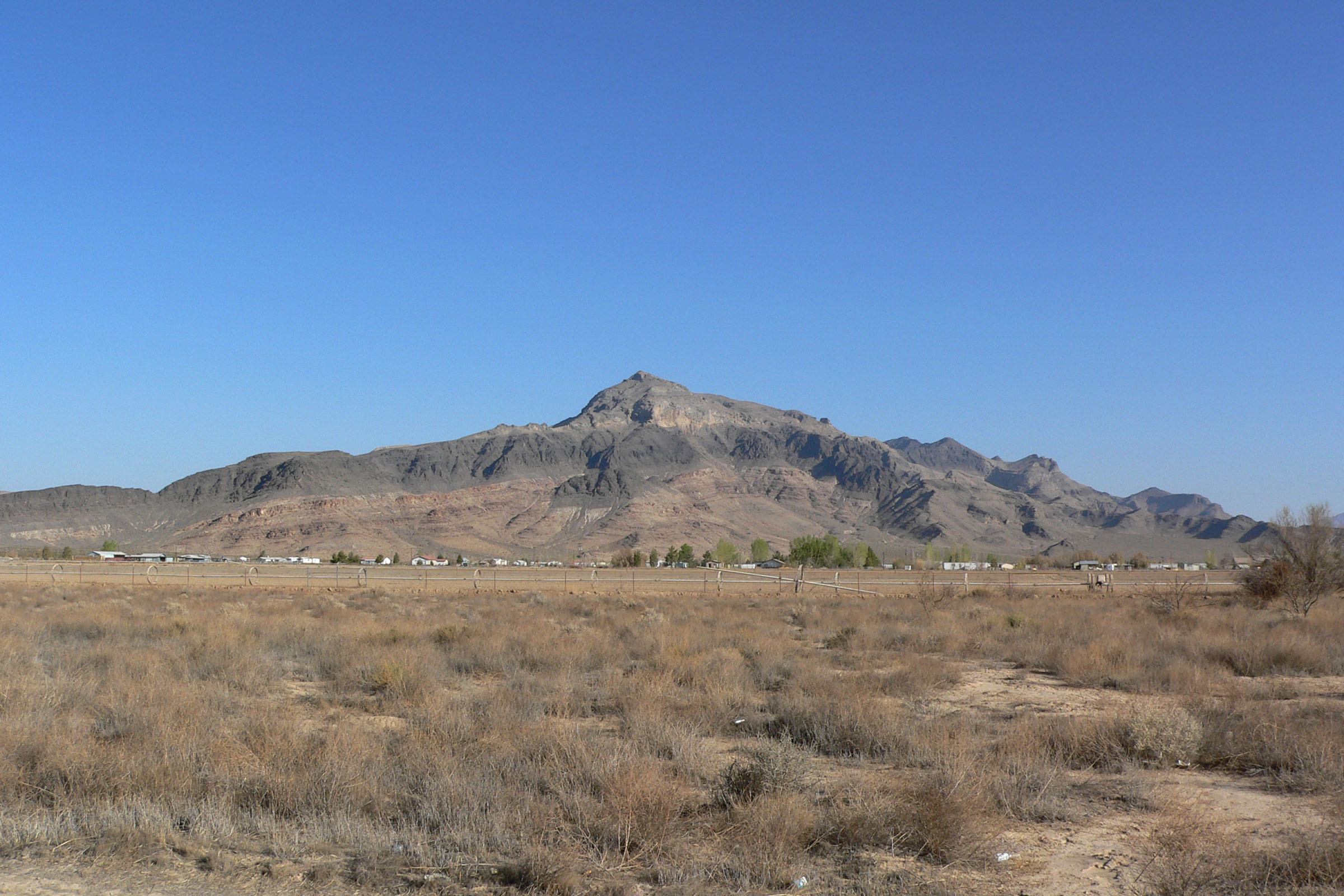
- Seen from Pahrump to the south

Highest point
- Elevation: 1,519 m (4,984 ft)

Geography
- Location within Nevada
- Country: United States
- State: Nevada
- District: Nye County
- Range coordinates: 36°18′59.850″N 116°5′23.111″W
- Topo map: USGS Last Chance Range

The Last Chance Range is a mountain range in Nye County, Nevada. It lies immediately north of Pahrump, Nevada, and west of Nevada State Route 160.
