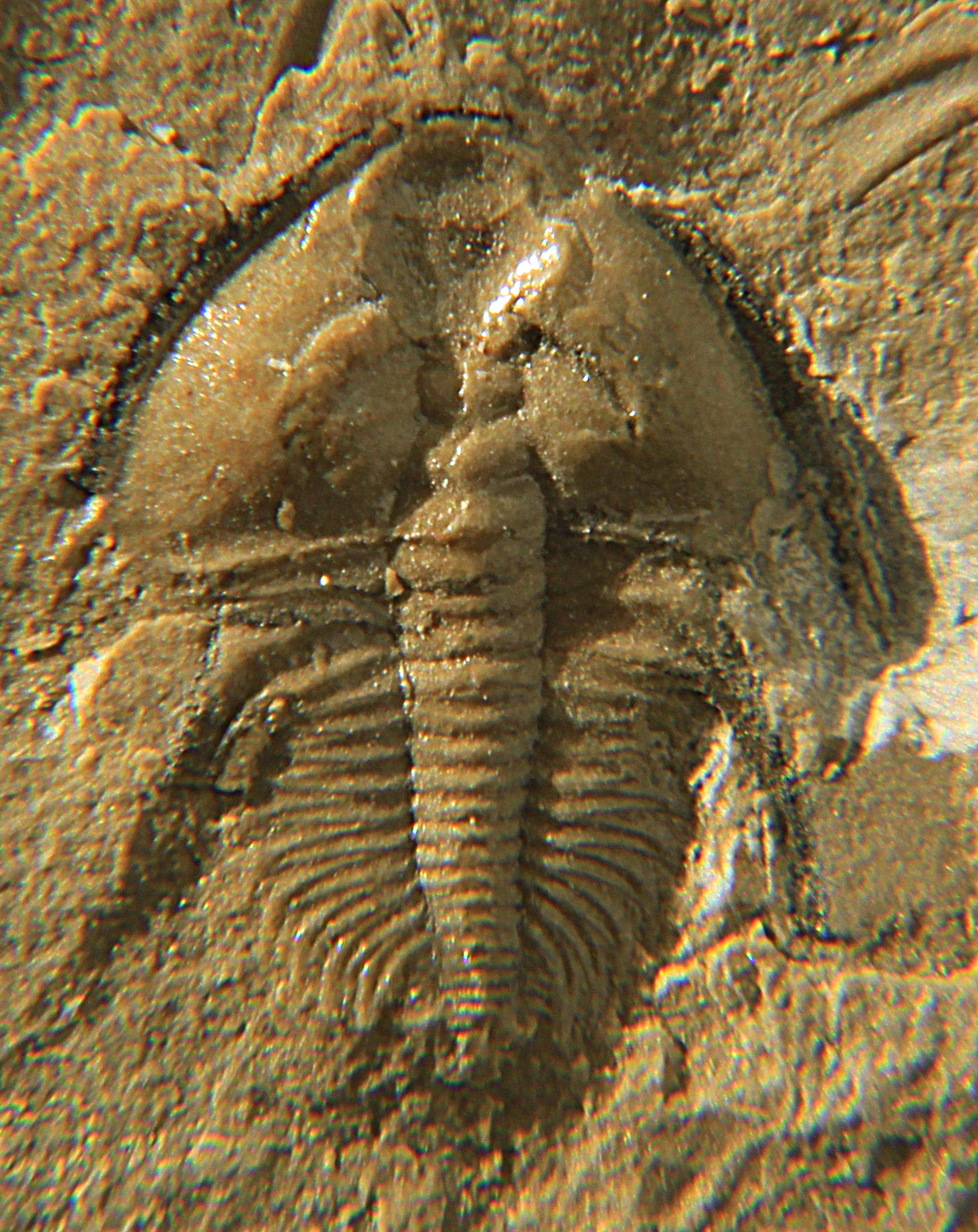
- juvenile Nephrolenellus multinodus, 9mm, frontal glabellar lobe broken

Scientific classification
- Kingdom: Animalia
- Phylum: Arthropoda
- Clade: †Artiopoda
- Class: †Trilobita
- Order: †Redlichiida
- Family: †Biceratopsidae
- Subfamily: †Biceratopsinae
- Genus: †Nephrolenellus; Palmer & Repina, 1993

Species
- Nephrolenellus multinodus (Palmer in Palmer and Halley, 1979) (Type) synonyms Olenellus multinodus, N. jasperensis; Nephrolenellus geniculatus Palmer, 1998

= Nephrolenellus =

Nephrolenellus Temporal range: Toyonian (Upper Olenellus-zone) 516–513 Ma

Genus of trilobites

Nephrolenellus is an extinct genus of trilobite, fossil marine arthropods, of relatively small size (sagittal length of cephalon rarely exceeds 11 mm). Currently two species are attributed to it. Nephrolenellus lived at the end of the Lower Cambrian. Species are known from the Great Basin of California, Nevada and Arizona, with one specimen from Canada.

== Taxonomy ==
N. geniculatus may have been a direct descendant of N. multinodus.

== Distribution ==
Nephrolenellus multinodus occurs in the late Lower Cambrian of California (Toyonian, Pyramid Shale Member, Carrara Formation, Inyo County, 35.8° N, 116.2° W). and of Nevada (Toyonian, Lincoln County; and C-Shale Member, Pioche Formation, Ruin Wash, Chief Range, 37.8° N, 114.6° W).

== Description ==
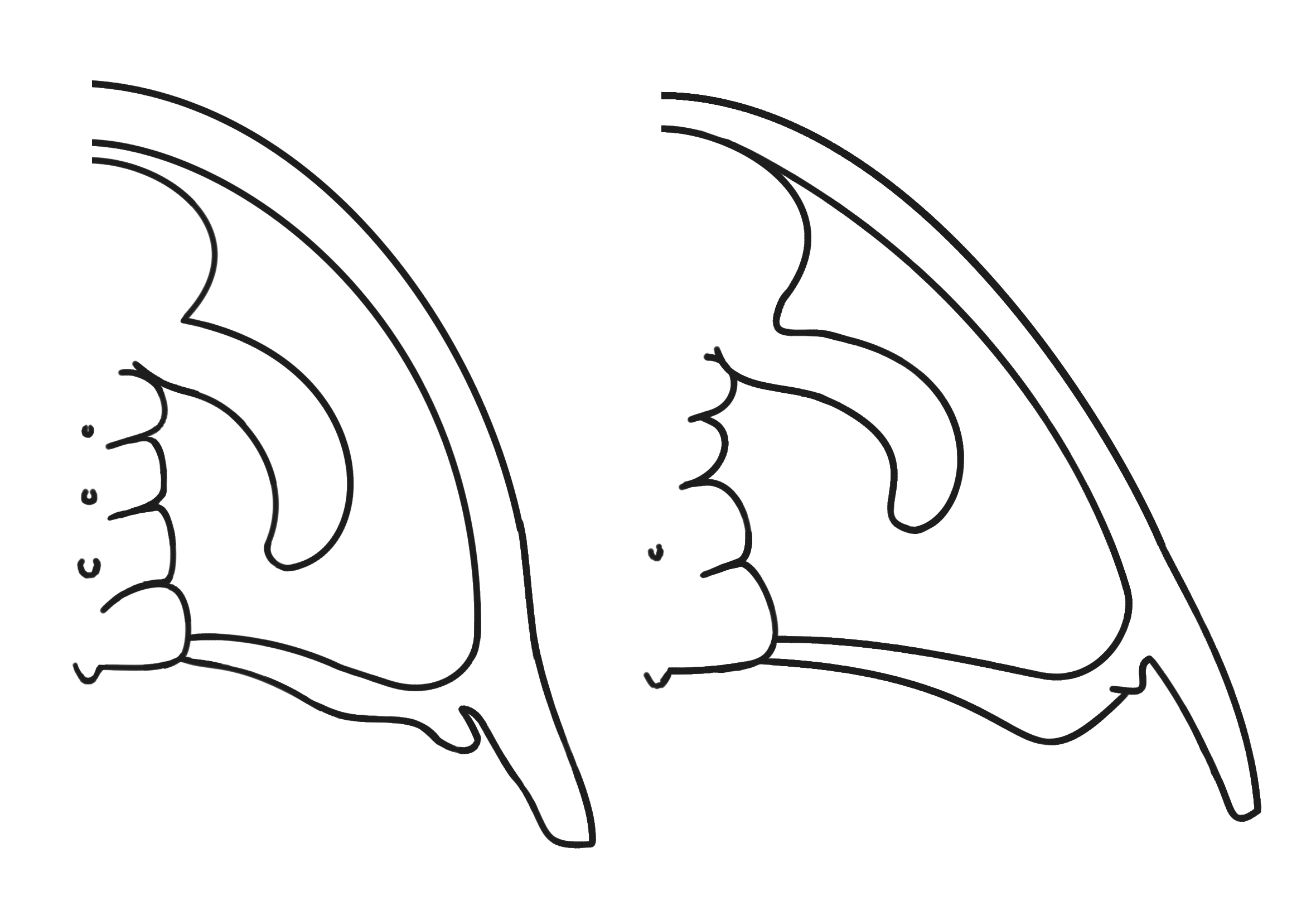
Reconstructions of N. multinodus (L), N. genticulatus (R).

As with most early trilobites, Nephrolenellus has an only thinly calcified exoskeleton. Although most of the body is rather flat, the frontal lobe (L4) of the central area of the cephalon (or glabella) is raised, but not bulbous, and does not overlap the border at the front in dorsal view. It also has the crescent-shaped ocular lobes typical for the earliest trilobites. As part of the Olenellina suborder, Nephrolenellus lacks dorsal sutures. Like all other members of the Olenelloidea superfamily, the ocular lobes extend from the back of the frontal lobe (L4) of the glabella. Typically for Nephrolenellus the eyeridges are pointing backwards and significantly (45°) outwards (along the tangent between the base and termination). The glabella is strongly constricted at the second pair of glabellar lobes (L2). The furrow between the second and third pair of lobes (S2) is transverse or gently convex anteriorly. S3 is pit-like and isolated from the furrow defining the glabella (or axial furrow). The spine at the outer backside of the cephalon is longer than the most backward lobe of the glabella (also called occipital ring or L0), and it is based at the point the cephalon is at its widest. The prothorax consists of thirteen segments, and the third segment is macropleural, each carrying a trailing spine at the side that is comparable in length to the entire exoskeleton. It lacks the long axial spine where prothorax ends. The portion of the thorax where the pleural lobes are reduced (or opisthothorax) consists of at least 23 segments.
