= Cirquella =

Cirquella Temporal range: Late Atdabanian, 524–522 Ma

Scientific classification
- Kingdom: Animalia
- Phylum: Arthropoda
- Clade: †Artiopoda
- Class: †Trilobita
- Order: †Redlichiida
- Family: †Nevadiidae
- Genus: †Cirquella; Fritz, 1993

Species
- C. nummularia Fritz, 1993 (Type); C. espinata Fritz, 1993; C. nelsoni Lieberman, 2001

Extinct genus of trilobites

Cirquella is an extinct genus from a well-known class of fossil marine arthropods, the trilobites. It lived during the Atdabanian stage, in the former continent Laurentia.

== Description ==
Only the thin and lightly calcified headshields (or cephalon) of Cirquella have ever been found. It is very flat, almost oval in outline, the length about 85% of the width. The central area of the cephalon (or glabella) is moderately tapered forward. The furrows dividing the glabella are only weakly developed. The back of the eye ridge is opposite the first lobe (L1) of the glabella in front of the band (or occipital ring) at the back of the glabella. In Cirquella espinata there is no genal spine but a slight angularity of margin opposite first lobe in front of the occipital ring. In Cirquella nummularia the rim of the cephalon is entirely rounded.

== Distribution ==
C. nummularia is known from the earliest half of the Lower Nevadella Zone, in the Dogtooth Mountains, British Columbia, Canada, and in Nevada.
C. espinata lived at the same time in the Southern Canadian Rocky Mountains.
C. nelsoni is reported from the Fallotaspis-Judomia Faunule, Fallotaspis Biozone, Campito Formation, Inyo-White Mountains, Eastern California.

== Habitat ==
Cirquella species were probably marine bottom dwellers, like all Olenellina.

== Sources ==
- Lieberman, Bruce S. (2002). "Phylogenetic analysis of some basal early Cambrian trilobites, the biogeographic origins of the Eutrilobita, and the timing of the Cambrian radiation". Journal of Paleontology. 76 (4): 692–708. doi:10.1666/0022-3360(2002)076<0692:PAOSBE>2.0.CO;2. JSTOR 1307101.
