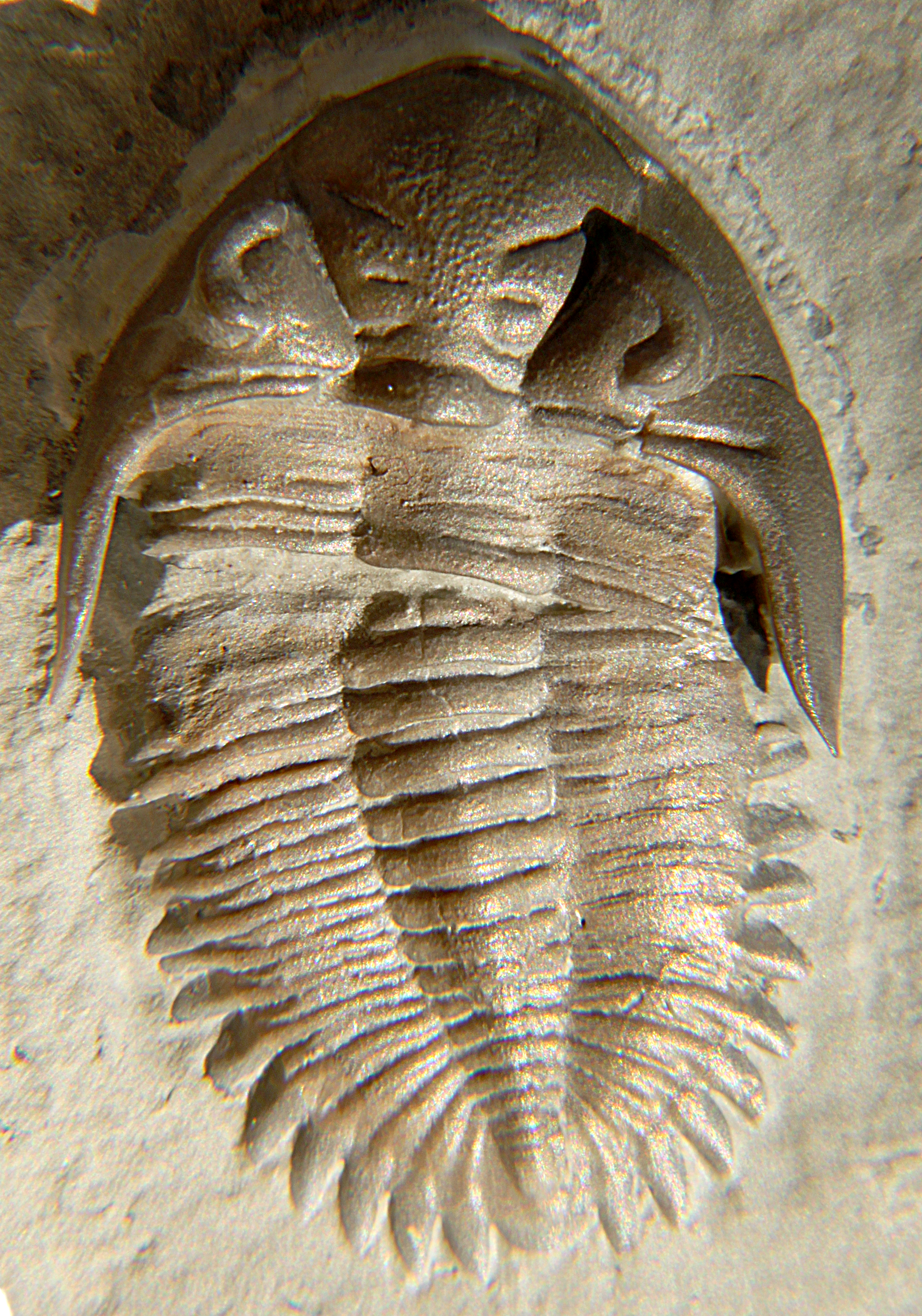
- Bellacartwrightia calliteles, 18 mm

Scientific classification
- Domain: Eukaryota
- Kingdom: Animalia
- Phylum: Arthropoda
- Class: †Trilobita
- Order: †Phacopida
- Family: †Acastidae
- Genus: †Bellacartwrightia; Lieberman & Kloc, 1997

Species
- B. jennyae Lieberman & Kloc, 1997 (type); B. calderonae Lieberman & Kloc, 1997; B. calliteles (Green 1837) = Cryphaeus calliteles; B. phyllocaudata Lieberman & Kloc, 1997; B. pleione (Hall, 1861) = Dalmania pleione, Dalmanites pleione, Greenops pleione; B. whiteleyi Lieberman & Kloc, 1997

= Bellacartwrightia =

Bellacartwrightia Temporal range: Middle Devonian

Bellacartwrightia is a relatively uncommon genus of phacopid trilobite, found in the mid-Devonian Hamilton Group of New York state, mainly in strata exposed near Lake Erie just west of Buffalo. This trilobite is usually about 1.5" to 2" long. A very similar trilobite from the Devonian of Morocco is still sold as Metacanthina, but considerable research is still being done on Moroccan trilobites.
