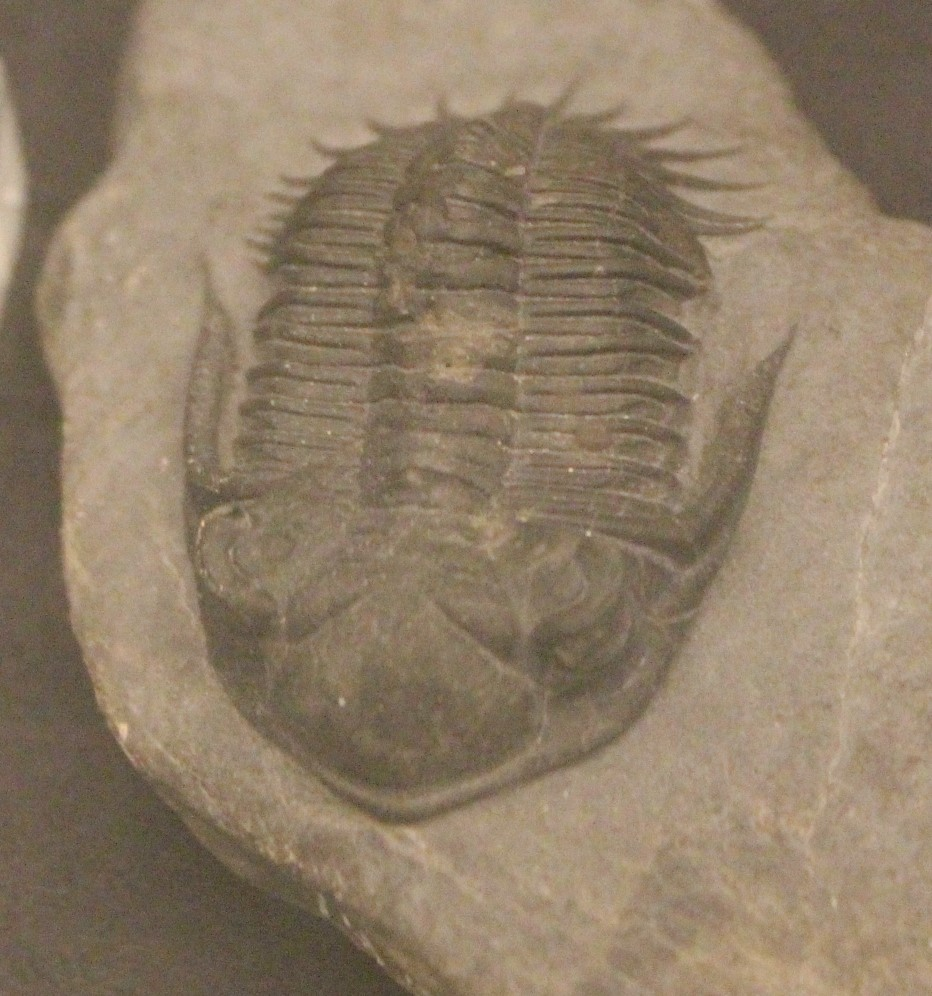
- K. kochi fossil, University of Michigan Museum of Natural History

Scientific classification
- Domain: Eukaryota
- Kingdom: Animalia
- Phylum: Arthropoda
- Class: †Trilobita
- Order: †Phacopida
- Family: †Acastidae
- Genus: †Kayserops; Delo, 1935

= Kayserops =

Kayserops is a trilobite in the order Phacopida (family Acastidae), that existed during the lower Devonian in what is now Germany. It was described by Delo in 1935, and the type species is Kayserops kochi, which was originally described under the genus Cryphaeus by Kayser in 1883. The generic name is derived from the name of the species' author. The type locality was the Rhenish Massif.
