= Laudonia =

Laudonia Temporal range: late Lower Cambrian (Lower Olenellus-zone) 524–518.5 Ma

Scientific classification
- Kingdom: Animalia
- Phylum: Arthropoda
- Class: Trilobita
- Order: Redlichiida
- Superfamily: Olenelloidea
- Family: Laudoniidae
- Subfamily: "Laudoniinae"
- Genus: Laudonia Harrington, 1956

Species
- L. bispinata Harrington, 1956, (type); L. amputata Fritz, 1992

Laudonia is an extinct genus of trilobites that lived during the early part of the Botomian stage, which lasted from approximately 524 to 518.5 million years ago. This faunal stage was part of the Cambrian Period. There are currently two named species assigned to it.

== Distribution ==
- L. bispinata has been collected from the Early Cambrian of Alberta (Lower Olenellus zone, Mural Formation, Mumm Peak Section, immediately west of Mumm Peak and north of Mount Robson Provincial Park, near Mural Glacier) and of British Columbia (Cinnamon Peak-Whitehorn Mtn. Section: Dyeran) Canada.)
- L. amputata is found in the Early Cambrian of Alberta (Lower Olenellus zone, Mural Formation, Mumm Peak Section, immediately west of Mumm Peak and north of Mount Robson Provincial Park, near Mural Glacier).
- Laudonia sp. is mentioned from the Lower Cambrian of the Caborca Region, Mexico (Puerto Blanco Formation, Cerro Rajon).
