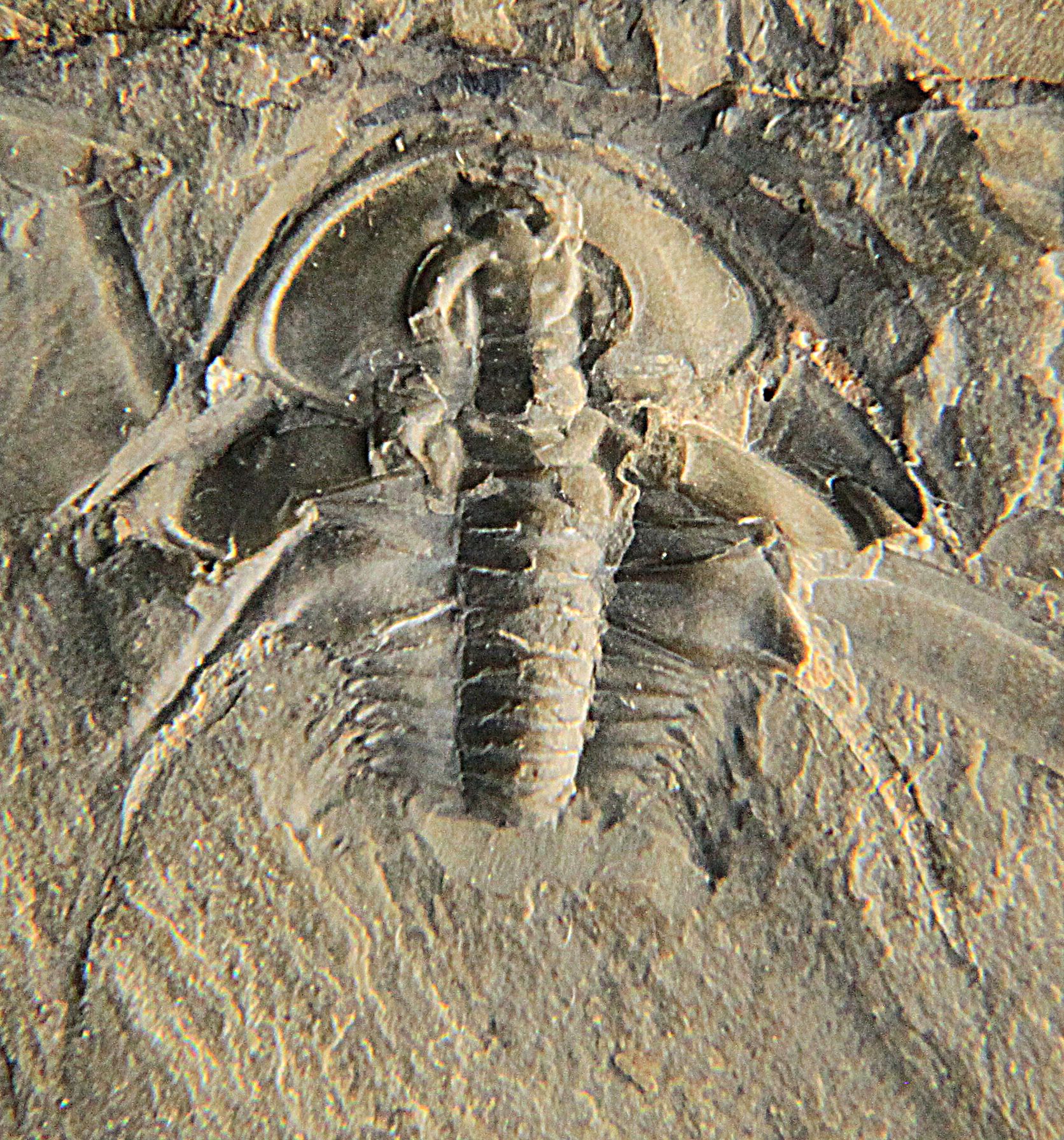
- Bristolia mohavensis, cephalon superimposed on a roled-up specimen

Scientific classification
- Domain: Eukaryota
- Kingdom: Animalia
- Phylum: Arthropoda
- Class: †Trilobita
- Order: †Redlichiida
- Family: †Biceratopsidae
- Subfamily: †Bristoliinae; Harrington, 1956

Genera
- Bristolia Harrington, 1956; Fremontella Harrington, 1956; Lochmanolenellus Lieberman, 1998

= Bristoliinae =

Bristoliinae Temporal range: late Lower Cambrian (Olenellus-zone) 522–513 Ma

Extinct subfamily of trilobites

The Bristoliinae is an extinct subfamily of trilobites, fossil marine arthropods, with species of small to average size. Species belonging to this subfamily lived during the Botomian and Toyonian stage (Olenellus-zone), 522-513 million years ago, in the former continent of Laurentia, including what are today Mexico, the Appalachian Mountains and the south-western United States, and Canada (Northwest Territories).

== Etymology ==
The Bristoliinae are named for the type species Bristolia bristolensis.

== Description ==
The headshield (or cephalon) carries spines (called genal spines) of approximately 4-8 thorax segments long (measured parallel to the midline). The genal spines are attached in front of the back of the headshield. The central raised portion of the cephalon that represents the axis in the cephalon (or glabella) touches the flattened ledge that borders the cephalon. The furrows that separate border, eye ridges, glabella and its lobes are distinct.

=== Communalities and differences with Biceratopsinae ===
The Bristolinae can be distinguished from its sister subfamily, the Biceratopsinae, that has effaced cephalic features (no furrows except for the border furrow).

== Distribution ==
All Bristoliinae occur in the late Lower Cambrian (Olenellus-zone) of the former paleocontinent Laurentia. Fremontella halli is known from eastern Laurentia (Rome Formation, Alabama, USA). All other species are known from western Laurentia: Lochmanolenellus mexicana from northern Mexico and South-East California, the species of Bristolia from southeastern California and southern Nevada, and an undescribed Bristolia-species from the North-West Territories, Canada.

== Habitat ==
The Bristolinae were probably marine bottom dwellers, like all Olenellina.
