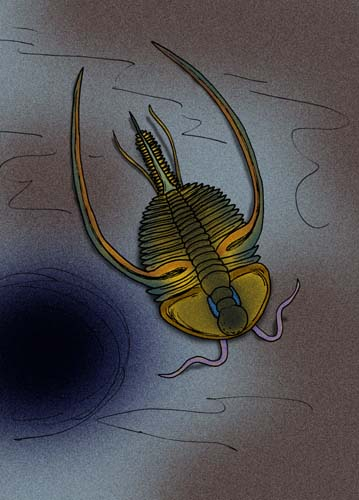
- Biceratops nevadensis

Scientific classification
- Kingdom: Animalia
- Phylum: Arthropoda
- Clade: †Artiopoda
- Class: †Trilobita
- Order: †Redlichiida
- Family: †Biceratopsidae
- Subfamily: †Biceratopsinae
- Genus: †Biceratops; Pack and Gayle, 1971

Species
- B. nevadensis Pack and Gayle, 1971

= Biceratops =

Biceratops Temporal range: Toyonian (Upper Olenellus-zone) 516–513 Ma

Biceratops is an extinct genus of olenelloid redlichiid trilobites, of average size, with the largest specimen 8 centimetres or 3.1 inches long, not including the huge pleural spines of the 3rd segment of the thorax. It lived during the Toyonian stage (last phase of the Upper Olenellus-zone), in what is today the South-Western United States. Biceratops can easily be distinguished from other members of Biceratopsidae by the absence of genal spines, in combination with effaced features of the raised axial area of the head shield (or glabella), that is bordering the two horn-like projections that carry the eyes. Biceratops nevadensis is the only known species in this genus (i.e. the genus is monotypic).

== Etymology ==
The name of the genus is derived from Latin and means ‘two horned-eyes’. The species epithet refers to the US state where it was collected.

== Description ==
As with most early trilobites, Biceratops has an almost flat exoskeleton, that is only thinly calcified. It also shares crescent-shaped eye ridges, but these rise above the exoskeleton. As part of the Olenellina suborder, Biceratops lacks dorsal sutures. Like all other members of the Olenelloidea superfamily, the eye-ridges spring from the back of the frontal lobe (L4) of the central area of the cephalon, that is called glabella. The exoskeleton of Biceratops is ovate in outline and up to 8 cm in length, disregarding the huge pleural spines of the 3rd thorax segment. The head shield (or cephalon) is semicircular to subtriangular, about twice as wide as long. It has a distinct cephalic border. The glabella is hourglass-shaped and the furrows are indistinct. The small eyes are set on the vertical outside surface of the eyelobes (or palpebral lobes), that extend upwards and backwards above the glabella. The cheeks (or genae) are clearly convex. The thorax is about as long as wide and shaped as a shield. The frontal thorax (or prothorax) has 15 segments, the last of which carries a firm, long, backward-directed spine. The 3rd thorax segment is enlarged, the pleura at the axis slightly longer than that of other segments, and about four times as long at the side removed from the axis. Neighbouring pleurae are displaced because of the large pleurae of the 3rd segment. The back thorax (or opistothorax) consists of about 10 progressively smaller segments with insignificant pleurae. Tail shield (or pygidium) not known.

=== Differences with other Biceratopsinae ===
All other Biceratopsinae have genal spines.

== Distribution ==
Biceratops nevadensis is known only from the lower part of the Pioche Shale (Upper Olenellus-zone) at the base of the Frenchman Mountain, Clark County, Nevada.

== Habitat ==
Biceratops nevadensis was probably a marine bottom dweller, like all Olenellina.

== Ecology ==
Biceratops nevadensis occurs together with Olenellus fowleri, O. gilberti, O. terminatus and Mesonacis fremonti.
