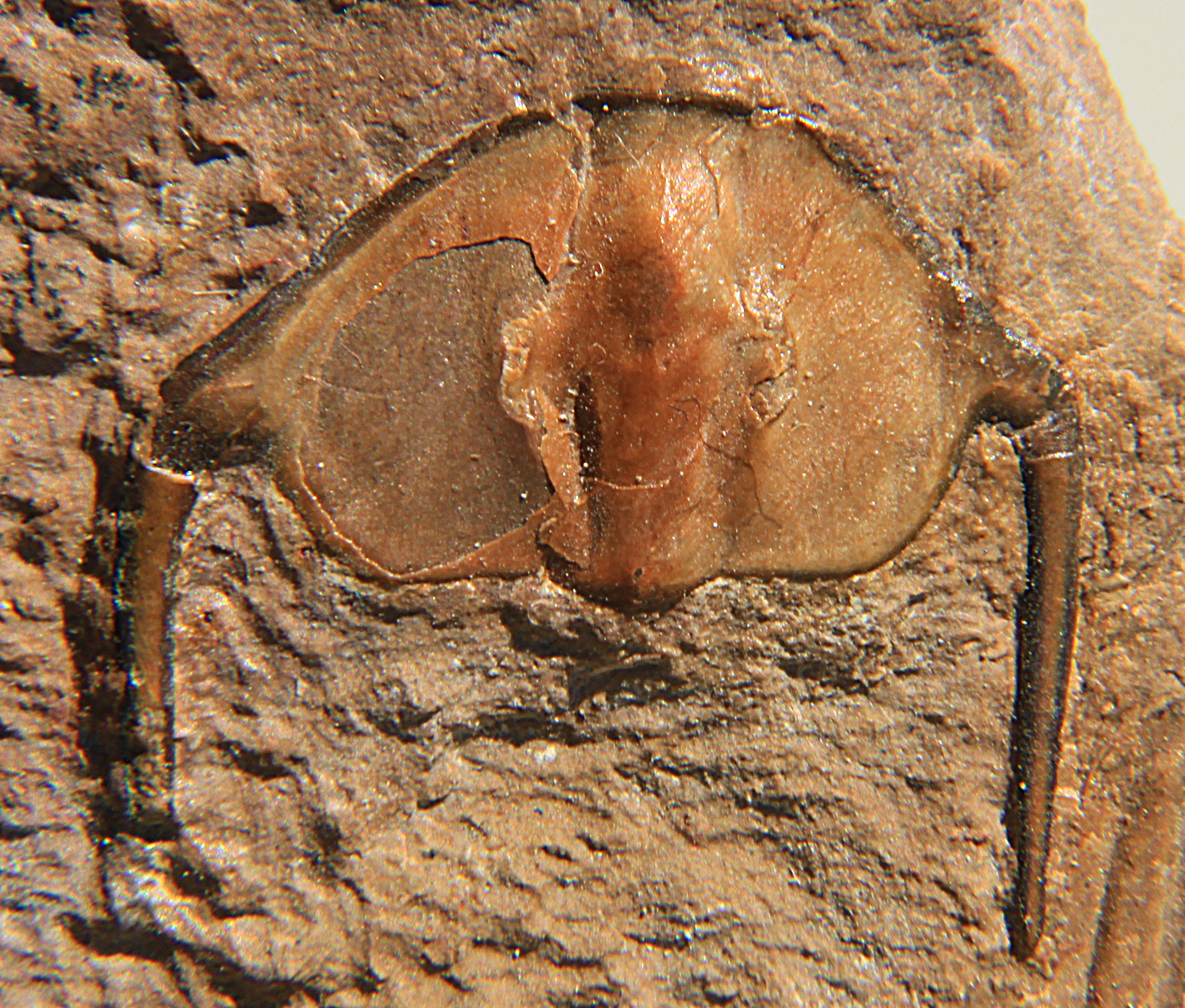
- Emigrantia sp., a cephalon

Scientific classification
- Kingdom: Animalia
- Phylum: Arthropoda
- Clade: †Artiopoda
- Class: †Trilobita
- Order: †Redlichiida
- Family: †Biceratopsidae
- Subfamily: †Biceratopsinae (Pack & Gayle, 1971)

Genera
- Biceratops Pack & Gayle, 1971 (Type); Bolbolenellus Palmer and Repina, 1993; Emigrantia nomen nudum; Eopeachella Webster, 2009; Nephrolenellus Palmer and Repina, 1993; Olenelloides (Peach, 1894); Paranephrolenellus Webster, 2007; Peachella (Walcott, 1910)

= Biceratopsinae =

Biceratopsinae Temporal range: Toyonian (Upper Olenellus-zone) 516–513 Ma

Extinct subfamily of trilobites

The Biceratopsinae is an extinct subfamily of redlichiid trilobites within the family Biceratopsidae, with species of small to average size. Species belonging to this subfamily lived during the Toyonian stage (Upper Olenellus-zone), 516-513 million years ago, in the former continent of Laurentia, including what are today the South-Western United States and Canada.

== Etymology ==
The Biceratopsinae are named for the type species Biceratops nevadensis.

== Habitat ==
The Biceratopsinae were probably marine bottom dweller, like all Olenellina.
