= Trilobite zone =

Index fossils to subdivide the Cambrian period

Trilobites are used as index fossils to subdivide the Cambrian period. Assemblages of trilobites define trilobite zones. The Olenellus-zone has traditionally marked the top of the Lower Cambrian, and is followed by the Eokochaspis zone.

The last two zones of the Middle Cambrian are the Bathyuriscus–Elrathina-zone (contemporaneous with the Burgess Shale) and the subsequent Bolaspidella-zone (starting at the base of the Drumian stage). These are overlain by the lowermost Upper Cambrian Cedaria-zone.

Alternative zoning names place the Burgess Shale in the Peronopsis bonnerensis-zone, which is underlain by the Oryctocephalus indicus-zone (e.g. Spence Shale) and overlain (perhaps not directly) by the Ptychagnostus punctuosus-zone.

The lower Middle Cambrian Glossopleura-zone (Spence Shale) is above the Albertella-zone.

The Elvinia-zone is upper Cambrian.

Series	Stage	Trilobite zone	Trilobite GSSP
Furongian	Stage 10	Saukia-zone (upper part), Eurekia apopsis-zone, Tangshanaspis-Zone, Parakoldinioidia-zone, Symphysurina-zone	Lotagnostus americanus (undecided)
Furongian	Jiangshanian	Ellipsocephaloides-zone, Saukia-zone (lower part)	Agnostotes orientalis
Furongian	Paibian	? (?)	Glyptagnostus reticulatus
Furongian	Paibian	Cedaria	Glyptagnostus reticulatus
Miaolingian	Guzhangian	Bolaspidella ( / Ptychagnostus praecurrens ?? ).	Lejopyge laevigata
Miaolingian	Drumian	Bolaspidella ( / Ptychagnostus praecurrens ?? ).	Ptychagnostus atavus
Miaolingian	Wuliuan	Bathyuriscus–Elrathina (?)	Oryctocephalus indicus
Miaolingian	Wuliuan	Eokochaspis	Oryctocephalus indicus
Series 2	Stage 4	Olenellus	Olenellus or Redlichia (undecided)
Series 2	Stage 3	Olenellus	
Series 2	Stage 3	Fallotaspis, Nevadella	First appearance of trilobites (undecided)
Terreneuvian (Pre-Trilobitic Cambrian)	Stage 2	?	
Terreneuvian (Pre-Trilobitic Cambrian)	Fortunian		

== Subdivision of the Olenellus-zone ==
Recently, it has been proposed to subdivide the Olenellus-zone. The following zones have been proposed to replace the Upper Olenellus-zone. Each lower boundary is defined by the first occurrence of the naming species. Each upper boundary is defined by the first occurrence of the naming species of the overlying zone. In case of the youngest zone, this is Eokochaspis nodosa, that also marks the base of the Wuliuan.

- Nephrolenellus multinodus-zone (youngest).

Species: Nephrolenellus multinodus (lower half), Mesonacis fremonti, Olenellus terminatus s.l., Olenellus puertoblancoensis s.l., Olenellus fowleri s.l., Olenellus gilberti, Bolbolenellus brevispinus (not the lower part), Olenellus chiefensis (upper half), Olenellus sp.1 (upper half), Nephrolenellus geniculatus (upper part), Olenellus sp.2 (upper part), Olenellus howelli (very uppermost part).

- Bolbolenellus euryparia-zone.

Species: Bolbolenellus euryparia (lower half), Mesonacis fremonti, Bristolia fragilis s.l. (lower half), Olenellus terminatus s.l., Olenellus fowleri s.l., Olenellus puertoblancoensis s.l., Olenellus gilberti (uppermost part), Biceratops nevadensis (uppermost part), Bristolia brachyomma (very uppermost part).

- Peachella iddingsi-zone.

Species: Peachella iddingsi (lower half), Mesonacis fremonti, Olenellus nevadensis (lower part), Bristolia anteros (lowest half), Bristolia fragilis s.l., Olenellus terminatus s.l., Paranephrolenellus besti (very short period in the late lower part), Peachella brevispina (middle part).

- Bristolia insolens-zone.

Species: Bristolia insolens (lower half), Mesonacis fremonti, Olenellus nevadensis, Olenellus clarki, Olenellus sp.3, Paranephrolenellus klondykensis (lowest part), Bristolia harringtoni (middle part), Bristolia bristolensis (lower half), Bristolia anteros (not lowest part), Bristolia fragilis s.l. (upper half), Paranephrolenellus inflatus (very short interval in the middle), Eopeachella angustispina (uppermost part).

- Bristolia mohavensis-zone.

Species: Bristolia mohavensis (lower half), Mesonacis fremonti, Olenellus nevadensis, Olenellus clarki, Olenellus sp.3, Bristolia harringtoni (middle part), Bristolia bristolensis (upper half).

- Arcuolenellus arcuatus-zone (oldest).

Species: Arcuolenellus arcuatus (lowest part), Arcuolenellus aff. megafrontatis (lower half), Mesonacis cylindricus (not the highest part), Olenellus nevadensis, Olenellus clarki (not lowest part), Mesonacis fremonti (upper half), Olenellus sp.3 (upper part).
