= Biceratopsidae =

Biceratopsidae Temporal range: Botomian/Toyonian (Olenellus-zone) 522–513 Ma

Scientific classification
- Kingdom: Animalia
- Phylum: Arthropoda
- Clade: †Artiopoda
- Class: †Trilobita
- Order: †Redlichiida
- Suborder: †Olenellina
- Superfamily: †Olenelloidea
- Family: †Biceratopsidae; Pack & Gayle, 1971

Subfamilies
- Biceratopsinae Pack & Gayle, 1971; Bristoliinae Harrington, 1956

Extinct family of trilobites

Biceratopsidae is an extinct family of redlichiid trilobites, with species of small to average size. Species of belonging to this family lived during the Toyonian stage (Olenellus-zone), 522–513 million years ago, in the former continent of Laurentia, including what are today the south-western United States and Canada. It contains the subfamilies Biceratopsinae and Bristoliinae.

== Habitat ==
The Biceratopsidae were probably marine bottom dweller, like all Olenellina.
