= Mesolenellus =

Mesolenellus Temporal range: 516–513 Ma Botomian

Scientific classification
- Domain: Eukaryota
- Kingdom: Animalia
- Phylum: Arthropoda
- Class: †Trilobita
- Order: †Redlichiida
- Family: †Olenellidae
- Subfamily: †Mesonacinae
- Genus: †Mesolenellus; Palmer & Repina, 1993

Species
- Mesolenellus hyperborea (Poulsen, 1974) type species, synonyms Olenellus hyperborea, Holmia hyperborea; Mesolenellus svalbardensis (Kielan, 1960), synonym Olenellus svalbardensis

Extinct genus of trilobites

Mesolenellus is an extinct genus of trilobites that lived during the lower Cambrian (Botomian), found in Greenland and Spitsbergen.

== Etymology ==
Mesolenellus is a contraction of meso 'middle' and Olenellus, the genus from which it was split off. The epithet hyperborea is a contraction of hyper (Greek ὑπέρ 'excess') and Boreas (Greek: Βορέας), god of the North Wind in Greek mythology, referencing the current geographical position of the deposits of its type location. M. svalbardensis has been named for the Norwegian island group Svalbard or Spitsbergen, where it was originally collected.

== Taxonomy ==
It was considered a subgenus of Olenellus before. The nearest relatives of Mesolenellus are the species of the genus Mesonacis, with which it constitutes the subfamily Mesonacinae.

== Distribution ==
- Mesolenellus hyperborea occurs in the Botomian (Nevadella-zone) of the paleocontinent Laurentia, now Greenland (Upper Buen Formation, above Brillesø, 1.5 km east of Borglum Elv, Peary Land, North-Eastern end of the island). The occurrence of M. hyperborea has been specified as the early mudstone layer of the Upper Buen Formation. The famous Sirius Passet fauna (e.g. Kleptothule and Aaveqaspis) occurs in the lowest (sandy) member of the Buen Formation and thus predates Mesolenellus.
- M. svalbardensis has been found in the Botomian (Nevadella-zone) of Laurentia, now Svalbard/Spitsbergen (lower Slakli Series, Sofiekammen Formation, northern side of the Hornsund, West-Spitsbergen). A specimen that probably belongs to M. svalbardensis or is closely related was found in Greenland (Schley Fjord Formation, Peary land). There is a further mention of the occurrence in Greenland for the late mudstone layer of the Upper Buen Formation, indicating that M. hyperborea predated M. svalbardensis.

== Habitat ==
The mudstone in which both species were found indicates deeper, quiet waters.

== Ecology ==
Mesolenellus hyperborea occurs together with Limniphacos perspiculum, Serrodiscus, hyoliths, Petrianna fulmenta (Bradoriida), and inarticulate brachiopods.

== Description ==
As with most early trilobites, Mesolenellus has an almost flat exoskeleton, that is only thinly calcified, and has crescent-shaped eye ridges. As part of the suborder Olenellina, Olenellus lacks dorsal sutures. Like all other members of the superfamily Olenelloidea, the eye-ridges spring from the back of the frontal lobe (L4) of the central area of the cephalon, that is called glabella. Mesolenellus also shares the typical character of the whole family Olenellidae that the frontal (L3) and middle pair (L2) of lateral lobes of the glabella are partially merged. This creates two very typical, isolated slits. Mesolenellus is a genus within the Mesonacinae, with eye-ridges curved but almost parallel to the midline. The back of the eye-ridges is opposite the most backward ring of the glabella (L0 or occipital ring). Genal spines are 6-8 times as long as L0. The outer furrows of the glabella are parallel to the midline between the back of the cephalon and the furrow between side lobes L2 and L3. The thorax is 3 times as wide as the axis at the 3rd segment. Mesolenellus can be distinguished from the sister-genus Mesonacis, where the back of the eye-ridge extends only to the most backward side lobes (L1), genal spines are only 1-5 times as long as L0, and the glabella widens forwards along L1 and L2. Except for in Mesonacis fremonti the curved eye-ridges are at an angle of 15°-20° with the midline. A third genus Olenellus, that constitutes the second subfamily of the family Olenellidae differs from Mesolenellus in having genal spines 4-5 times as long as L0, the glabella widens forwards along L1 and L2, and the thorax 4-4½ times wider that the axis at the 3rd segment.

== Key to the species ==
1	A short ridge (called plectrum) connects the frontal lobe of the glabella with the frontal border of the headshield. The section of the border of the back of the head (posterior cephalic border) halfway between the midline and the genal angle (between the axis and the intergenal angle) has a backward angle. The base of the genal spine is opposite the most backward ring of the glabella (L0). The furrow between the 2nd and 3rd ring (S2) does not contact the furrow that outlines the glabella (or axial furrow). Nevadella-zone. Svalbard (Vestspitsbergen, Hornsund) and Greenland (Peary Land, Schley Fjord Formation and Buen Formation). → M. svalbardensis (Kielan, 1960)
-	Plectrum absent. The midsection of the posterior cephalic border is transverse. The base of the genal spine is opposite the middle ring of the glabella (L2). S2 contacts the axial furrow. Nevadella-zone. Greenland (Buen Formation). → M. hyperborea (Poulsen, 1974)
