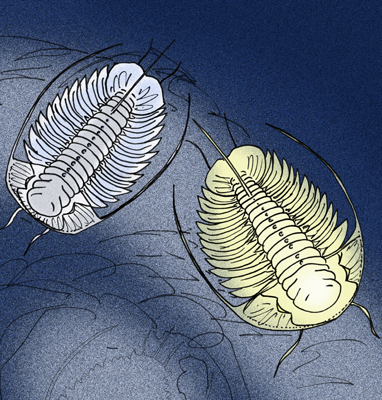
- Balnibarbi pulvurea, and B. erugata

Scientific classification
- Kingdom: Animalia
- Phylum: Arthropoda
- Clade: †Artiopoda
- Class: †Trilobita
- Order: †Ptychopariida
- Family: †Olenidae
- Genus: †Balnibarbi; Fortey, 1974

Species
- See text

= Balnibarbi (trilobite) =

Balnibarbi Temporal range: Early Arenig

Extinct genus of trilobites

Balnibarbi is an extinct genus of trilobites in the family Olenidae. They are known from fossils excavated in Norway. They lived during the early part of the Arenig stage of the Ordovician Period, a faunal stage that occurred about 479 to 472 million years ago.

The genus is ancestral to, and co-existed sympatrically with, the better-known Cloacaspis.

It was named for the fictional country of Balnibarbi featured in Gulliver's Travels, a place "populated by eccentric natural philosophers."

Species include:

- Balnibarbi ceryx
- Balnibarbi erugata
- Balnibarbi pulvurea
- Balnibarbi scimitar
- Balnibarbi sombrero
- Balnibarbi tholia
