= Fremontia =

Fremontia is a common name for Fremontodendron, a plant genus in the family Malvaceae, formerly known scientifically by the illegitimate name Fremontia Torr., published in 1851

Fremontia may also refer to:

- Fremontia Raw, a synonym of Mesonacis, an extinct genus of trilobite
- Fremontia Torr., published in 1845, now considered a synonym of Sarcobatus (Greasewood), a plant genus in the family Sarcobataceae (formerly in Chenopodiaceae)
- Fremontia, the journal of the California Native Plant Society
