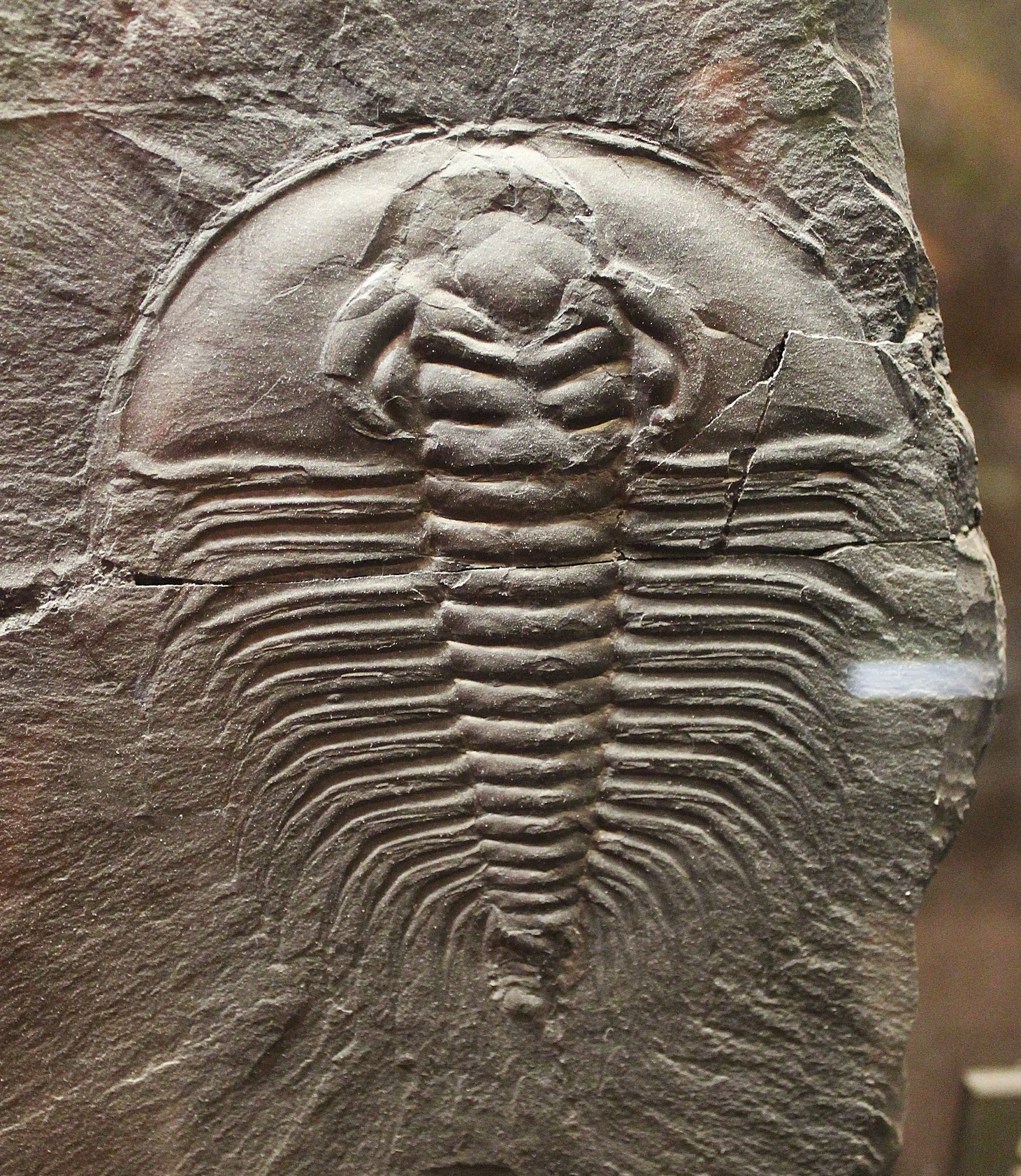
- Olenellus transitans, National Museum of Natural History

Scientific classification
- Kingdom: Animalia
- Phylum: Arthropoda
- Clade: †Artiopoda
- Class: †Trilobita
- Order: †Redlichiida
- Family: †Olenellidae
- Subfamily: †Olenellinae
- Genus: †Olenellus; Billings, 1861

Species
- O. agellus Resser & Howell, 1938; O. chiefensis Palmer, 1998; O. clarki (Resser, 1928), O. crassimarginatus Walcott, 1910, O. fowleri Palmer, 1998; O. getzi Dunbar, 1925, O. howelli Meek, 1874; O. nevadensis (Walcott, 1910), O. parvofrontatus Fritz, 1991; O. puertoblancoensis Lochman, 1952; O. robsonensis Burling, 1916, O. roddyi Resser & Howell, 1938, O. romensis Resser & Howell, 1938, O. santuccii Webster in Webster & Caron, 2024; O. terminatus Palmer, 1998; O. thompsoni (Hall, 1859) (Type); O. transitans (Walcott, 1910),

Synonyms
- Callavia nevadensis - synonym of O. nevadensis; Olenellus alius - synonym of O. getzi; Olenellus brachycephalus - synonym of O. transitans; Olenellus buttsi - synonym of O. romensis; Olenellus jonasae - synonym of O. roddyii; Olenellus latilimbatus - synonym of O. crassimarginatus; Olenellus nitidus - synonym of O. roddyii; Olenellus nodosus - synonym of O. roddyii; Olenellus peculiaris - synonym of O. getzi; Olenellus similaris - synonym of O. roddyii; Olenellus thompsoni crassimarginatus - synonym of O. crassimarginatus; Olenellus wanneri - synonym of O. crassimarginatus; Paedeumias clarki - synonym of O. clarki; Paedeumias eboracense - synonym of O. roddyii; Paedeumias glabrum - synonym of O. roddyii; Paedeumias nevadensis - synonym of O. nevadensis; Paedeumias perkinsi - synonym of O. transitans; Paedeumias robsonensis - synonym of O. robsonensis; Paedeumias yorkense - synonym of O. roddyii

= Olenellus =

Olenellus Temporal range: Botomian/Toyonian (Olenellus-zone)

Extinct genus of trilobites

Olenellus is an extinct genus of redlichiid trilobites, with species of average size (about 5 centimetres or 2.0 inches long). It lived during the Botomian and Toyonian stages of the Lower Cambrian (Olenellus-zone), 522 to 510 million years ago, in what is currently North America, part of the palaeocontinent Laurentia.

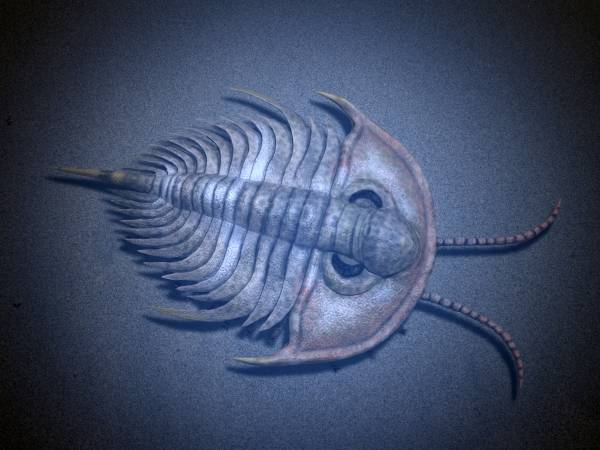
Life reconstruction of Olenellus thompsoni

== Etymology ==
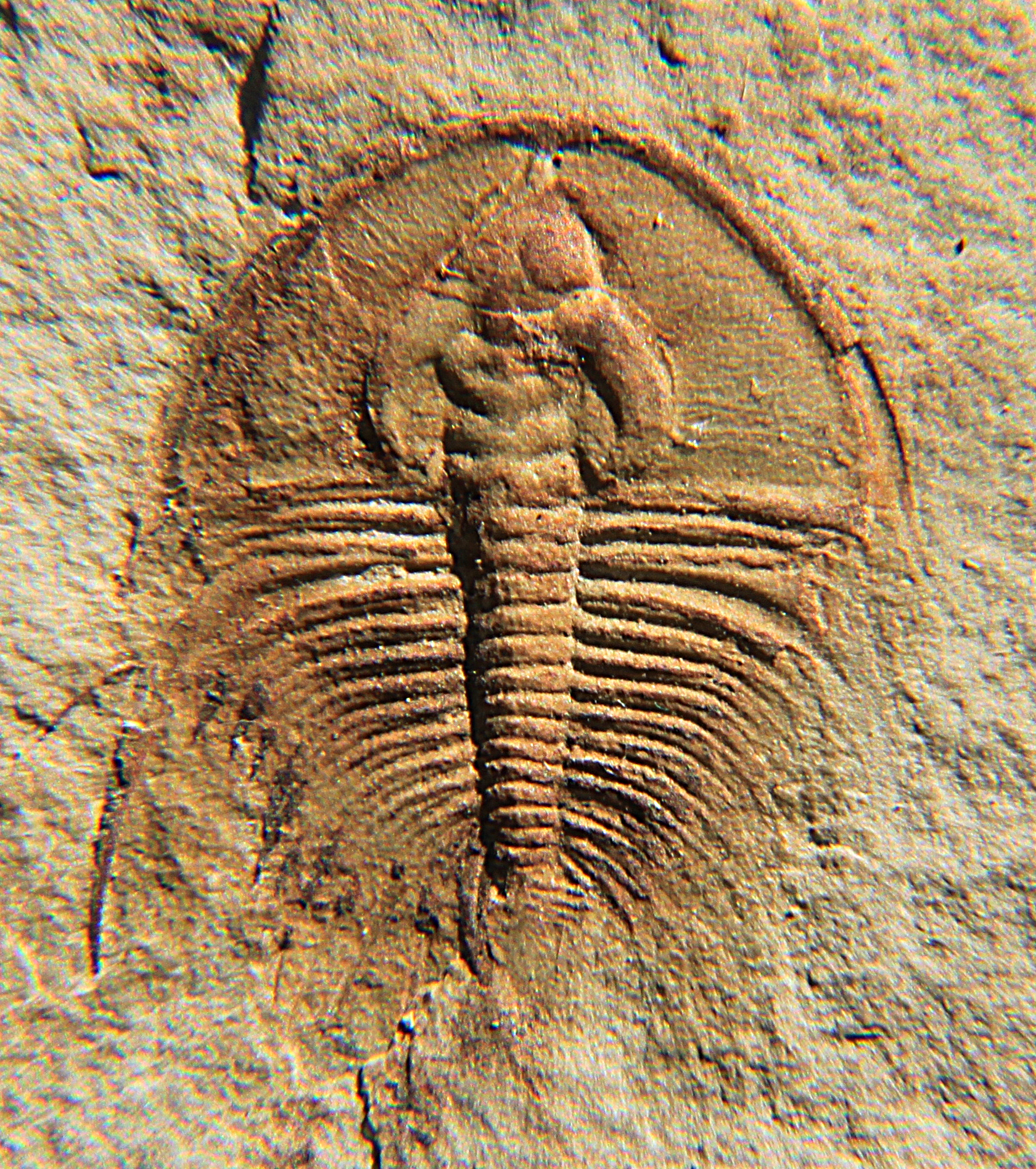
Olenellus fowleri was named in honor of Ed Fowler

Olenellus means small Olenus, after a genus belonging to the Ptychopariida, to which the type species O. thompsoni was originally assigned. The name Olenus refers to a mythological figure who was turned to stone by the gods. The names of the species have the following derivations.

- agellus comes from the Latin word for field or hamlet.
- chiefensis refers to the Chief Range, which includes the Ruin Wash section, that holds the last of the Olenellina.
- fowleri was named in honor of Ed Fowler, whose quarrying skills exposed the type locality of this species.
- getzi is called after Noah L. Getz, on whose Lancaster estate several Olenellus species were first collected.
- nevadensis refers to the state of Nevada, where this species is found.
- parvofrontatus means ‘small front’ from the Latin words parvus and frontatus, indicating the short distance between the anterior border and the glabella in this species.
- roddyi was named in honor of Dr. H. Justin Roddy (1856-1943), an internationally known naturalist, curator and professor of geology.
- romensis refers to the Rome Formation.
- terminatus is from the Latin terminus, meaning final, indicating the demise of the Olenellus lineage.

== Taxonomy ==
=== Relationship within the Olenellidae ===
Olenellus is the only genus currently recognised in the subfamily Olenellinae. The sister group called the Mesonacinae consists of the genera Mesonacis and Mesolenellus.

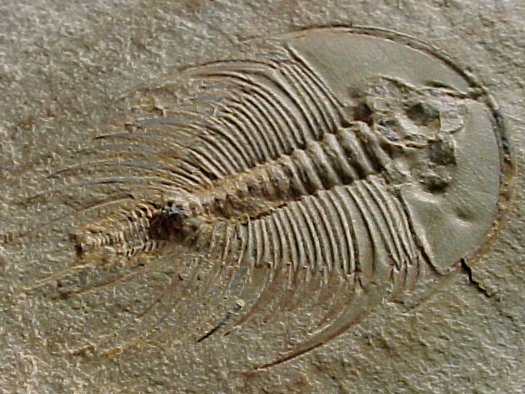
Olenellus fowleri collected from the Pioche Shale, Lincoln County, Nevada.

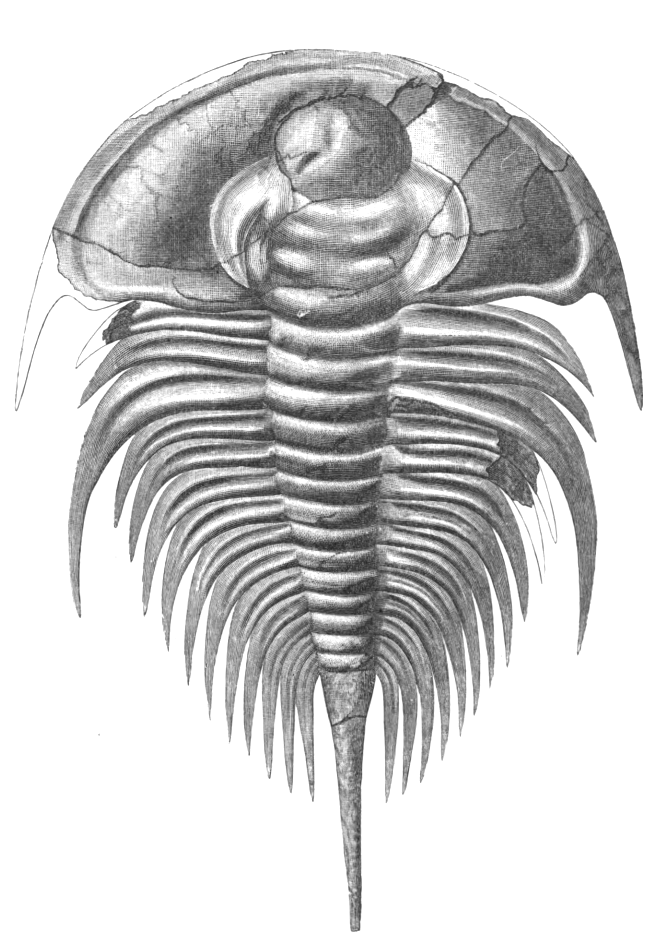
Olenellus thompsoni

=== Status of the clade "Paedeumias" ===
"Paedeumias" was previously regarded as a genus related to Olenellus or a subgenus being part of Olenellus. Recent analysis shows that there is a group of species formerly assigned to Olenellus (Paedeumias) nested within Olenellus (O. clarki, O. nevadensis, O. parvofrontatus, O. roddyi and O. transitans). However, this group is more closely related to the majority of the remainder of Olenellus species than to O. agellus and O. romensis. This implies that either two new monophyletic subgenera need to be erected, or Olenellus (Paedeumias) and Olenellus (Olenellus) need to be dropped as subgenera, the latter being proposed by Lieberman.

=== Reassigned species ===
- O. alabamensis = Fremontella halli
- O. altifrontatus = Bolbolenellus altifrontatus
- O. argentus pl. 40, fig 12, 13, 15, 16, non fig. 14 = Grandinasus argentus
- O. argentus pl. 40, fig 14, non fig. 12, 13, 15, 16 = Holmiella falx
- O. bondoni = Fallotaspis bondoni
- O. bonnensis = Mesonacis bonnensis
- O. brevoculus = Mesonacis bonnensis
- O. broegeri = Callavia broegeri
- O. bristolensis = Bristolia bristolensis
- O. bristolensis p. 8. fig 1-11, non pl. 7, fig 1, 2, 5 = Bristolia harringtoni
- O. bufrontis = Bolbolenellus sphaerulosus
- O. callavei = Callavonia callavei
- O. cylindricus = Mesonacis cylindricus
- O. eagerensis = Mesonacis eagerensis
- O. euryparia = Bolbolenellus euryparia
- O. forresti = Redlichia forresti
- O. fremonti pl. 15, fig. 18 = Bristolia fragilis
- O. fremonti pl. 37, fig. 1, 4-5 = Bolbolenellus euryparia
- O. fremonti pl. 37, fig. 1-2 = Mesonacis fremonti
- O. georgiensis, p. 220, pl. 5, fig. 7, non fig. 6 = Mesonacis vermontanus
- O. gigas = Andalusiana cornuta
- O. gilberti = Bristolia bristolensis
- O. groenlandicus = Bolbolenellus groenlandicus
- O. halli = Fremontella halli
- O. hamoculus = Mesonacis hamoculus
- O. hermani = Bolbolenellus hermani
- O. hyperboreus = Mesolenellus hyperboreus
- O. insolens = Bristolia insolens
- O. intermedius = Fritzolenellus lapworthi or F. reticulatus
- O. kentensis = Bolbolenellus groenlandicus
- O. lapworthi = Fritzolenellus lapworthi
- O. laxocules = Elliptocephala laxocules
- O. logani = Elliptocephala logani
- O. mickwitzi = Schmidtiellus mickwitzi mickwitzi
- O. mohavensis = Bristolia mohavensis
- O. multinodus = Nephrolenellus multinodus
- O. paraocules = Elliptocephala paraocules
- O. praenuntius = Elliptocephala praenuntius
- O. reticulatus = Fritzolenellus reticulatus
- O. sequomalus = Elliptocephala sequomalus
- O. sphaerulosus = Bolbolenellus sphaerulosus
- O. svalbardensis = Mesolenellus svalbardensis
- O. terranovicus = Mesonacis bonnensis
- O. torelli = Schmidtiellus mickwitzi torelli
- O. truemani = Elliptocephala walcotti
- O. truemani = Fritzolenellus truemani
- O. truncatooculatus = Mummaspis truncatooculatus
- O. vermontanus = Mesonacis vermontanus
- O. walcottanus = Wanneria walcottana

== Distribution ==
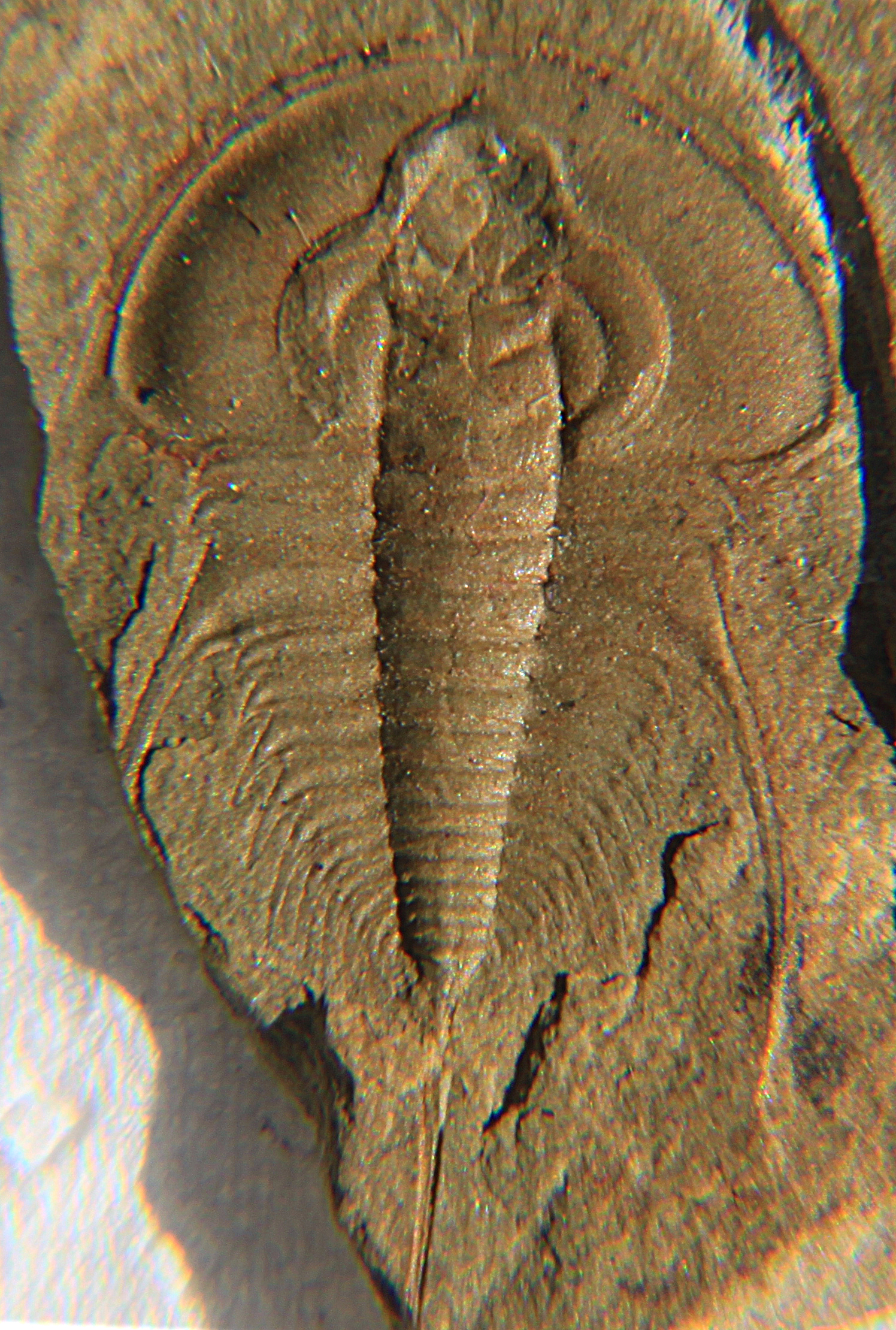
Olenellus gilberti

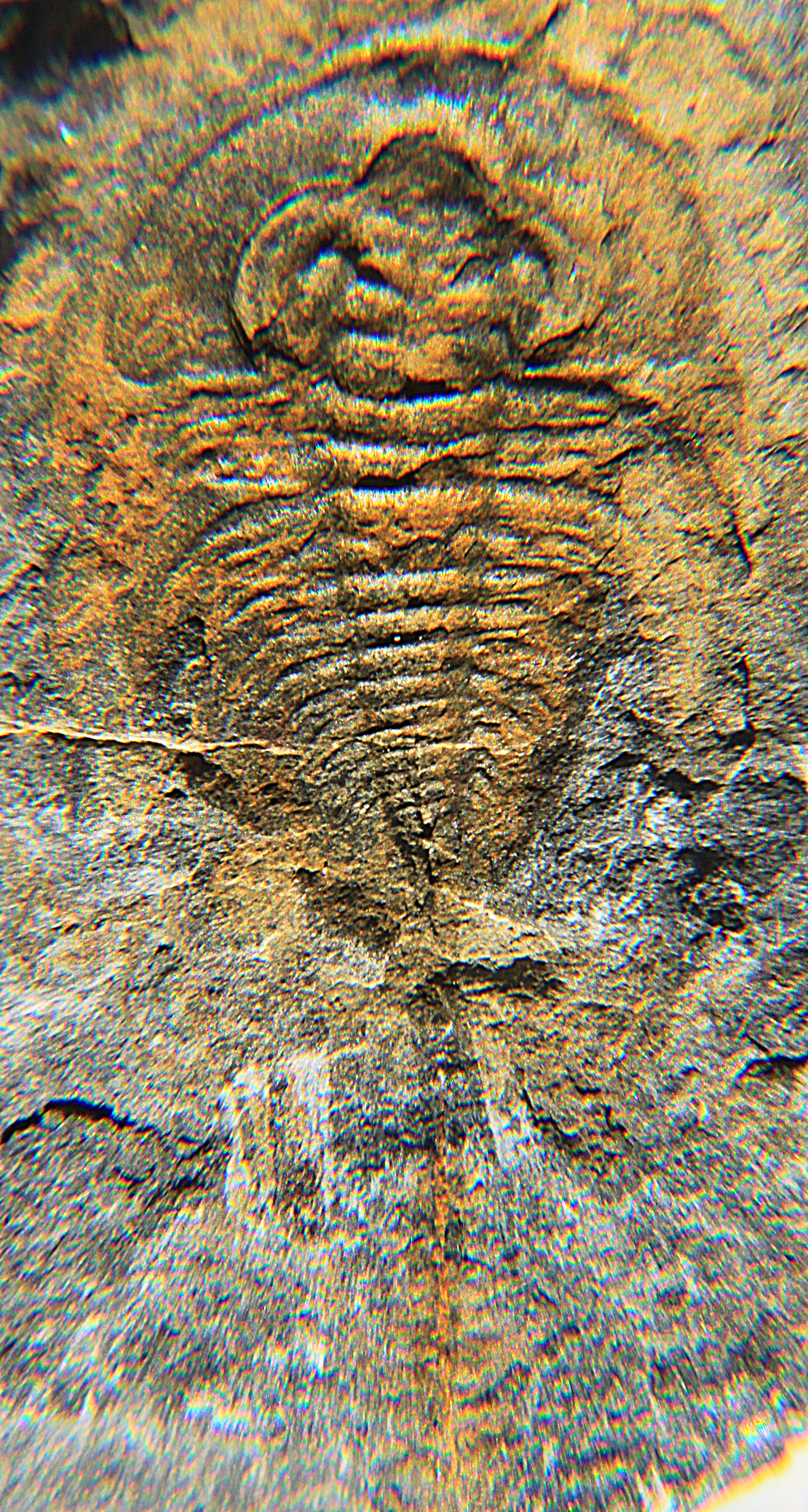
Olenellus roddyi

O. thompsoni is found in the middle Upper Olenellus-zone of Vermont (Franklin County, Parker Slate, Georgia).

O. agellus is present in the middle Upper Olenellus-zone of Vermont (Parker Slate, Georgia).

O. chiefensis has been collected from the final layer of the Upper Olenellus-zone of Nevada (Pioche Formation).

O. clarki is found in Upper Olenellus-zone of California (Bristol Mountain, near Cadiz, on the Santa Fé Railroad, 100 miles (160 km) east of Barstow, Mohave Desert, probably Latham Shale; Latham Shale – treated as the Bristolia-zonule – Marble Mountains, 1/2 mile (0.80 km) east of Cadiz, and at the southern end of the Marble Mountains, near Chambless in the Mohave Desert portion of San Bernardino County, as well as from the Latham Shale, near Summit Springs on the west side of the Providence Mountains, San Bernardino County. In California also from the Carrara Formation, Funeral Mountains, Resting Spring Range, Eagle mountain, Grapevine Mountains, Salt Spring Hills); and in Nevada (Nevada Test Site, Desert Range).

O. crassimarginatus has been collected in the middle Upper Olenellus-zone of Vermont (Parkers Quarry, Parker Slate, Georgia); and 1/2 mile (0.80 km) south of East Petersburg; 2 miles (3.2 km) north of York and Fruitville, 3 miles (4.8 km) north of Lancaster (all in the Kinzers Shale).

O. fowleri has been collected from the final layer of the Upper Olenellus-zone of Nevada (Pioche Formation).

O. getzi is found in Upper Olenellus-zone of Pennsylvania (2 miles (3.2 km) north of York, and Noah Getz Farm, 1 mile north of Rohrerstown, Kinzers Shale).

O. howelli occurs in the final layer of the Upper Olenellus-zone of Nevada (Pioche Formation).

O. nevadensis has been collected in the Upper Olenellus-zone, Bristolia-zonule of California (Carrara Formation, Funeral Mountains and Grapevine Mountains); and from the Latham Shale – treated as the Bristolia-zonule – at the south end of the Marble Mountains, near Chambless in the Mohave Desert portion of San Bernardino County. It also occurs in the Bristolia-zonule, Upper Olenellus-zone of Nevada (Carrara Formation, Desert Range, Locality M-5).

O. parvifrontatus has been collected in the Olenellus-zone of the Yukon Territory, Canada (Unit 6 of the Upper Illtyd Formation, Wernecke Mountains).

O. puertoblancoensis was found in the Botonian/Toyonian Olenellus-zone of the Caborca Region, Mexico (Buelna Formation, Cerro Rajon)

O. robsonensis occurs in the ?Middle Olenellus-zone of British Columbia, Canada (?Upper Mahto Formation, drift block on the slope of the Mural Glacier below Mumm Peak, Near Mount Robson).

O. roddyi occurs in the Olenellus-zone of Pennsylvania (2 miles (3.2 km) north of York, Fruitville; 3 miles (4.8 km) north of Lancaster; Getz Quarry; 1 mile north of Rohrerstown; 1/2 mile (0.80 km) south of East Petersburg; all in the Kinzers Shale).

O. romensis occurs in the middle Upper Olenellus-zone of Virginia (Rome Formation, Mason Creek, Salem; northeast of Roanoke, near Webster; 2 miles (3.2 km) southwest of Blue Ridge Springs, 2 miles (3.2 km) south of Max Meadows; Mason Creek, 1 mile (1.6 km) east of Salem; 1/2 mile (0.80 km) southeast of Indian Rock; 1 mile (1.6 km) east of Cleveland, Alabama; 1 1/2 miles (2.4 km) north of Montevallo; 1 1/2 miles (2.4 km) west of Montevallo).

O. terminatus has been collected from the final layer of the Upper Olenellus-zone of Nevada (Pioche Formation).

O. transitans has been collected from the middle Upper Olenellus-zone of Vermont (Parker Slate, Georgia).

== Description ==
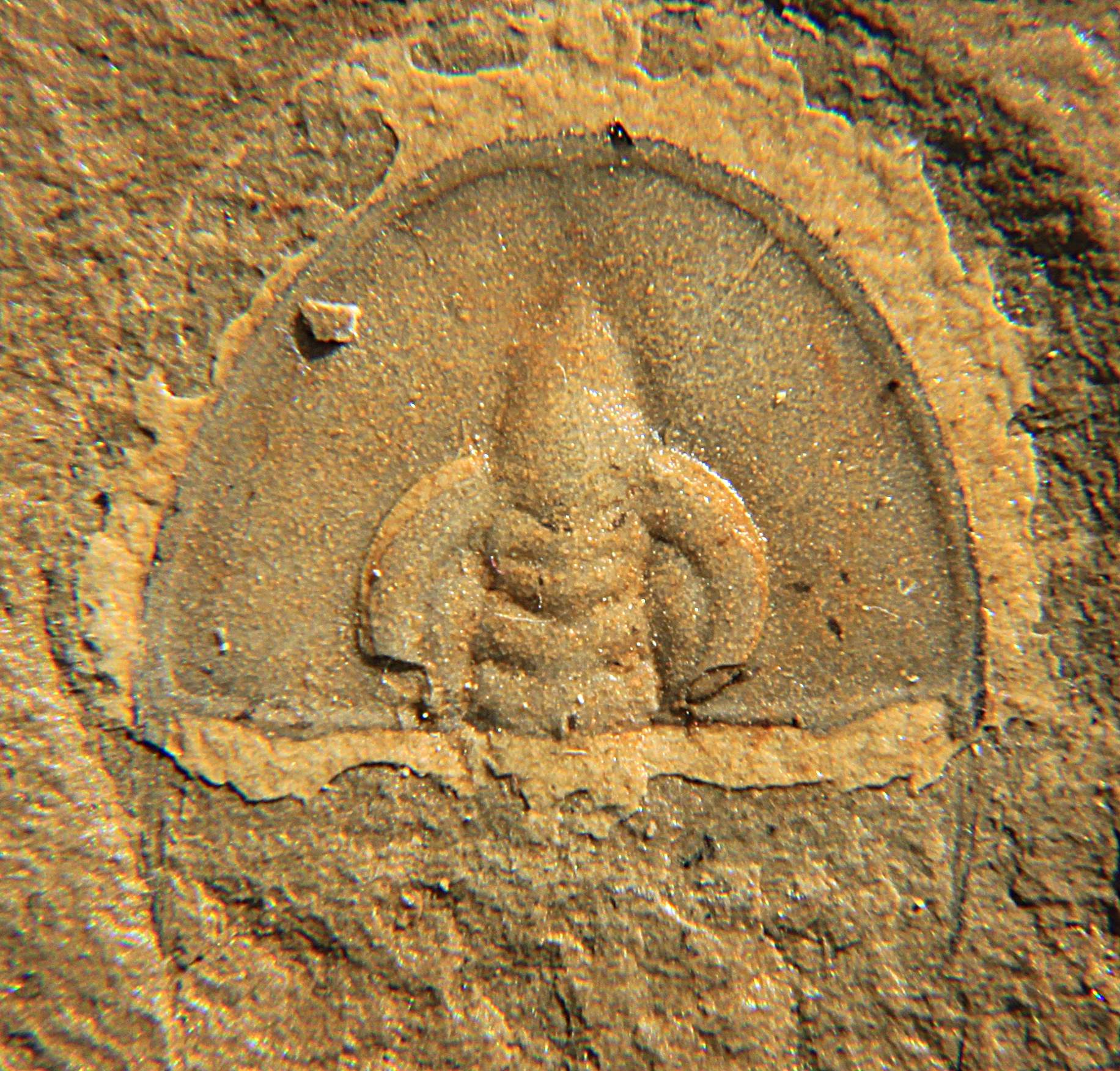
Olenellus chiefensis-cephalon

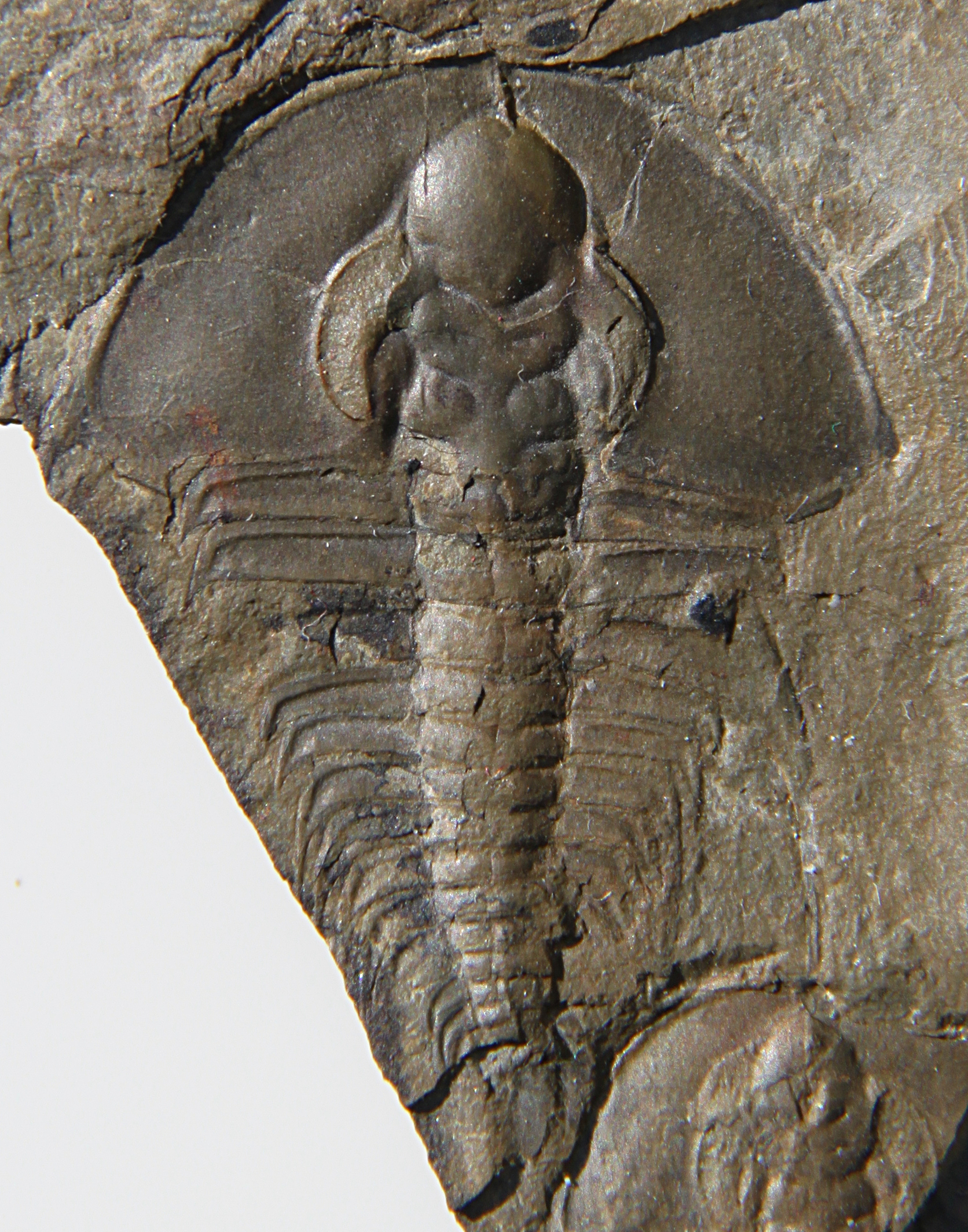
Olenellus clarki

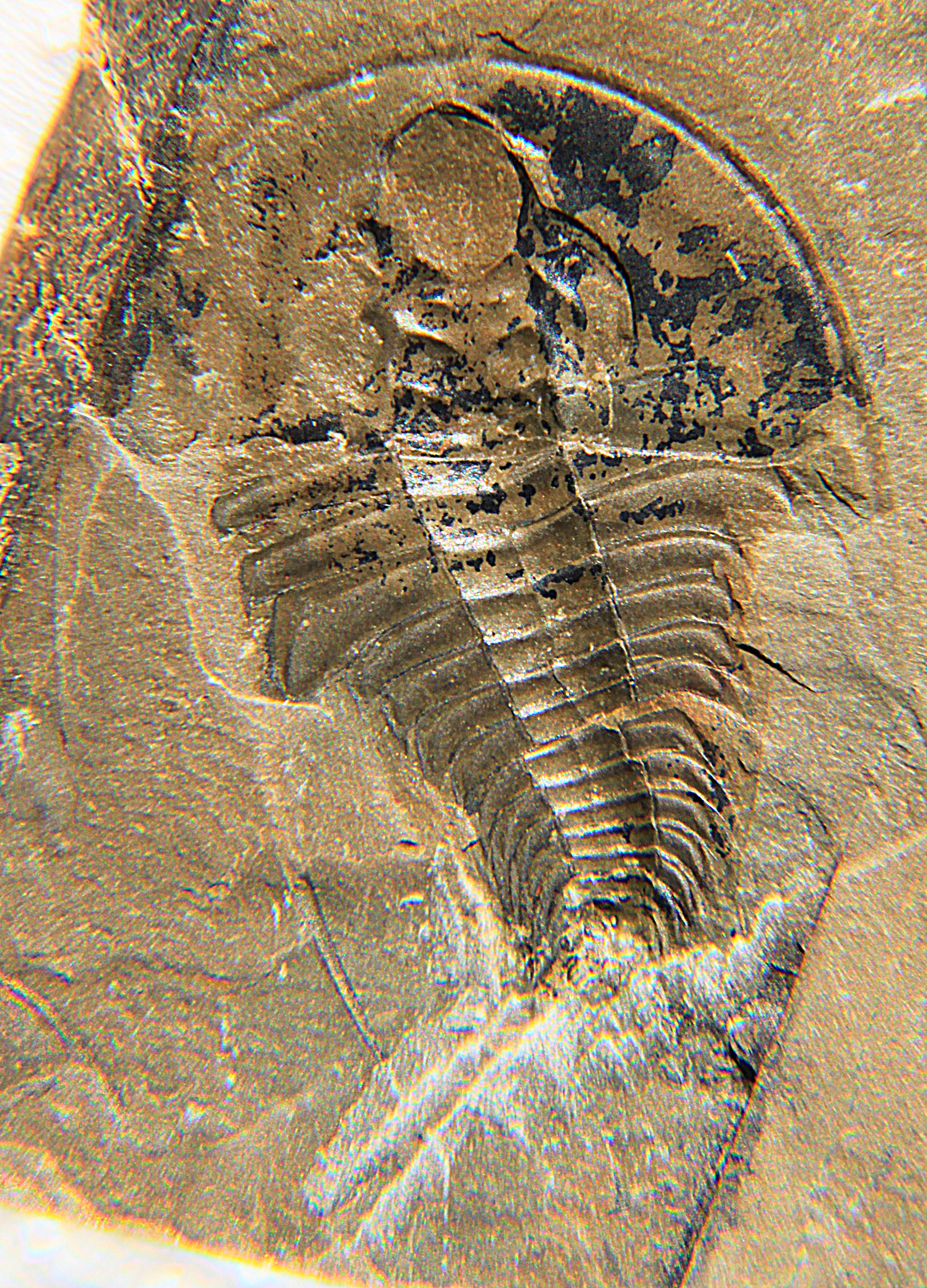
Olenellus nevadensis

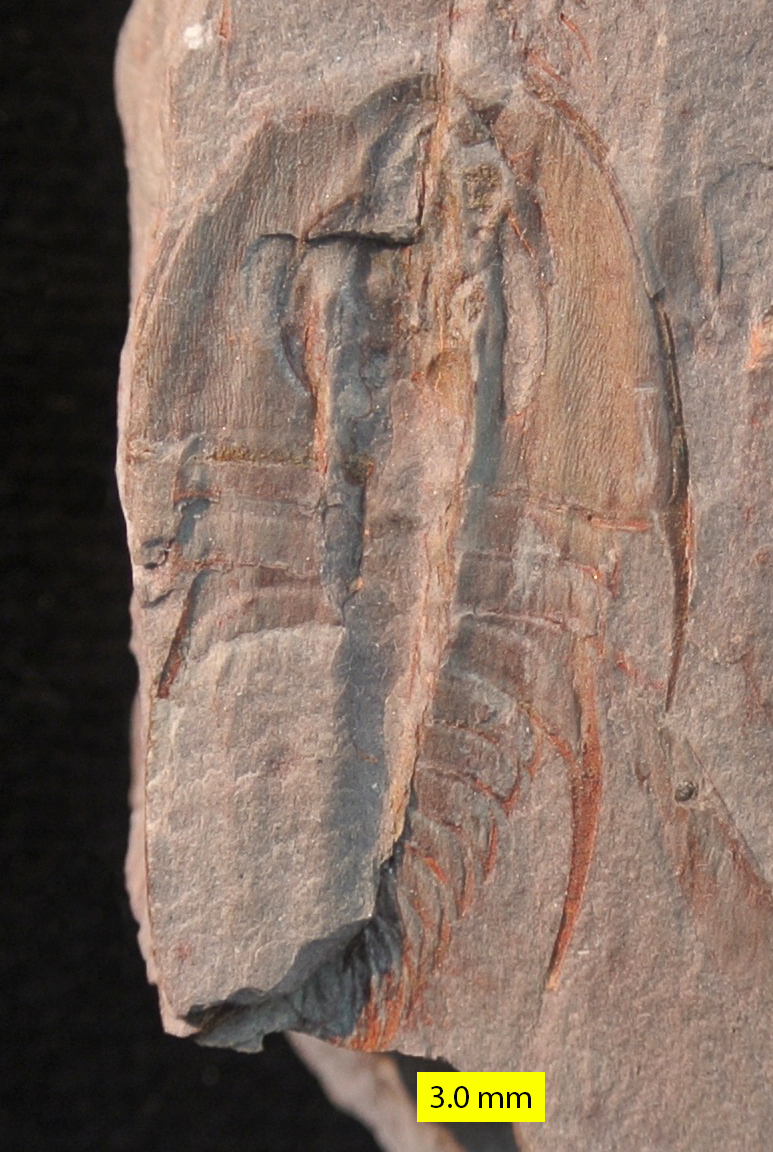
Olenellus terminatus

As with most early trilobites, Olenellus has an almost flat exoskeleton, that is only thinly calcified, and has crescent-shaped eye ridges. As part of the suborder Olenellina, Olenellus lacks dorsal sutures. Like all other members of the superfamily Olenelloide, the eye-ridges emerge from the back of the frontal lobe (L4) of the central area of the cephalon, that is called glabella. Olenellus also shares the typical character of whole family Olenellidae that the frontal (L3) and middle pair (L2) of lateral lobes of the glabella are partially merged. This creates two very typical, isolated slits. It can be distinguished from the other two genera in the family, Mesolenellus and Mesonacis, because the angle in the back rim of the cephalon is less than 15°, making the head approximately semi-circular. The genal spines are reaching back no further than the 6th thorax segment, making them 4-5 times as long as the most backward lobe of the glabella (occipital ring or L0)1. The thorax is 4-4 1/2 times wider that the axis, measured at the 3rd segment. The base of the spine on the 15th thorax segment is almost as wide as the axis itself.

== Key to the species ==
This key is based on Lieberman (1999), which describes only part of the species that are recognized today.

1	Frontal lobe of the glabella (L4) rounded. → 2
-	L4 pointed anteriorly. → Olenellus chiefensis
2	The frontal lobe of the glabella (L4) is connected with the border surrounding the cephalon with a short ridge on the midline (the so-called “plectrum”). → 3
-	Plectrum absent. → 8
3	Frontal lobe of the glabella (L4) as wide as, or narrower than, the occipital ring (L0). → 4
-	L4 wider than L0. → Olenellus agellus
4	Ocular lobe with a prominent furrow along the entire margin. → 5
-	Furrow only present at the anterior margin of the ocular lobe. → 7
5	The area outside the eye lobe (or extraocular area) is prominently flattened. The frontal margin of the third thorax segment (T3) is deflected anteriorly between 0% and 10%. The eye lobe extends backward to the middle of the occipital ring (L0) or the furrow (S0) between the occipital ring (L0) and the most backward pair of side lobes (L1). → 6
-	The area outside the eye lobe (or extraocular area) is gently convex. The frontal margin of T3 is deflected anteriorly between 5% and 10%. The eye lobe extends backward to the middle of L0. → Olenellus roddyi
6	The maximum width of the frontal lobe of the glabella (L4) is more than 80% of the maximum width of the backward most lobe (L0). The area in front of the glabella (or preglabellar field) is between 15% and 25% of the length of L4. The right and left furrow (S2) between the second (L2) and third (L3) pair of side lobes (counted from the back of the cephalon) may or may not join across the midline. The eye lobe extends backward to the furrow (S0) between L0 and the most backward pair of side lobes (L1). → Olenellus clarki
-	The maximum width of L4 is less than 80% of the maximum width of L0. The area in front of the glabella (or preglabellar field) is between 15% and 50% of the length of L4. The right and left S2-furrow join across the midline. The eye lobe extends backward to the middle of L0 or S0. → Olenellus nevadensis
7	The right and left furrow (S1) between the first (L1) and second (L2) pair of side lobes (counted from the back of the cephalon) join across the midline. The area outside the eye lobe (or extraocular area) is prominently flattened. The frontal margin of the third thorax segment (T3) is deflected anteriorly between 5% and 10%. → Olenellus transitans
-	The right and left part of S1 do not join across the midline. The area outside the eye lobe (or extraocular area) is gently convex. The frontal margin of T3 is deflected anteriorly between 0% and 5%. → Olenellus parvofrontatus
8	The eye lobe extends backward to the furrow (S0) between the occipital ring (L0) and the most backward pair of side lobes (L1). → 9
-	The eye lobe extends backward to the middle of L0. → 10
9	The maximum width of the frontal lobe of the glabella (L4) is larger than the maximum width of the occipital ring (L0). L2 bulges laterally compared to L0. The pleural spines of the third thorax segment (T3) extend backwards the entire length of the prothorax. The width of the seventh thorax segment (T7) is more than two-thirds of the width of T3, excluding the spines. → Olenellus romensis
-	The maximum width of L4 is smaller than, or approximately equal to, the maximum width of L0. L2 is as wide as L0. The pleural spines of T3 extend backwards 6 to 8 segments. The width of T7 is less than two-thirds of the width of T3, excluding the spines. → Olenellus getzi
10	The maximum width of the frontal lobe of the glabella (L4) is larger than the maximum width of the occipital ring (L0). L2 bulges laterally compared to L0. → Olenellus thompsoni
-	The maximum width of L4 is approximately equal to the maximum width of L0. L2 bulges laterally compared to L0. → Olenellus robsonensis
-	The maximum width of L4 is smaller than the maximum width of L0. L2 is as wide as L0. → Olenellus crassimarginatus
