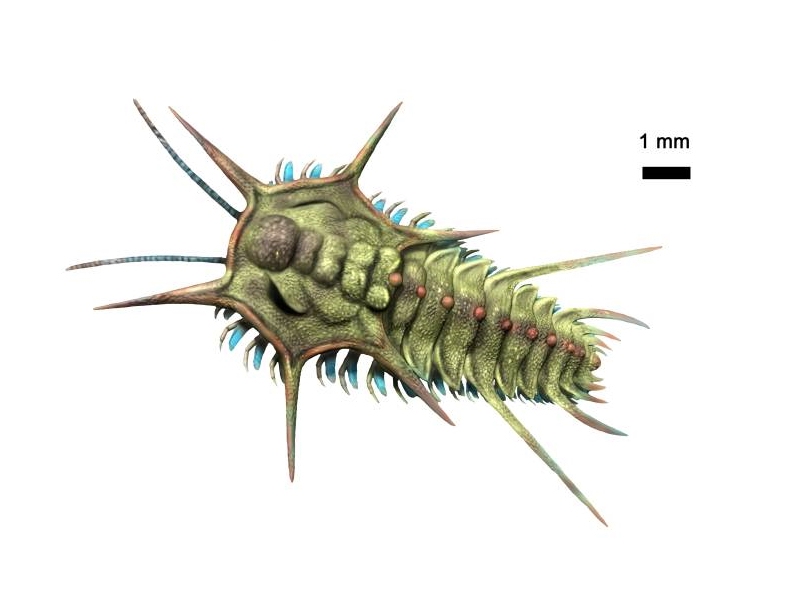
- Artist's reconstruction

Scientific classification
- Kingdom: Animalia
- Phylum: Arthropoda
- Clade: †Artiopoda
- Class: †Trilobita
- Order: †Redlichiida
- Family: †Biceratopsidae
- Genus: †Olenelloides
- Species: †O. armatus

Binomial name
- †Olenelloides armatus (Peach, 1894)

Synonyms
- Olenellus (Olenelloides) armatus Peach, 1894

= Olenelloides =

Olenelloides Temporal range: Late Botomian 519–516 Ma

Species of trilobite, an extinct arthropod

Olenelloides armatus is an extinct, small sized (about 1 centimetre or 0.39 inches long) olenelloid redlichiid trilobite arthropod. It lived during the later part of the Botomian stage, which lasted from approximately 524 to 518.5 million years ago. This faunal stage was part of the Cambrian Period. Its most conspicuous feature is the hexagonal head shield that carries 6 ray-like spines.

== Etymology ==
The genus is named after its originally supposed close relationship with Olenellus. The species epithet armatus, a Latin adjective meaning 'armoured', is a reference to the fierce looking spines of the head shield.

== Occurrence ==
Olenelloides armatus lived during the late Lower Cambrian deposits presumably contemporary with the middle Olenellus-zone (Wanneria subzone), that probably represents the late Botomian, approximately between 519 and 516 million years ago.

== Distribution ==
Olenelloides armatus has been collected from the Fucoid Beds, Northern slopes of the Meall a'Ghiubhais, County Ross and Cromarty, Scotland, UK.

== Description ==
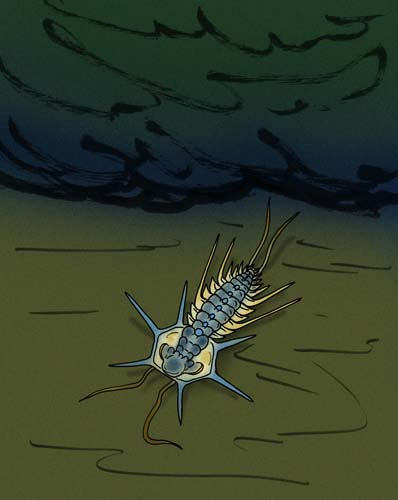
Restoration of O. armatus

As with most early trilobites, Olenelloides has an almost flat exoskeleton, that is only thinly calcified, and has crescent-shaped eye ridges. As part of the Olenellina suborder, Olenelloides lacks dorsal sutures. Like all other members of the Olenelloidea superfamily, the eye-ridges spring from the back of the frontal lobe (L4) of the central area of the cephalon, that is called glabella.

The exoskeleton of Olenelloides armatus is small (up to 1 cm (0.39 in)) and narrow (less than 1/2 as wide as long, measured between the base of the outermost spines).

Its head shield (or cephalon) is hexagonal, with three pairs of spines extending from each of the corners of the cephalon, all almost 2/3 as long as the diameter of the cephalon. The frontal pair (or procranidial spines) have an angle of about 25° to the axis, the middle pair (or genal spines) of about 100°, and the rear pair (or intergenal spines) of about 150°. The intergenal spines do not emerge from the cephalic border, but rather from the sides of the 2nd lobe of the glabella from the back - the scientific convention is to count glabellar lobes back to front, giving them the following names: occipital ring or lobe (OR or OL), 1st lobe (L1), 2nd lobe (L2), 3rd lobe (L3), and anterior lobe (AL or L4) -. The front side of the cephalon is slightly bulging out forward to accommodate the frontal lobe (L4) of the raised central area called glabella. The eye lobes are short, wide and strongly curved, occupying most of the middle 1/3rd of the area outside the glabella (the 'cheeks' or genae). The occipital ring is wider than the other glabellar lobes, and carries a node on the rear edge at midline.

The thorax has a wide axis of about 2/5 of the total width of the thorax, not including the spines, and consists of 9 segments. The frontal 3 are equal in size, but segments further back get smaller at an increasing rate. The thorax segments carry a node on the rear edge at midline, that diminishes towards the back. The 1st, 2nd, 4th and 5th thorax segments (counting front to back) do not carry spines, the frontal edge of the outer lobes (or pleurae) suddenly angles back at 150° ending in a blunt tip. The 3rd segment ends laterally in a straight spine that angles back at about 150° and extending backwards beyond the axis. The 6th-10th segments carry spines that curve backwards and increasingly inwards to the midline and extending increasingly less far backwards, the 6th ending parallel to the midline and extending as far back as the spine of the 3rd segment.

== Taxonomic history ==
Ben Peach described the species as Olenellus (Olenelloides) armatus, assigning it to a new subgenus of Olenellus. Other early scholars regarded Olenelloides armatus as a separate genus closely related to Olenellus. McNamara argued that O. armatus developed from Olenellus ancestry through retention of juvenile features (paedomorphosis), and regarded the original ranking more appropriate. More recent scholars however suggest to treat Olenelloides as a peculiar but valid genus within the Olenellidae, and assign it provisionally to the subfamily Laudoniinae. They argue that the absence of a preglabellar field and the presence of advanced genal spines are not immature features, but are shared with Laudonia. Lieberman does not support assignment to the Laudoniinae, and alternatively proposes inclusion in the Biceratopsinae.

== Habitat ==
Olenelloides armatus probably was a fast-moving low-level epifaunal detritivore.
