= Alum Shale Formation =

Geologic formation in Scandinavia

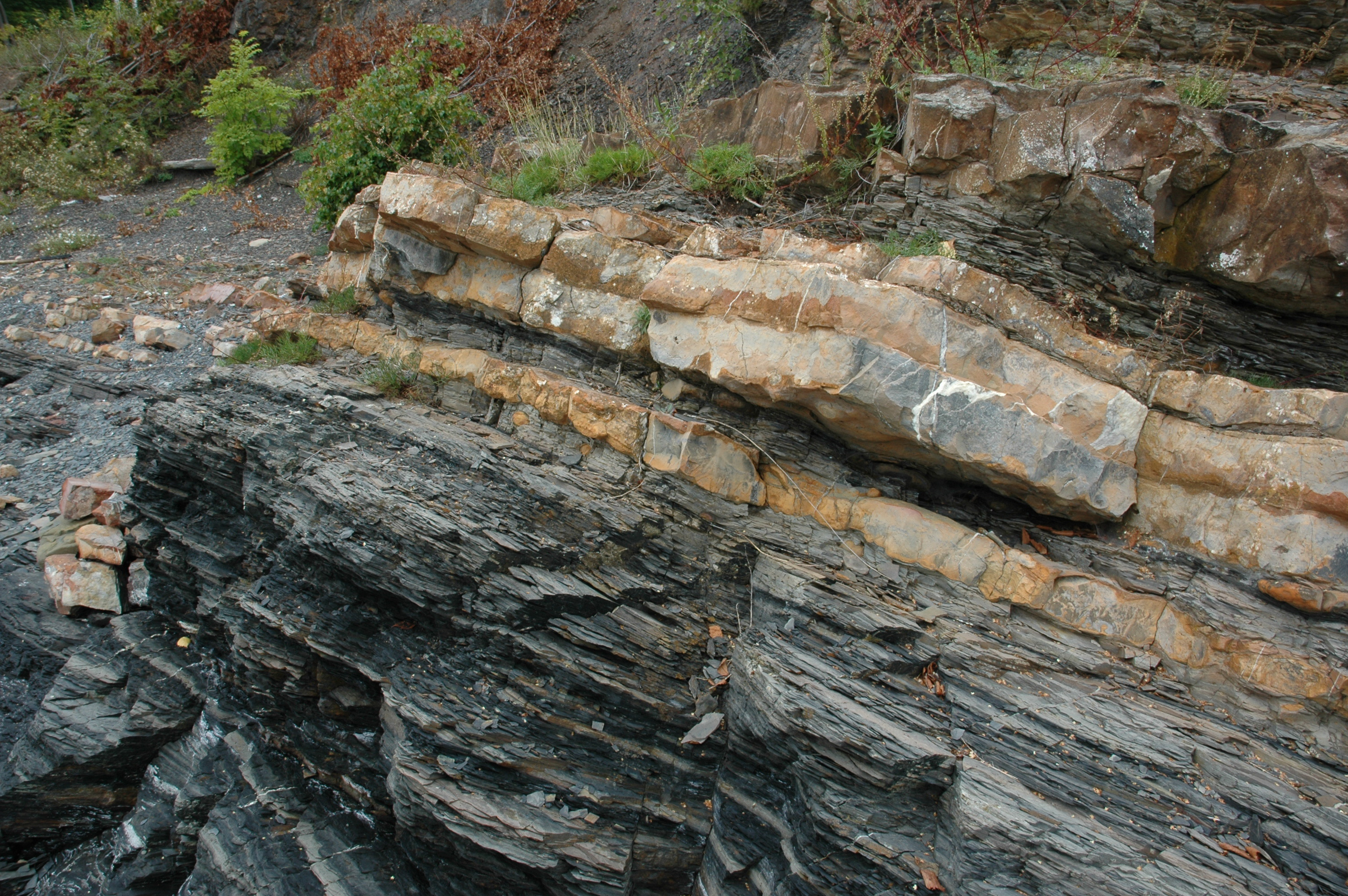
Black Alum shales intercalated with wellowish to brownish limestone beds. Oslo field

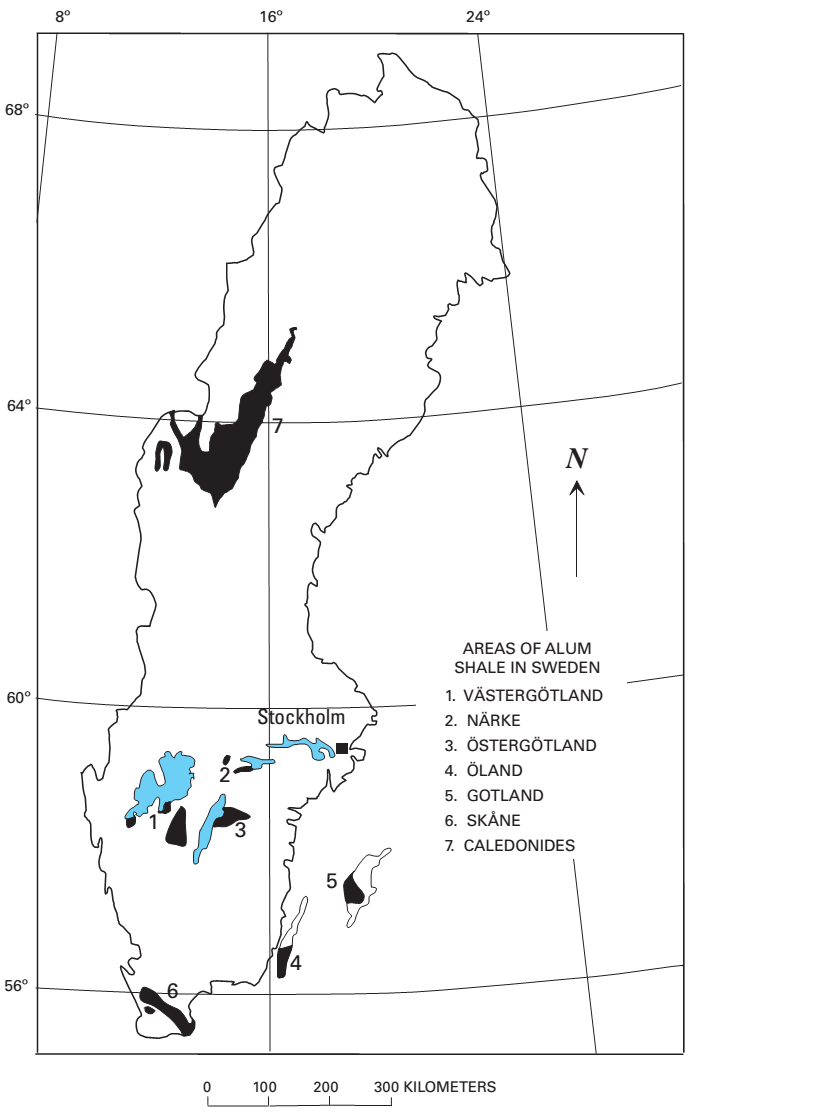
Distribution of Alum Shale in Sweden

The Alum Shale Formation is a rock formation of black shale of Miaolingian (Middle Cambrian) to Tremadocian (Lower Ordovician) in age found predominantly in Scandinavia, but also some parts of Estonia and Finland. The greatest extent of the rock deposition comprises most of Sweden. It is characterized by organic-rich shales.

The name derives from the ancient mining of the rock to obtain alum. There’s economic interest surrounding these rocks, due to unusually high concentrations of U, V, Mo, P, REE, among others, now considered critical materials for future sustainable development.

== Lithology ==
The Alum Shale comprises several facies like greywacke, shale, sandstones, and arkose, with varying degrees of organic matter content up to 20%. Clays, quartz, feldspars are the abundant minerals. Clay minerals are dominated by illite, with some smectite, kaolinite, and chlorite. Pyrite is common and calcite veins are usually present.

The basement is represented by the Paleoproterozoic basement of the Baltoscandian Platform. It is unconformably overlain by Early Cambrian quartz sandstones, which are intercalated with siltstone and shale towards the Caledonies; the upper parts are usually glauconitic and phosphatic, and then is overlain by Middle Cambrian greenish gray siltstones. This transitions to a thin conglomerate, and afterwards the Alum Shale rocks. Above these black shales, glauconitic, phosphatic, and sandy limestones are found. Subsequently, Ordovician limestones and shales sequences were deposited until the Silurian.

== Geological history ==
Location of the Caledonian/Acadian mountain chains in the Early Devonian Epoch. Present day coastlines are shown for reference.

During the Early Cambrian, sedimentation occurred in a shallow-water epicontinental environment, after rising sea-levels allowed the flooding of Baltica, followed by a series of transgressive and regressive events, finishing with a major regression in the Lower Cambrian. During Middle Cambrian, particular conditions such as slow deposition and anoxic environment favored the deposition of the Alum Shale.

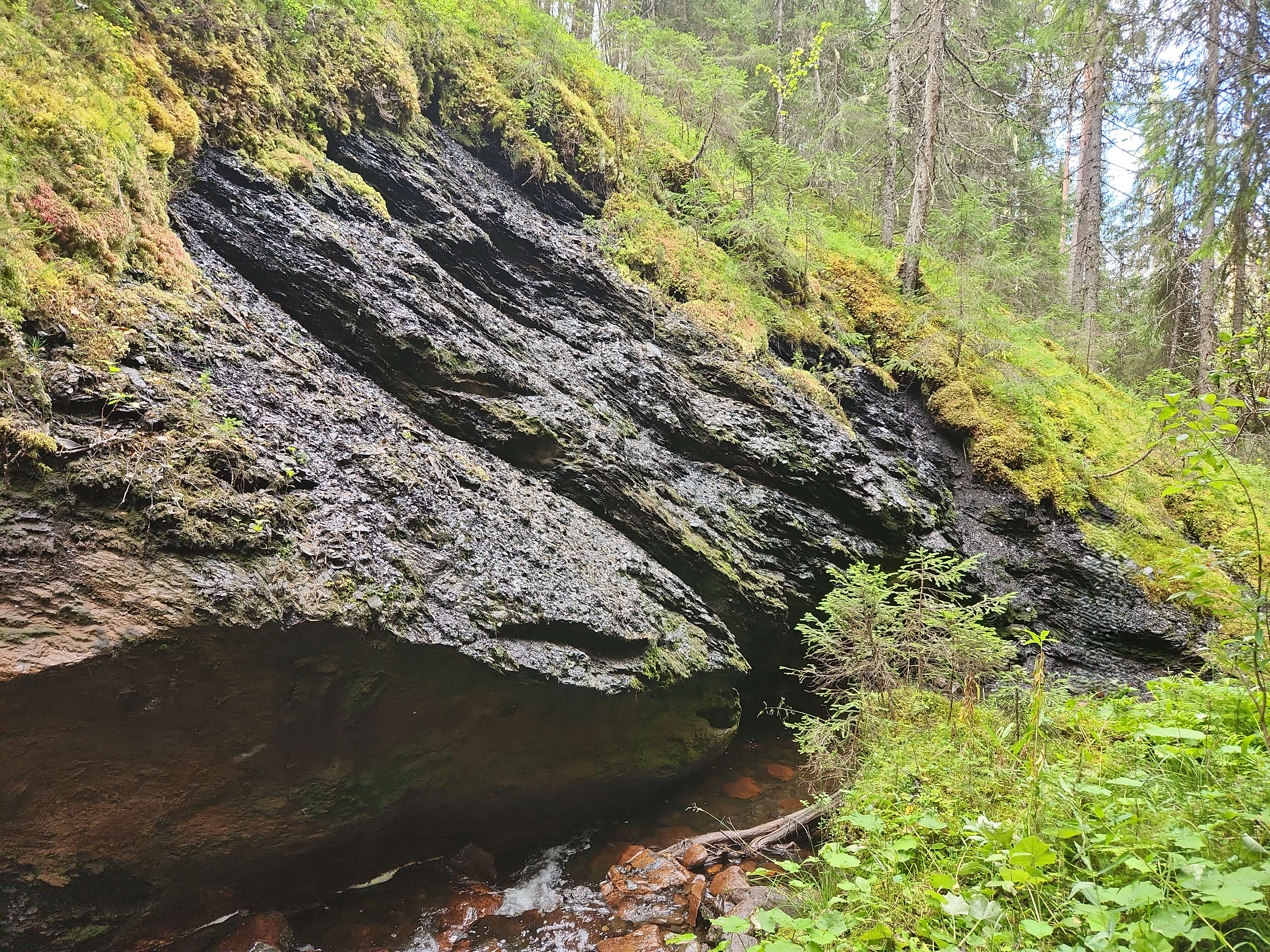
Slightly metamorphosed beds of Alum Shale, northern Jämtland.

During the Caledonian orogeny, the Alum Shales layers served as a detachment surface for the allochthonous thrust series. This favored the repetition of Alum Shale beds, increasing its thickness.

== Fossil content ==
8502 specimens of trilobite-agnostoid fauna were found in the Furongian strata of this formation in Bornholm, Denmark. Most of them are disarticulated sclerites. Described gerena include Ctenopyge, Eurycare, Leptoplastus, Olenus, Parabolina, Peltura, Protopeltura, Sphaerophthalmus, Lotagnostus and Triangulopyge.

Orsten fauna are characteristic of the Orsten lagerstätte, in the Alum Shale Formation at Sweden.

== Mining history ==
The name “Alum” comes from the ancient mining of alum salt over 350 years ago, which led to the development of a major industry. The mining started in 1637 at Andrarum, in Skåne. The salts were used for several purposes, such as skin preparation, textile coloring, and as astringent in pharmaceutics.

The kerogen hosted in the rock was exploited, yielding significant oil quantities, although this was limited to areas in Västergötland, Närke, and Östergötland. The production of petroleum was expanded in 1942 during the II World War as a military asset, and finalized in 1966 due to being not economically feasible anymore. It was also mined for uranium as it has anomalously high concentrations of this element, prominently in the Ranstad mill, with Atomenergi AB designing extraction methods which reached up to 80% of uranium recovery. Attempts to extract vanadium during the 1940s were performed.
