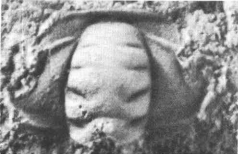
- Stereogram of holotype cranidium of Aciculolenus peculiaris, taken by Allison R. Palmer

Scientific classification
- Kingdom: Animalia
- Phylum: Arthropoda
- Clade: †Artiopoda
- Class: †Trilobita
- Order: †Ptychopariida
- Family: †Olenidae
- Subfamily: †Oleninae
- Genus: †Aciculolenus; Palmer, 1965

Type species
- †Aciculolenus peculiaris Palmer, 1965

Other species
- † A. askewi Chatterton, 2020; † A. palmeri Chatterton & Ludvigsen, 1998

= Aciculolenus =

Aciculolenus Temporal range: Furongian

Genus of trilobites

Aciculolenus is a genus of trilobites that lived during the Furongian epoch of the Cambrian in what is now North America. First described in 1965 by paleontologist Allison R. Palmer with the species Aciculolenus peculiaris, whose remains were discovered in Nevada, United States, other researchers have since found and described additional species in British Columbia, Canada: A. palmeri and A. askewi. Specimens are small, with the largest reaching 9–18 millimeters (0.35–0.71 in) depending on species. Their bodily segments are narrow, with some ending in long, spiny tips. The possibility that their size and other anatomical features can be explained by paedomorphosis (slower development compared to relatives) has been considered. Their habitats included calm, deep sea floors where they would have coexisted with other trilobites and a few other animals. Living in the benthos, it is possible that they maintained a symbiotic relationship with chemoautotrophs in their environment.

== History of discovery ==
Aciculolenus was described by American paleontologist Allison R. Palmer in 1965 in a study of trilobites of the Great Basin region of the United States. The study was part of a larger effort to study the Cambrian-aged Pterocephaliid biomere: a biomere being an assemblage of fossils with similar characteristics that has a well-defined start- and endpoint; the Pterocephaliid biomere is dominated by trilobites of the families Pterocephaliidae and Elviniidae. The biomere is divided into five zones, punctuated by sudden faunal turnover coinciding with the beginning of the first zone and the end of the last zone. Palmer wrote that the lower boundary was "certainly" time transgressive (varying in age) and that the upper one possibly was. He believed that the sudden changes that led to the start and end of the Pterocephaliid biomere represented the colonization of the Great Basin region by new groups and the extinction of earlier forms. Palmer wrote that Aciculolenus was found rarely near the end of the final zone, recording specimens from Cherry Creek and Ruby Range, Nevada. He assigned all specimens to the type species, Aciculolenus peculiaris. The word peculiaris is Latin for 'peculiar' or 'special'.

In 1998, paleontologists Brian D. E. Chatterton and Rolf Ludvigsen described an additional species, A. palmeri, from the McKay Group of southeastern British Columbia, Canada. The species was named in honor of Palmer, who the authors described as an eminent researcher of Cambrian trilobites. The specimens found included multiple molts and complete carcasses. In 2020, Chatterton described another species, A. askewi, also from the McKay Group, previously identified by Chatterton and Stacey Gibb in 2016 on the basis of some poorly preserved remains ("Aciculolenus new species A"). It was named after Don Askew, a collector and preparator of trilobites. The remains found included complete and incomplete carcasses and molts, with some indeterminate between the two. Chatterton acknowledged that the collections of fossils used in his study, largely assembled by amateurs, may have suffered from bias towards rarer and more attractive specimens, specifically identifying A. askewi as one of the more attractive species.

== Description ==
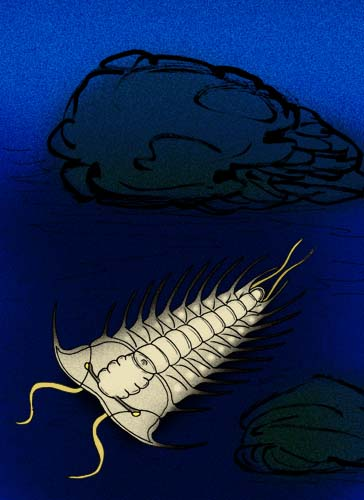
Life reconstruction of Aciculolenus palmeri

Palmer wrote that the only part of Aciculolenus he had collected was the cranidium (part of the head of trilobites). The glabella (central part of the head) is convex and tapered forward. The fixed cheeks (facial structures connected to the glabella) are somewhat narrow, while the palpebral lobes (lobes overlaying the eyes) are short and prominent. They are connected to eye ridges, also described as prominent. Along its axis is a structure that Palmer interpreted as either a node or the base of a spine.

The discovery of A. palmeri revealed additional features of the genus not previously described, including the small size of the largest mature specimens, no more than 9 millimeters (0.35 in); a pronounced, barrel-shaped glabella; narrow pleurae (segments), small in size for its family; and the presence of long, spiny tips on the thoracic segments, which remain similar in length from the front of the thorax to the back. Chatterton and Ludvigsen wrote that although direct comparison to A. peculiaris was difficult, they felt that it fell outside the range of variation of specimens of A. palmeri. The specimens were also noted for their long, prominent genal and intergenal spines (two separate sets of spines along the edge of the trilobite head); distinct eye ridges that run forward and inward toward the frontal lobe of the glabella; and small eyes. While intergenal spines and spinose thoracic tips are present in related trilobites, they are not otherwise known to occur together (perhaps due to incomplete specimens). The presence and morphology of the two sets of cephalic spines (identified by Chatterton and Ludvigsen as general and intergenal) have led to some debate regarding their nature, along with that of the facial suture (an anatomical feature of trilobites that aided in molting).

Chatterton commented on the lack of preserved distinguishing features of A. peculiaris once more while describing A. askewi, suggesting the shape of the glabella and positioning of the eyes as potential differences. He wrote that the cranidium of A. peculiaris appeared more similar to that of A. askewi than to that of A. palmeri, and that while the former two species appeared evidently closely related, he found it unlikely that they were conspecific. The carapaces observed were reported as large, long, and narrow for Aciculolenus, with the largest individuals reaching 18 millimeters (0.71 in). Specimens showing varying positioning of the hypostome (hard mouthpart of trilobites) relative to the free cheeks (structures adjacent to the fixed cheeks), suggesting that decomposition may have played a role in dislocating the hypostome (which was perhaps held in place by an organic membrane in life).

== Classification ==
Palmer tentatively assigned Aciculolenus to the family Olenidae, writing that the number of "peculiar" features it had made it difficult to compare with other trilobites. This classification was supported by Chatterton and Ludvigsen in 1998 and by Chatterton in 2020. Neither study assigned a subfamily. In a 2025 assessment of the family Olenidae by the paleontologist Daniela Soledad Monti, Aciculolenus was placed in the subfamily Oleninae.

== Paleobiology ==
The small size of the specimens they collected, as well as their spines and physical similarity to Olenelloides armatus, led Chatterton and Ludvigsen to consider the possibility of Aciculolenus being paedomorphic (developmentally slowed compared to relatives). Other proposed similarities include the eye placement and the low number of thoracic segments: nine (A. askewi, described later, has thirteen), significantly below the mean for its family. However, the authors wrote that its small pygidium (rear portion) with only one segment does not align with what might be expected from a paedomorphic individual of the family (which could have a longer pygidium with more segments).

== Paleoecology ==
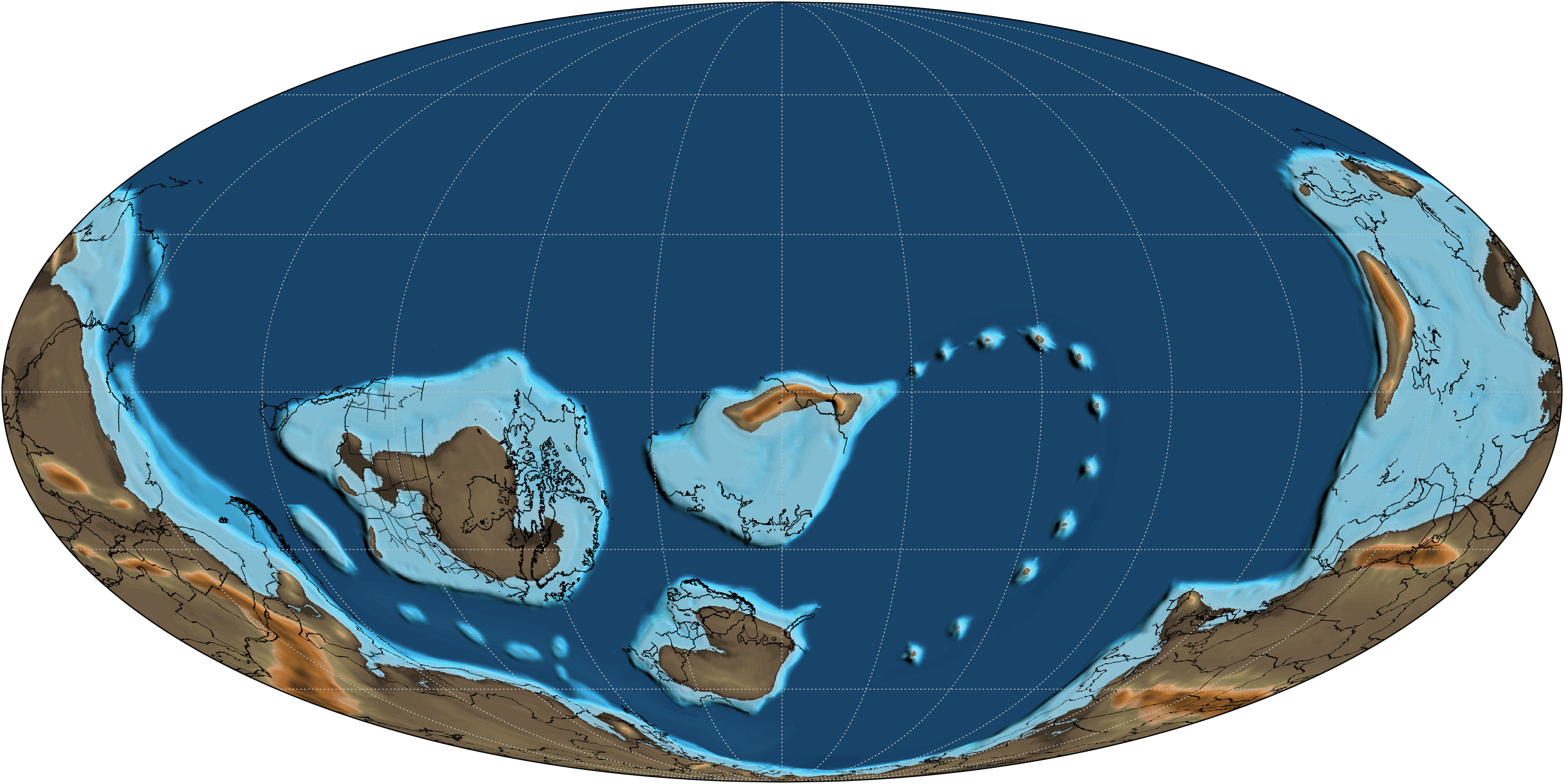
Map of the world during the Furongian, with the modern-day United States and Canada, where Aciculolenus lived, outlined

As of 2020, all known specimens of Aciculolenus come from the final zone of the Pterocephaliid biomere. This biomere originates from the Furongian epoch of the Cambrian from the ancient continent Laurentia. Based on Palmer's report of the occurrence of A. peculiaris at the top of the final zone, Chatterton estimated A. palmeri to be slightly older and A. askewi to be much younger. Palmer wrote that what is now the Great Basin was almost entirely covered by shallow seas during the Cambrian. The McKay Group, known for its well-preserved trilobite fossils, also contains the remains of brachiopods, graptolites, and a glass sponge. Most or all of the trilobites would have fed on detritus or other fine organic matter (possibly bacterial films). Unless some of the trilobites were predators, they would have had few sources of food besides sediment in this relatively calm and deep marine environment. While the non-trilobites found were all filter feeders, the small sizes and low numbers of the non-trilobites indicate that suspended food particles were likely limited. The sediment was likely deep enough to remain below wave base during fair and possibly stormy weather.

Chatterton and Ludvigsen reported that dense aggregations of Aciculolenus with the other trilobite genera Labiostria and Wujiajiania were common, but aggregations of mainly Aciculolenus were less so. Chatterton wrote that Aciculolenus was "almost certainly" benthic (living at the bottom of its aquatic habitat) or nektobenthic (living near the bottom) for most or all of its life cycle. He also wrote that it was possible that it had a symbiotic relationship with chemoautotrophs in its environment (namely bacteria on and in its substrate), as British paleontologist Richard Fortey had earlier proposed for some olenid trilobites.

== See also ==
- List of trilobite genera
