= Limniphacos =

Limniphacos Temporal range: Late Atdabanian, 524–522 Ma

Scientific classification
- Kingdom: Animalia
- Phylum: Arthropoda
- Clade: †Artiopoda
- Class: †Trilobita
- Order: †Redlichiida
- Family: †Nevadiidae
- Genus: †Limniphacos; Blaker & Peel, 1997
- Species: †L. perspicullum

Binomial name
- †Limniphacos perspicullum Blaker & Peel, 1997

Genus of trilobites (fossil)

Limniphacos is a genus of trilobites, a well known group of marine arthropods. The genus so far contains one species, L. perspicullum.

== Etymology ==
Limniphacos is derived from the Greek words limne (lake) and phakos (lens of the eye).

== Distribution ==
Earliest portion of the upper part of the Buen Formation, Brillesø, North of the Jørgen Brønlund Fjord, Southern Peary Land, Greenland.

== Ecology ==
Limniphacos perspiculum occurs together with Mesolenellus hyperborea, Serrodiscus, hyoliths, Petrianna fulmenta (Bradoriida), and inarticulate brachiopods.

== Description ==
The raised central part of the head shield (or glabella) is conical (with a narrow front and a wide back), and has four or five pairs of furrows. It does not reach the border furrow with its front. The eye lobes are short and do not reach the most backward glabellar lobe. The headshield (or cephalon) carries four spines. Those closest to the axis (or intergenal spines) are short. The outer spines (or genal spines) are of moderate length and slightly in front of the back of the cehalon. The main body (or thorax) has at least 12 segments with prominent spines. All parts are reticulate and granularly ornamented.

== Habitat ==
Limniphacos species were probably marine bottom dwellers, like all Olenellina.
