= Westergaardites =

Westergaardites Temporal range: Upper Cambrian

Scientific classification
- Kingdom: Animalia
- Phylum: Arthropoda
- Clade: †Artiopoda
- Class: †Trilobita
- Order: †Ptychopariida
- Family: †Olenidae
- Genus: †Westergaardites; Throedson, 1937

Type species
- Westergaardites pelturaeformis Throedson, 1937

Genus of trilobites

Westergaardites is an Upper Cambrian trilobite that is known from the Eastern Tian Shan (Central Asia). It is related to Triarthrus, but can easily be distinguished from it by an extremely long exoskeleton, anteriorly placed eyes, a thorax of 19 segments with an extremely wide axis, and very narrow pleural regions, pleural spines, and a pygidium with marginal spines.
