= Peltura =

Peltura Temporal range: Upper Cambrian

Scientific classification
- Kingdom: Animalia
- Phylum: Arthropoda
- Clade: †Artiopoda
- Class: †Trilobita
- Order: †Ptychopariida
- Family: †Olenidae
- Genus: †Peltura; Milne-Edwards, 1840

Type species
- †Entomostracites scarabaeoides Wahlenberg, 1818

Species
- †Peltura acutidens; †Peltura minor; †Peltura paradoxa; †Peltura scarabaeoides

Extinct genus of trilobites

Peltura is a genus of trilobites from the Upper Cambrian. The type specimen of Peltura scarabaeoides, the type species of the genus, was discovered in the Alum Shale Formation of Sweden and first described by the Swedish naturalist Göran Wahlenberg in 1818. Species of this genus have now been found throughout the Scandinavian and Baltic regions.
