= Olenidae =

Scientific classification
- Kingdom: Animalia
- Phylum: Arthropoda
- Clade: †Artiopoda
- Class: †Trilobita
- Order: †Ptychopariida
- Suborder: †Olenina
- Superfamily: †Olenoidea
- Family: †Olenidae; Burmeister, 1843

Genera
- See text

Family of trilobites

Olenidae is a family of ptychopariid trilobites. Some genera, Balnibarbi and Cloacaspis, are thought to have evolved a symbiotic relationship with sulfur-eating bacteria from which they derived nutrition.

== Genera ==
- Acerocare
- Acerocarina
- Aciculolenus
- Anaximander
- Angelina (=Keidelaspis),
- Apoplanias
- Asilluchus
- Baikonuraspis
- Balnibarbi
- Bienvillia (=Diatemnus; =Mendoparabolina)
- Boeckaspis (/Boeckia BROGGER; =Sphaerophthalmella)
- Bondarevites
- Bulbolenus
- Chekiangaspis
- Cloacaspis
- Ctenopyge
- Cyclognathina
- Danarcus
- Desmetia
- Eoctenopyge
- Euonchonotina
- Eurycare
- Granitzia
- Hancrania
- Helieranella
- Highgatella
- Huangshiaspis
- Hunanolenus
- Hypermecaspis (=Spitsbergaspis),
- Inkouia (=Agalatus),
- Isidrella
- Jujuyaspis (=Alimbetaspis),
- Leiobienvillia
- Leptoplastides (=Andesaspis;=Beltella; =Chunkingaspis; =Parabolinopsis; *Rampartaspis),
- Leptoplastus
- Leurostega
- Magnomma
- Mesoctenopyge
- Moxomia
- Neoolenus
- Neoparabolina
- Nericiaspis
- Olenus (=Simulolenus),
- Orkekeia
- Parabolina (/*Odontopyge),
- Parabolinella
- Parabolinina
- Parabolinites
- Paraolenus
- Paraplicatolina
- Peltocare
- Peltura (/Anthes; =Anopocare),
- Pelturina
- Plicatolina
- Plicatolinella
- Porterfieldia
- Prohedinella
- Protopeltura
- Psilocara
- Remizites
- Rhodonaspis
- Saltaspis
- Shihuigouia
- Sphaerophthalmus
- Svalbardites
- Talbotinella
- Triarthrus (/*Brongniartia EATON)?
- Ullaspis
- Westergaardia (=Sphaerophthalmoides)
- Westergaardites
- Wujiajiania.
