= Buen Formation =

Cambrian Lagerstätte in northern Greenland

- Stratigraphic range: Cambrian Series 2 (Atdabanian); ~520–513 Ma
- Type: Formation
- Unit of: Sirius Passet
- Sub-units: Upper & lower members
- Underlies: Hans Tavsen icecap
- Overlies: Portfjeld Formation
- Thickness: Up to 700 m (2,300 ft)

Lithology
- Primary: Mudstone
- Other: Sandstone, shale

Location
- Coordinates: 83.1°N 33.8°W
- Approximate paleocoordinates: 22.1°S 49.0°W
- Region: Peary Land
- Country: Greenland
- Extent: Franklinian Basin

Type section
- Location: Southern Peary Land
- Buen Formation (Greenland)

The Buen Formation is a geologic formation and Lagerstätte in Peary Land, North Greenland. The shale preserves fossils dated to the early Cambrian period (Atdabanian in the local timescale, about 520 to 513 Ma).

== Description ==
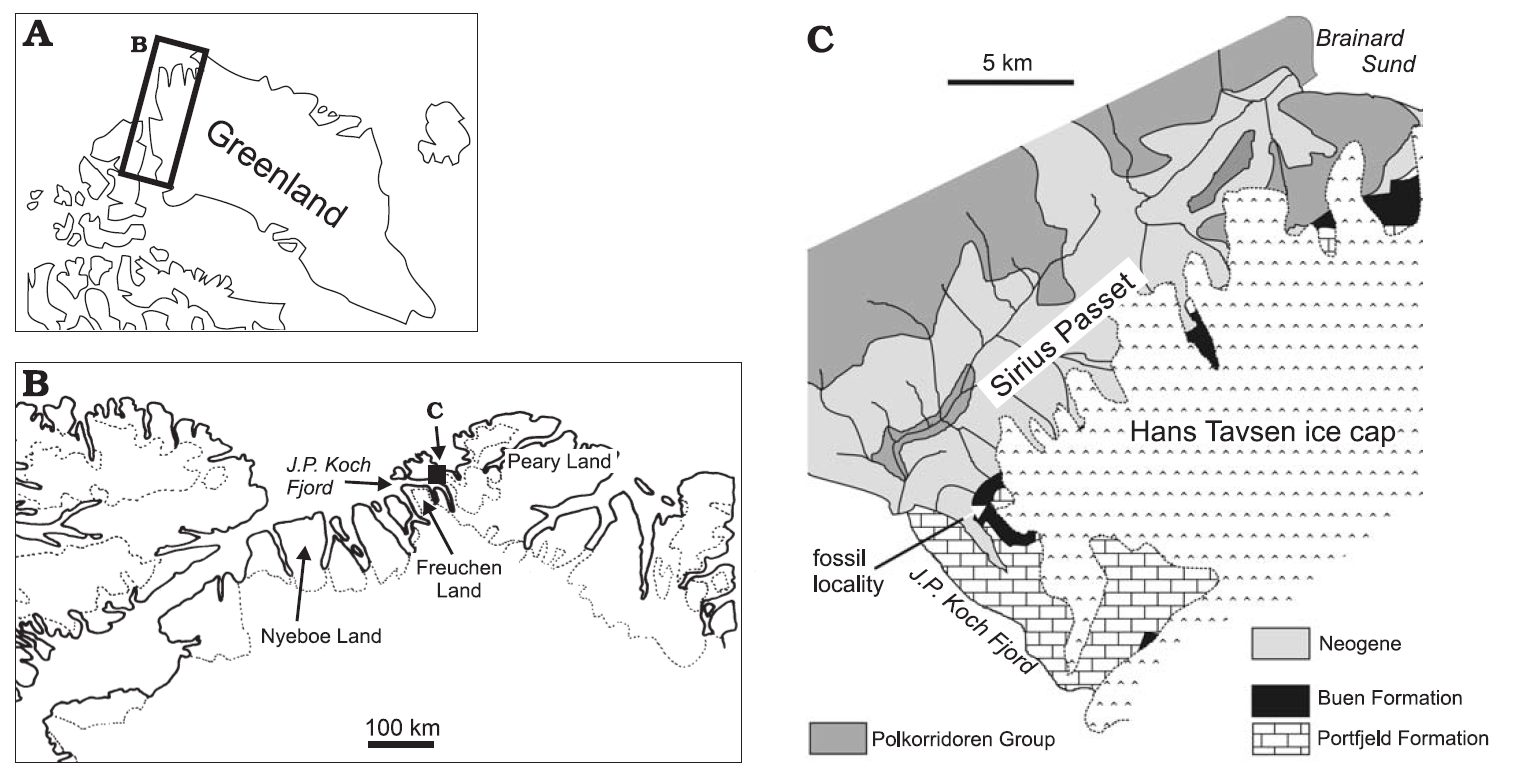
Geologic map of Sirius Passet with the Buen Formation shown in black

The oldest Cambrian series of the area was deposited in the Franklinian Basin and is poorly exposed in fragmentary, heavily metamorphosed outcrops in Peary Land. It was emplaced during the Ellesmerian orogeny.

=== Paleogeography ===
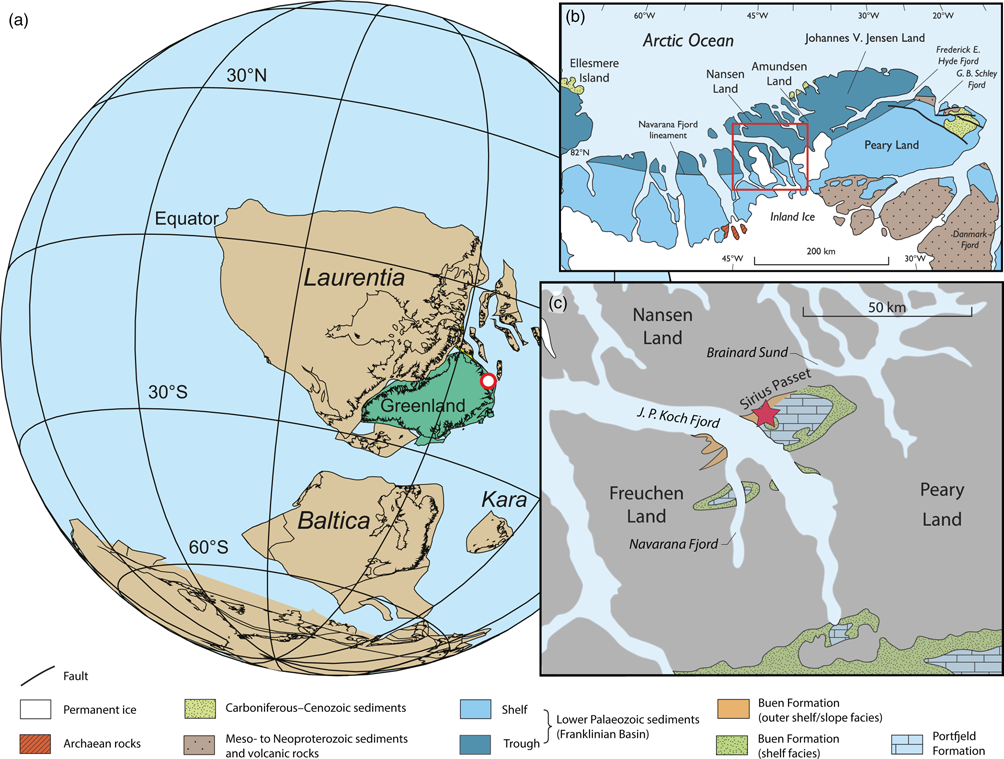
Cambrian paleogeography with the Buen Formation in orange

During the Cambrian, Greenland was located in the southern tropical to temperate region. The Buen Formation forms part of the southern shelf succession of the Franklinian Basin of North Greenland and the Canadian Arctic Islands. The formation, approximately 325 metres (1,066 ft) thick, consists of a lower, sand−dominated, member overlain by an upper member dominated by dark grey−green mudstones and siltstones in its type area in southern Peary Land. It thickens to around 700 metres (2,300 ft) in northern Peary Land where it comprises a mud−rich transitional succession into deep water trough deposits of the Polkorridoren Group. Dark grey to black mudstones form part of this transitional succession from the shelf to the slope. To the south they lie in faulted contact with pale dolomites of the underlying Portfjeld Formation, and to the north with bioturbated mudstones and sandstones of the Buen Formation.

== Fossil content ==
The following fossils have been reported from the formation:

Fossils from the Buen Formation, Sirius Passet, Greenland
Group	Taxon	Image	Notes
Annelids	Phragmochaeta canicularis		
Arthropods	Buenaspis forteyi		
Arthropods	Buenellus		
Arthropods	Aaveqaspis		
Arthropods	Kerygmachela		
Arthropods	Tamisiocaris		
Arthropods	Limniphacos		
Arthropods	Waptia		
Arthropods	Kleptothule rasmusseni		
Arthropods	Isoxys volucris		
Arthropods	Hadranax augustus		
Arthropods	Pauloterminus spinodorsalis		
Molluscs	Halkieria evangelista		
Demosponges	Choia hindei		
Others	Heliosphaeridium dissimilare		
Others	Trapezovitus malinkyi		
Others	Kalaallitia myliuserichseni		
Others	Nasaaraqia hyptiotheciformis		
Others	Nevadotheca boerglumensis		
Others	Sullulika broenlundi		
Others	Alutella siku		

== See also ==
- List of fossiliferous stratigraphic units in Greenland
- Sirius Passet
