= Svalbardites =

Svalbardites Temporal range: Arenig

Scientific classification
- Kingdom: Animalia
- Phylum: Arthropoda
- Clade: †Artiopoda
- Class: †Trilobita
- Order: †Ptychopariida
- Family: †Olenidae
- Genus: †Svalbardites; Fortey, 1974

Extinct genus of trilobites

Svalbardites is an extinct genus of trilobites. It lived during the Arenig stage of the Ordovician Period, approximately 478 to 471 million years ago.
