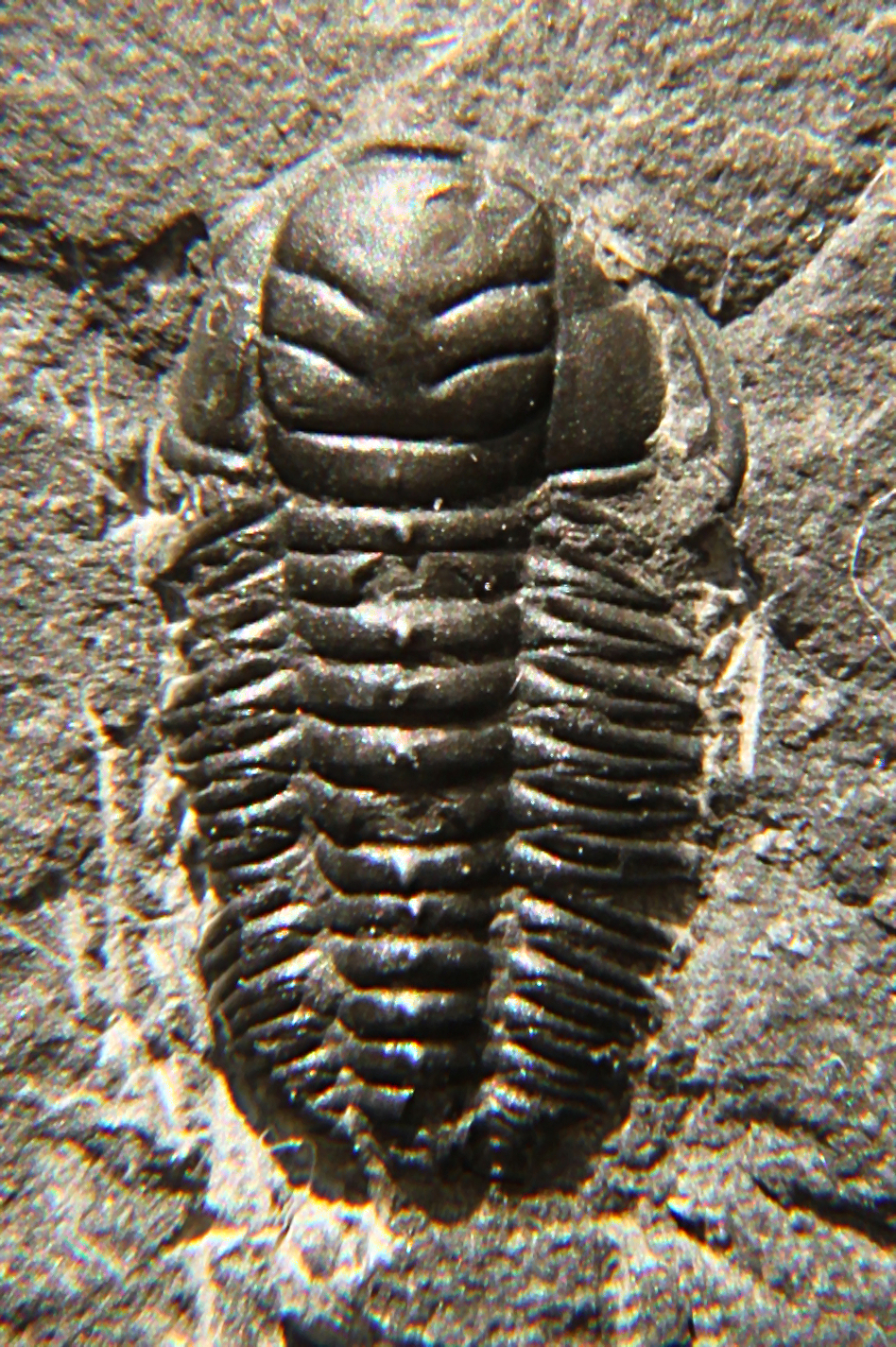
- Triarthrus eatoni

Scientific classification
- Kingdom: Animalia
- Phylum: Arthropoda
- Clade: †Artiopoda
- Class: †Trilobita
- Order: †Ptychopariida
- Suborder: †Olenina

Families
- See text

= Olenina =

Olenina Temporal range: Cambrian Stage 3–Late Ordovician

Extinct suborder of trilobites

Olenina is an extinct suborder of the trilobite order Ptychopariida. A number of recent authors have suggested that Olenidae and related families should be placed in their own order, Olenida.

== Subdivisions ==
- Superfamily Olenoidea
  - Family Ellipsocephaloididae
  - Family Olenidae
- Superfamily Incertae sedis
  - Genus Triarthrus

As Olenida:

- Olenidae
- Aphelaspididae
- Parabolinoididae
- Pterocephaliididae
