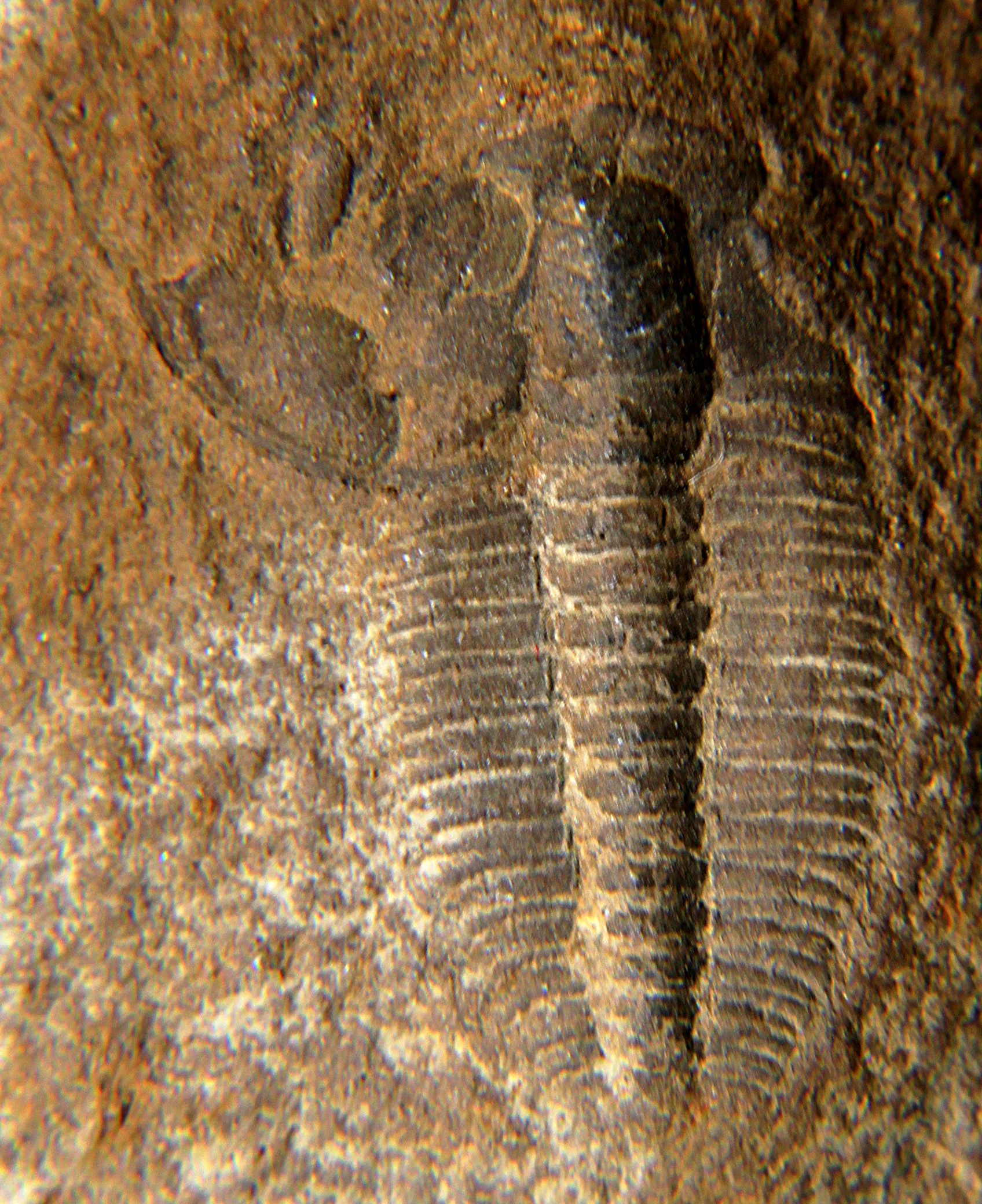
- Olenus micrurus from Trawsfynydd, N Wales, right free cheek displaced to left and turned 150°, pygidium missing

Scientific classification
- Kingdom: Animalia
- Phylum: Arthropoda
- Clade: †Artiopoda
- Class: †Trilobita
- Order: †Ptychopariida
- Family: †Olenidae
- Genus: †Olenus; Dalman, 1827 non Dejean, 1835 nomen nudum, ex Thomson, 1857 (= Trycherus, a beetle)

Species
- O. alpha Henningsmoen, 1957; O. altaicus Ivshin, 1962; O. apoxysomatus Jell et al., 1991; O. asiaticus Kobayashi, 1944; O. attenuatus (Boeck, 1838); O. austriacus Yang in Zhou et al., 1977; O. cataractes Salter, 1864; O. delicatus Öpik, 1963; O. dentatus Westergård, 1922; O. gibbosus (Wahlenberg, 1821) (type); O. guizhouensis Lu and Chien in Yin and Li, 1978; O. haimantensis Reed, 1910; O. henningsmoeni Ahlgren and Ahlberg, 1996; O. micrurus Salter, 1849; O. mundus Lake, 1908; O. ogilviei Öpik, 1963; O. proximus Lazarenko, 1966; O. rotundatus Westergård, 1922; O. scanicus Westergård, 1922; O. sinensis Lu, 1964; O. solitarius (Westergård, 1922); O. transverses Westergård, 1922; O. truncatus (Brünnich, 1781); O. veles Rushton, 1983; O. wahlenbergi Westergård, 1922

= Olenus (trilobite) =

Olenus Temporal range: 498.5–488.3 Ma Upper Cambrian

Extinct genus of trilobites

Olenus is a genus of Upper Cambrian ptychopariid trilobite.

== Distribution ==
Olenus can be found in the British Isles, India, Norway, Sweden, Denmark, Newfoundland, Texas, South Korea, and Australia.

- O. haimantensis occurs in the Middle Cambrian of India (upper part of the Parahio Formation, left bank of the Parahio/Barachu river, above the Moopa camping ground, Spiti).

== Ecology ==
Fossils of Olenus are commonly found in dark mudstones, which were deposited on the seafloor in environments with low oxygen levels. The very wide side lobes (or pleurae) are thought to have shielded extended gills, which would have helped the animal absorb the maximum amount of oxygen possible in such an environment. Evidence also suggests that Olenus and its relatives may have developed a symbiotic relationship with sulfate-reducing bacteria, either by feeding on them or by absorbing nutrients directly from them.

== Taxonomy ==
=== Species previously assigned to Olenus ===
- O. forficula = Ceratopyge forficula
- O. pecten = Ctenopyge pecten
- O. punctatus = Asteropyge punctata
- O. thompsoni = Olenellus thompsoni
- O. zoppii = Dolerolenus zoppii

== Description ==
Size: Up to 1.5 in (4 cm) long. It had up to 15 thoracic segments, with a narrow axis and wide pleurae.
