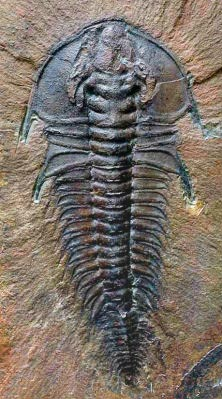
- Mesonacis vermontanus, late Lower Cambrian, Australia, Courtesy of Sam Gon III.

Scientific classification
- Kingdom: Animalia
- Phylum: Arthropoda
- Clade: †Artiopoda
- Class: †Trilobita
- Order: †Redlichiida
- Family: †Olenellidae
- Subfamily: †Mesonacinae; Walcott, 1890

Genera
- Mesonacis Walcott, 1885; Mesolenellus (Palmer & Repina, 1993)

= Mesonacinae =

Mesonacinae Temporal range: 516–513 Ma Botomian

Extinct subfamily of trilobites

The Mesonacinae comprise an extinct subfamily of trilobites that lived during the Botomian, found in North-America, Greenland and North-Western Scotland. The two genera in this subfamily are Mesonacis and Mesolenellus.
