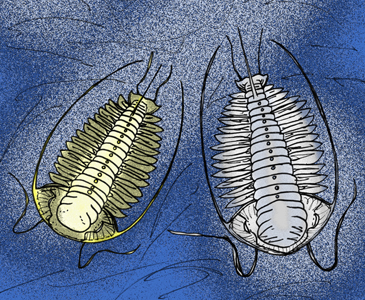
- Cloacaspis senilis, and C. ekphymosa

Scientific classification
- Kingdom: Animalia
- Phylum: Arthropoda
- Clade: †Artiopoda
- Class: †Trilobita
- Order: †Ptychopariida
- Family: †Olenidae
- Genus: †Cloacaspis; Fortey 1974

= Cloacaspis =

Cloacaspis Temporal range: Early Arenig

Extinct genus of trilobites

Cloacaspis is an extinct genus of olenid ptychopariid trilobite. It lived during the early part of the Arenig stage of the Ordovician Period, a faunal stage which lasted from approximately 478 to 471 million years ago. Richard Fortey has proposed that these particular trilobites lived in anoxic regions of the ocean floor, and cultivated symbiotic, sulfur-metabolizing bacteria.

== Etymology ==
The generic name is a compound word from Latin, "cloaca," meaning sewer, and from Greek, "aspis," meaning "shield." Thus, Cloacaspis translate as "sewer shield." In his book, Trilobite! Eyewitness to Evolution, Fortey, who first discovered the genus in Ordovician strata in Spitsbergen, explained that the rocks they were found in had a rank, sulfurous odor, reminding him of raw sewage.
