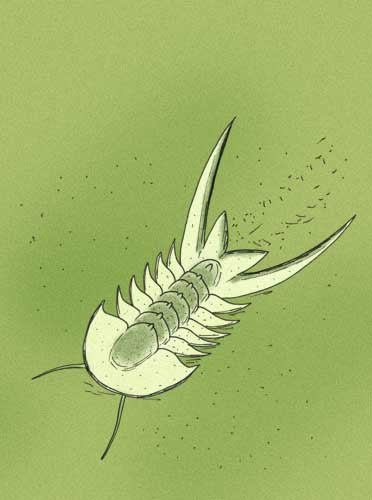
- Life restoration

Scientific classification
- Kingdom: Animalia
- Phylum: Arthropoda
- Class: incertae sedis
- Genus: †Aaveqaspis; Peel & Stein, 2009
- Species: †A. inesoni

Binomial name
- †Aaveqaspis inesoni Peel & Stein 2009

= Aaveqaspis =

Aaveqaspis Temporal range: Cambrian Stage 3

Extinct marine arthropod

Aaveqaspis is a genus of small (about 2.5 centimetres or 1.0 inch long) marine arthropods of unclear affiliation, that lived during the early Cambrian period. Fossil remains of Aaveqaspis were collected from the Lower Cambrian Sirius Passet fossil-Lagerstätte of North Greenland. Aaveqaspis looks like a soft eyeless trilobite with a weakly defined axis, a headshield (or cephalon) with stubby genal spines, 5 thorax segments also ending in stubby genal spines, and a tailshield (pygidium) with a pair of massive tusk-like spines, and two smaller spines near the end of the axis. The only species presently known is A. inesoni (i.e. the genus is monotypic).

== Etymology ==
The name of the genus is a compound of the Greenlandic word aaveq ('walrus'), reflecting the likeness of the tail spines to the tusks of a walrus, and the Ancient Greek word ἀσπίς (aspís; 'shield'). The species was named after Jon R. Ineson to honour him for his studies of the Cambrian of North Greenland.

== Description ==
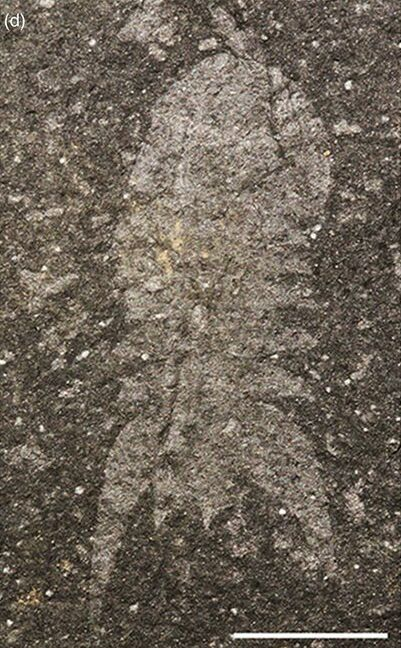
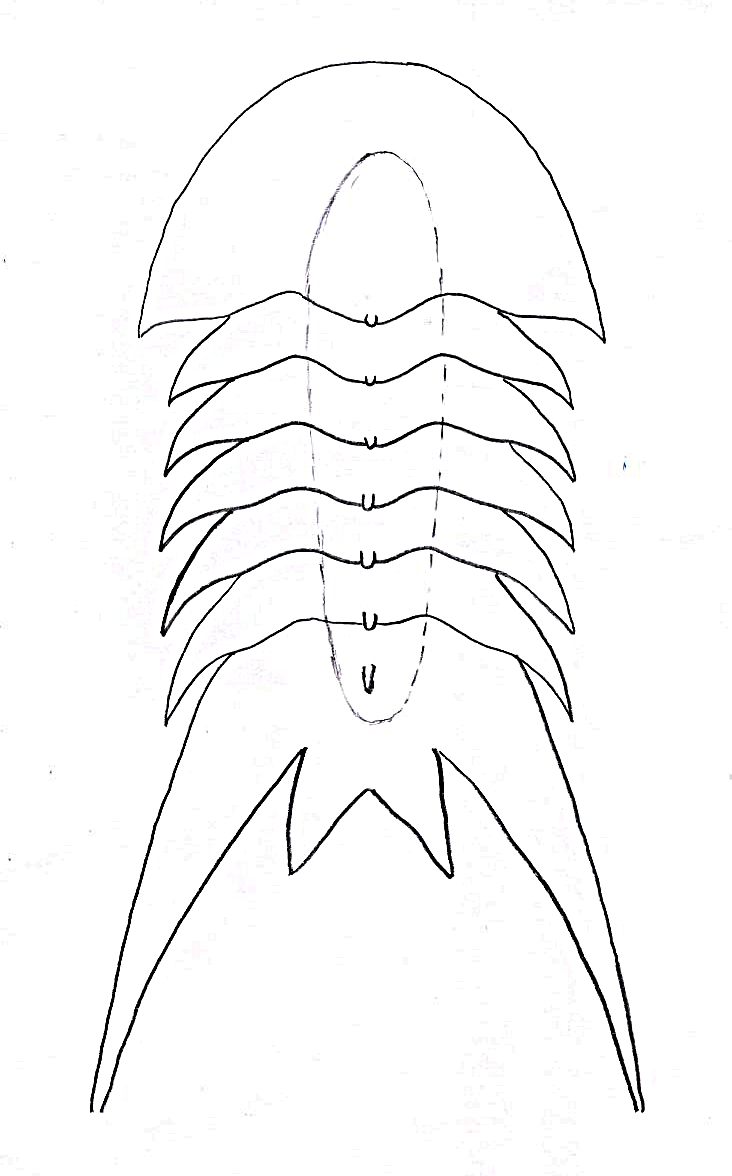
Fossil and drawing of the carapace

Aaveqaspis inesoni is almost flat (dorso-ventrally). Its body is narrowly oval in general outline, disregarding the two large spines. The upper non-calcified (or dorsal) side of the body consists of a cephalon, 5 thorax segments, and a pygidium. The axis is slightly raised, but without a discernible furrow defining its outline. The axis is about 20% of the width of the cephalon. The cephalon is half-round, and almost twice as wide as long (along the axis). The (posterolateral) corners of the cephalon are acute, ending in short stout spines. The back margin of the cephalon from the spine to the midline has in the pleural region a forward angle and is first concave, then convex, then concave again, attaining a backward angle when reaching the axis, and finally convex, with a small node or median spine reaching the back margin. This pattern is repeated with all thorax segments. Antennae are not known. Dorsal eyes are absent. The thorax segments are each about 1.5 millimetres (0.06 in) along the axis. The tail shield is dominated by a pair of large segmental marginal spines, reminiscent of large (or macropleural) spines in the thorax and of pygidial spines of certain trilobites. The one node it carries is larger and more sharply defined than the nodes on the segments. The frontal border of the tail shield is convex and curves laterally into the large spines which extend postero-laterally, constituting half the total body length. The back margin of the spines is concave and merges into the second pair of short, broad, triangular spines. Body parts on the belly (or ventral) side are not known, including any appendages.

== Distribution ==
A. inesoni has been collected from the Lower Cambrian (Atdabanian) Buen Formation, Sirius Passet fossil-Lagerstätte, Peary Land, North Greenland, 82°47′6″N 106°12′7″E, on the south side of the broad valley known as Sirius Passet at its junction with J. P. Koch Fjord.

== Habitat ==
Aaveqaspis inesoni was probably a marine bottom dweller, that lived in deeper water. This may be deduced from the dominance of eyeless forms and the absence of seaweeds at the collection site.

== Taxonomic position ==
The taxonomic position of A. inesoni is unclear.
