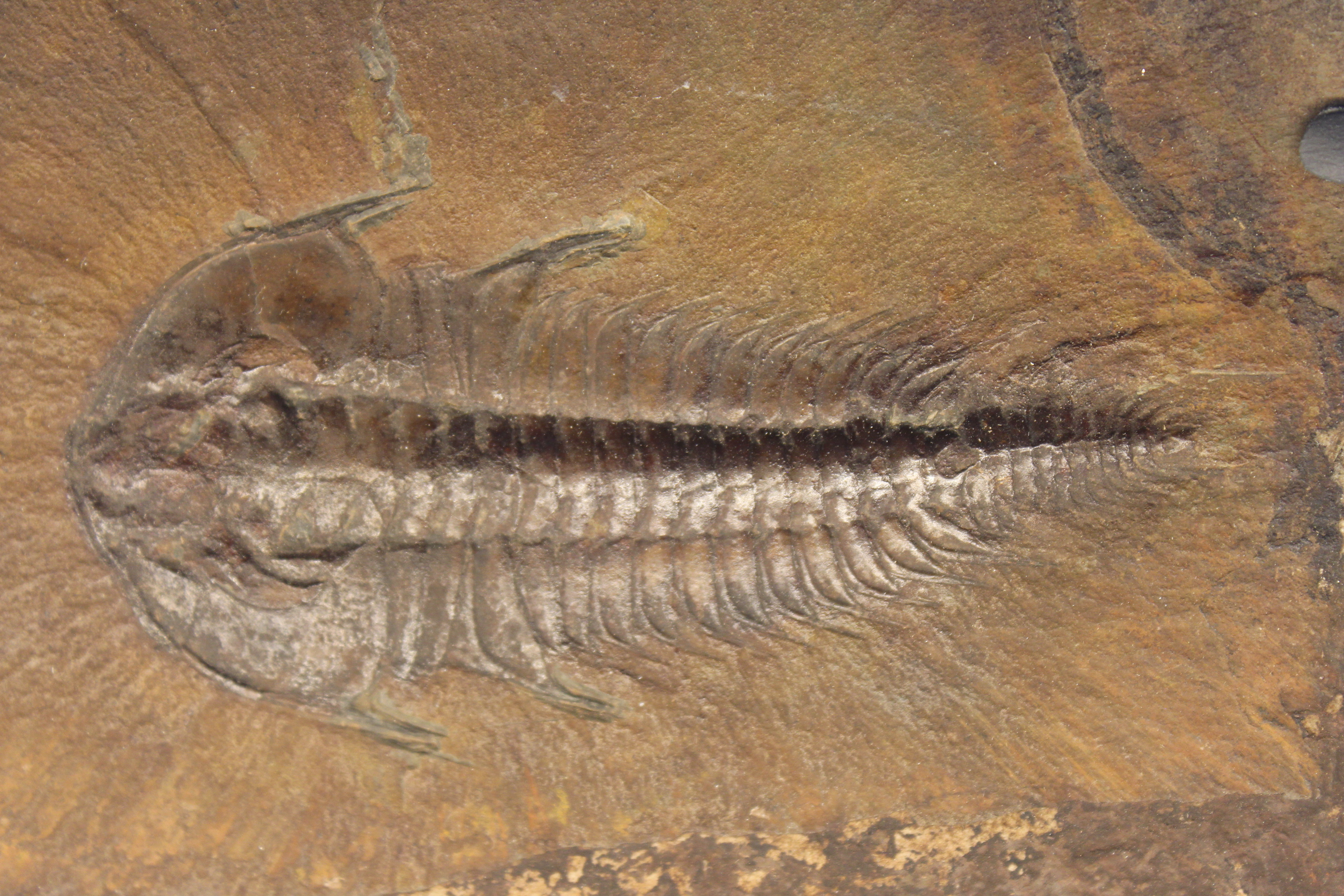
- Mesonacis vermontanus, late lower Cambrian, Vermont, USA, courtesy of the Smithsonian Museum of Natural History.

Scientific classification
- Domain: Eukaryota
- Kingdom: Animalia
- Phylum: Arthropoda
- Class: †Trilobita
- Order: †Redlichiida
- Family: †Olenellidae
- Subfamily: †Mesonacinae
- Genus: †Mesonacis; Walcott, 1885

Species
- Mesonacis vermontanus (Hall, 1859) type species, synonyms Olenellus vermontanus, O. georgiensis; Mesonacis bonnensis (Resser and Howell, 1938), synonyms Olenellus bonnensis, O. brevioculus, O. terranovicus; Mesonacis cylindricus (Palmer, 1979), synonyms Olenellus cylindricus; Mesonacis eagerensis (Best, 1952), synonym Olenellus eagerensis; Mesonacis fremonti (Walcott, 1910), synonyms Olenellus fremonti, Fremontia fremonti; Mesonacis hamoculus (Cowie & McNamara, 1978), synonym Olenellus hamoculus

= Mesonacis =

Mesonacis Temporal range: 516–513 Ma Botomian

Extinct genus of trilobites

Mesonacis is an extinct genus of trilobite that lived during the Botomian, found in North-America (excluding Greenland), and the United Kingdom (North-Western Scotland). Some of the species now regarded part of Mesonacis, have previously been assigned to Angustolenellus or Olenellus (Angustolenellus). Angustolenellus is now regarded a junior synonym of Mesonacis.

== Etymology ==
Mesonacis vermontanus is named after the State of Vermont, where it was collected. Mesonacis bonnensis is called after the Bonne Bay, Newfoundland, where the species is found. Mesonacis eagerensis refers to the Eager Formation, British Columbia, in which it occurs. Mesonacis hamoculus is derived from the Latin hamus, meaning hooked, and oculus, meaning eye.

== Distribution ==
Mesonacis vermontanus occurs in the middle Upper Olenellus-zone of Vermont (Parker Slate, Georgia).

Mesonacis bonnensis has been found in the Olenellus-zone of Newfoundland, Canada (Forteau Formation, East shore of the Bonne Bay East Arm).

Mesonacis cylindricus was collected in the Upper Olenellus-zone of California (Eagle Mountain Shale, Carrara Formation, Grapeville Mountains, White/Inyo Mountains, South end of the Marble Mountains, and in San Bernardino County).

Mesonacis eagerensis is present in the Olenellus-zone of British Columbia, Canada (Eager Formation, just South of the Fort Steel-St. Eugene Mission road, 6 miles North-East of Cranbrook).

Mesonacis fremonti was excavated in California from the Olenellus-zone (Pyramid Shale Member, Carrara Formation, Funeral Mountains, Resting Spring Range, and Salt Spring Hills), the Lower Olenellus-zone (Upper Poleta and lower Harkless Formations) and the Upper Olenellus-zone (middle part of the Latham Shale, at the Southern end of the Marble Mountains; Latham Shale, Marble Mountains, ½ mile East of Cadiz; the Mohave Desert portion of San Bernardino County; the Mule Spring Limestone, White/Inyo Mountains region), and in Nevada (arenaceous shales at the summit of Prospect Mountain, Eureka County).

Mesonacis hamoculus occurs in the Olenellus-zone of Scotland (Loch Awe).

== Description ==
As with most early trilobites, Mesonacis has an almost flat exoskeleton that is only thinly calcified, and has crescent-shaped eye ridges with a total length up to 2.8 inches in some fossils from the Early Cambrian. As part of the suborder Olenellina, Mesonacis lacks dorsal sutures. Like all other members of the superfamily Olenelloidea, the eye-ridges spring from the back of the frontal lobe (L4) of the central area of the cephalon, that is called glabella. Mesonacis also shares the typical character of whole family Olenellidae in that the frontal (L3) and middle pair (L2) of lateral lobes of the glabella are partially merged. This creates two very typical, isolated slits. The exoskeleton of Mesonacis is about 2⅓× as long as wide, measured between the genal angles. The outer ⅓ of the back (or posterior margin) of the headshield (or cephalon) angles forwards from the tip of the pleural spine to the genal angle. The central area of the cephalon (or glabella) and the frontal margin touch or the distance is as long as the margin at most. The thorax has approximately 25 segments, the pleura about 1½× as wide as the axis, excluding the genal spines. The 3rd segment carries extra large pleural spines (or macropleural spines) that reach back only to the tip of the 5th pleural spines. The segments look degenerated behind the 15th (or an opisthothorax can be distinguished). The tailshield (or pygidium) is very small and subquadrate in shape, and carries one or two pairs of small marginal spines.

== Key to the species ==
1	The curved eye-ridges are at an angle of 15°-20° with the midline. Except for the third thorax segment, the spine on the side lobes (or pleural spine) is approximately a quarter of the length of the segment, halfway between the spine and the axis. → 2
-	The curved eye-ridges are at an angle of 0°-5° with the midline. The pleural spines of T1-T2 and T4-T14 are at least half as long as the segment. → Mesonacis fremonti
2	The furrows between the lobes of the glabella are faintly incised. The frontal lobe of the glabella (L4) is connected with the border surrounding the cephalon with a short ridge on the midline (the so-called “plectrum”). → Mesonacis bonnensis
-	The furrows between the lobes of the glabella are prominently incised. A plectrum is absent or very faint. → 3
3	The frontal lobe (L4) of the glabella intersects the anterior border furrow. The furrow between the second (L2) and third (L3) side lobes (S2) is transverse. The furrow between the occipital ring (or posterior lobe, L0) and the first pair of side lobes (L1), indicated as S0, is joint at midline. → 4
-	L4 does not intersect the anterior border furrow. S2 curves, so that it is further to the back at midline. S0 consist of two furrows that do not joint at midline. → 5
4	S2 contacts the furrow that defines the glabella (or axial furrow). The posterior rim of the cephalon (or intergenal angle) curves forwards midway between the posterior tip of the eye ridge and the genal angle. Frontal glabellar lobe (L4) as wide as the occipital ring (L0). → Mesonacis hamoculus
-	S2 does not contact the axial furrow. The intergenal angle is located at three quarters the tip of the eye lobe and the genal angle. L4 wider than L0. → Mesonacis cylindricus
5	The frontal margin of the macropleural segment (T3) flexes forwards at at least 110° with the midline. The second (L2) and third (L3) pair of glabellar side lobes are not divided by a furrow at midline (or S2 does not join at midline). → Mesonacis vermontanus
-	The frontal margin of T3 flexes forwards no more than 95°. S2 is joined at midline. → Mesonacis eagerensis

== Sources ==
- "Photo of M. vermontanus". Trilobite info. Archived from the original on August 20, 2023.
