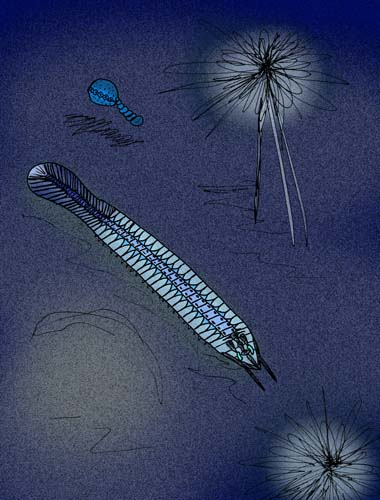
- Kleptothule rasmusseni and Ooedigera

Scientific classification
- Kingdom: Animalia
- Phylum: Arthropoda
- Class: Trilobita
- Order: Redlichiida
- Suborder: ?Olenellina
- Superfamily: ?Fallotaspidoidea
- Family: ?Nevadiidae
- Genus: Kleptothule
- Species: K. rasmusseni

Binomial name
- Kleptothule rasmusseni (Budd, 1995)

= Kleptothule =

Kleptothule Temporal range: Atdabanian

Genus of trilobite

Kleptothule rasmusseni is a small, elongated trilobite, about 3 cm in length, and about 5 to 6 mm in width, from the Sirius Passet Lagerstätte. It is currently placed in the family Nevadiidae, though this may change with further study.

Its cephalon is composed of at least five segments, and its elongated thorax is composed of 27+ segments. The 20 or so segments of the pygidium are poorly defined, as they are fused together.
