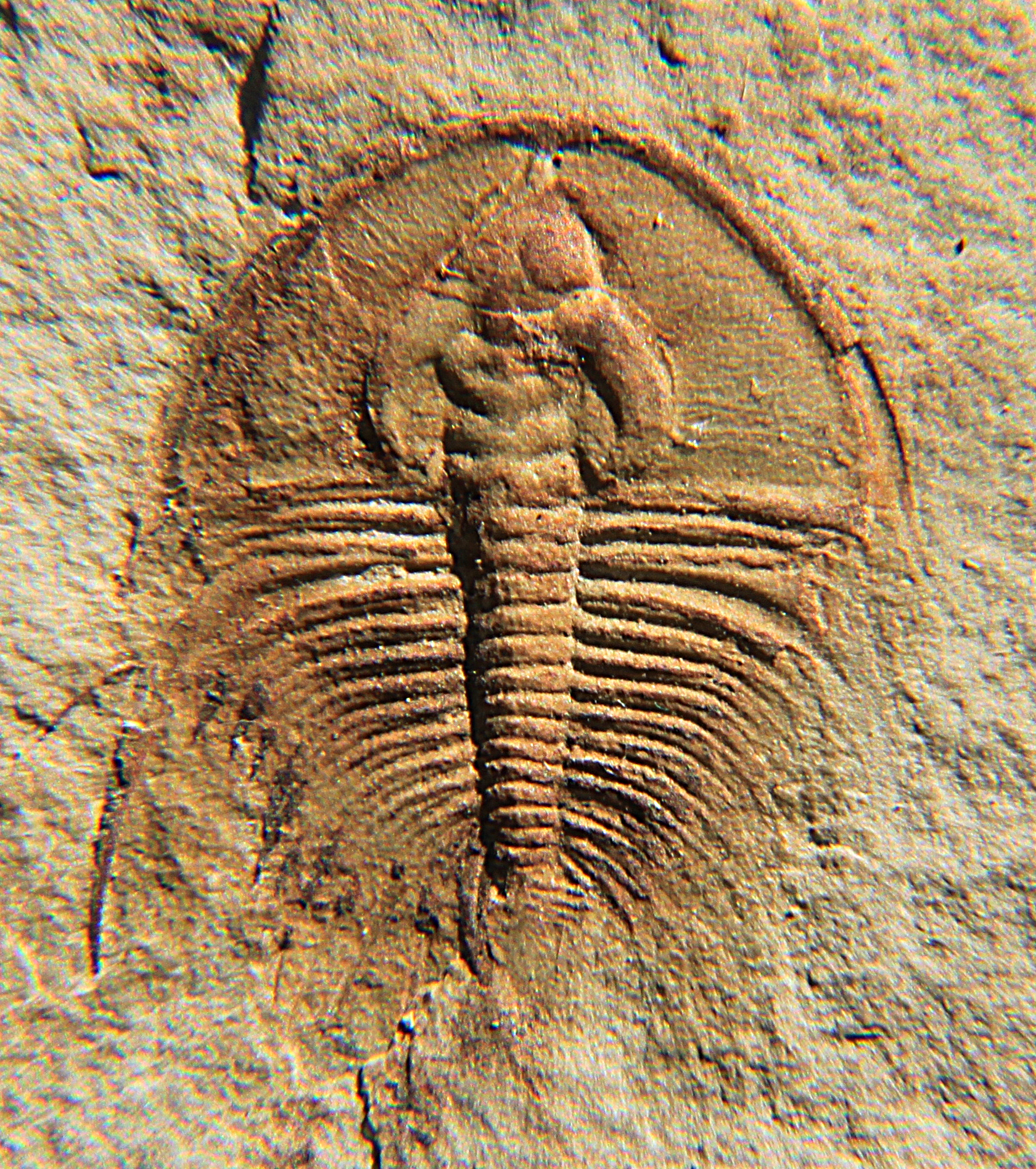
- Olenellus fowleri

Scientific classification
- Kingdom: Animalia
- Phylum: Arthropoda
- Clade: †Artiopoda
- Class: †Trilobita
- Order: †Redlichiida
- Suborder: †Olenellina
- Superfamily: †Olenelloidea
- Family: †Olenellidae; Walcott, 1890

Subfamilies
- Olenellinae; Mesonacinae

= Olenellidae =

Olenellidae Temporal range: Botomian/Toyonian (Olenellus-zone)

Extinct family of trilobites

Olenellidae is an extinct family of redlichiid trilobite arthropods. Olenellids lived during the late Lower Cambrian (Botomian/Toyonian) in the Olenellus-zone in the former paleocontinent of Laurentia and parts of what became the Famatinian orogen in what is now Argentina. This family can be distinguished from most other Olenellina by the partial merger of the frontal (L3) and middle pair (L2) of lateral lobes of the central area of the cephalon, that is called glabella, creating two isolated slits.

== Key to the subfamilies ==
1	The angle in the back rim of the cephalon is less than 15°. Genal spines are reaching back no further than the 6th thorax segment. Spine on the 15th thorax segment almost as wide as the axis. → Olenellinae
-	The angle in the back rim of the cephalon is more than 25°. Genal spines are reaching back at least to the 8th thorax segment. spine on the 15th thorax segment less than half as wide as the axis. → Mesonacinae
